= National Register of Historic Places listings in Cherokee County, South Carolina =

Location of Cherokee County in South Carolina

This is a list of the National Register of Historic Places listings in Cherokee County, South Carolina.

This is intended to be a complete list of the properties and districts on the National Register of Historic Places in Cherokee County, South Carolina, United States. The locations of National Register properties and districts for which the latitude and longitude coordinates are included below, may be seen in a map.

There are 25 properties and districts listed on the National Register in the county. Another 4 properties and districts were once listed but have been removed.

This National Park Service list is complete through NPS recent listings posted September 12, 2025.

== Current listings ==
| | Name on the Register | Image | Date listed | Location | City or town | Description |
|---|---|---|---|---|---|---|
| 1 | Archeological Site 38CK1 | Archeological Site 38CK1 | December 10, 1980 (#80003661) | Address Restricted | Gaffney | |
| 2 | Archeological Site 38CK44 | | December 10, 1980 (#80003662) | Address Restricted | Gaffney | |
| 3 | Archeological Site 38CK45 | | December 10, 1980 (#80003663) | Address Restricted | Gaffney | |
| 4 | Carnegie Free Library | Carnegie Free Library | June 2, 2000 (#00000587) | 210 N. Limestone St. 35°04′25″N 81°38′54″W | Gaffney | |
| 5 | Coopersville Ironworks Site (38CK2) and Susan Furnace Site (38CK67) | | November 13, 1976 (#76001699) | Address Restricted | Gaffney | |
| 6 | Cowpens Furnace Site (38CK73) | Cowpens Furnace Site (38CK73) | May 8, 1987 (#87000704) | Address Restricted | Gaffney | |
| 7 | Cowpens National Battlefield | Cowpens National Battlefield | October 15, 1966 (#66000072) | 2 miles (3.2 km) east of Chesnee at the junction of South Carolina Highways 11 and 110; 35°08′02″N 81°48′40″W | Chesnee | |
| 8 | Winnie Davis Hall | Winnie Davis Hall | April 29, 1977 (#77001219) | 1115 College Dr. 35°03′23″N 81°39′00″W | Gaffney | |
| 9 | Ellen Furnace Site (38CK68) | | May 8, 1987 (#87000705) | Address Restricted | Gaffney | |
| 10 | Gaffney Commercial Historic District | Gaffney Commercial Historic District | March 27, 1986 (#86000602) | Roughly N. Limestone St. between Cherokee Ave. and E. Meadow St. 35°04′20″N 81°38′50″W | Gaffney | |
| 11 | Gaffney Residential Historic District | Gaffney Residential Historic District | March 27, 1986 (#86000601) | Roughly bounded by Floyd Baker Boulevard, Johnson and Thompson Sts., Rutledge and Fairview Aves., and Limestone St. 35°04′01″N 81°38′54″W | Gaffney | |
| 12 | Zeno Hicks House | Zeno Hicks House | February 9, 1989 (#89000002) | U.S. Route 221 and Mill Gap Rd. 35°09′07″N 81°51′21″W | Chesnee | |
| 13 | Irene Mill Finishing Plant | Irene Mill Finishing Plant | March 27, 1986 (#86000591) | Western side of Buford St. between Liberty and Logan Sts. 35°04′28″N 81°38′36″W | Gaffney | |
| 14 | Jefferies House | Jefferies House | March 27, 1986 (#86000594) | 306 S. Grannard St. 35°04′16″N 81°39′11″W | Gaffney | |
| 15 | King's Creek Furnace Site (38CK71) | | May 8, 1987 (#87000707) | Address Restricted | Kings Creek | |
| 16 | Kings Mountain National Military Park | Kings Mountain National Military Park | October 15, 1966 (#66000079) | Northwest of Bethany on South Carolina Highway 161; 35°08′16″N 81°23′22″W | Bethany | Extends into York County |
| 17 | Kings Mountain State Park Historic District | Kings Mountain State Park Historic District | March 14, 2008 (#08000185) | 1277 Park Rd. 35°07′50″N 81°20′44″W | Blacksburg | |
| 18 | Limestone Springs Historic District | Limestone Springs Historic District | March 27, 1986 (#86000597) | O'Neal St. extension and Limestone College campus 35°03′14″N 81°38′53″W | Gaffney | |
| 19 | Magness-Humphries House | Magness-Humphries House | October 20, 2001 (#01001159) | 101 Grassy Pond Rd. 35°08′08″N 81°40′26″W | Gaffney | |
| 20 | Mulberry Chapel Methodist Church | Mulberry Chapel Methodist Church | June 21, 2012 (#12000370) | 582 Asbury Rd. 34°55′48″N 81°39′15″W | Pacolet vicinity | |
| 21 | Nesbitt's Limestone Quarry (38CK69) | | May 8, 1987 (#87000710) | Address Restricted | Gaffney | |
| 22 | Nuckolls-Jefferies House | Nuckolls-Jefferies House | April 18, 2007 (#07000336) | 571 Asbury Rd. 34°55′56″N 81°39′40″W | Pacolet | |
| 23 | Settlemyer House | Settlemyer House | March 27, 1986 (#86000598) | 915 N. Limehouse St. 35°04′47″N 81°38′36″W | Gaffney | |
| 24 | Shiloh Presbyterian Church Cemetery | Shiloh Presbyterian Church Cemetery | December 22, 2011 (#11000954) | Elm St., 0.9 miles (1.4 km) south of U.S. Route 29; 35°10′09″N 81°25′57″W | Blacksburg | Extends into Cleveland County, North Carolina |
| 25 | Thicketty Mountain Ore Pits (38CK74) | | May 8, 1987 (#87000711) | Address Restricted | Shady Grove Church | |

== Former listings ==
| | Name on the Register | Image | Date listed | Date removed | Location | City or town | Description |
|---|---|---|---|---|---|---|---|
| 1 | Robbs House | | March 27, 1986 (#86000593) | March 15, 2000 | 310 W. Buford St. | Gaffney | Demolished on January 17, 1991. |
| 2 | Sarratt House | | March 27, 1986 (#86000599) | March 15, 2000 | 217 Marion St. | Gaffney | Demolished. |
| 3 | Victor Cotton Oil Company Complex | | March 27, 1986 (#86000596) | March 15, 2000 | West side of Frederick St. between Hill St. and Johnson St. | Gaffney | Demolished. |
| 4 | West End Elementary School | | March 27, 1986 (#86000600) | March 15, 2000 | Floyd Baker Blvd. and Broad St. | Gaffney | Demolished. |

== See also ==
- List of National Historic Landmarks in South Carolina
- National Register of Historic Places listings in South Carolina
