= Sherratt =

Sherratt may refer to:

People

- Andrew Sherratt (1946–2006), English archaeologist
- Brian Sherratt (educator) (born 1942), Headmaster of Great Barr School in Birmingham, England (1984–2005)
- Brian Sherratt (footballer) (born 1944), footballer
- John Sherratt (born 1923), English former amateur footballer
- Matt Sherratt (born 1976), English rugby union coach
- Robert Simon Sherratt, British engineer

Other

- Sherratt & Hughes or Bowes & Bowes, bookselling and publishing company based in Cambridge, England
- Sherratt Bay, bay between Cape Melville and Penguin Island on the south side of King George Island, in the South Shetland Islands

== See also ==
- Cherat
- Sarratt
- Sharratt
- Surratt
