= Sarratt (disambiguation) =

Sarratt is a village in Hertfordshire, England, and fictional location in John le Carré novels.

Sarratt may also refer to:

== People ==
- Charles Madison Sarratt (1888–1978), American academic and administrator at Vanderbilt University
- Charley Sarratt (born 1923), former American football end who played one season with the Detroit Lions
- Elijah Sarratt (born 2003), American football player
- Jacob Sarratt (1772–1819), English chess player
- Reed Sarratt (1917–1986), American journalist and editor from North Carolina
- Robert Clifton Sarratt (1859–1926), American politician

== Places ==
- Sarratt Bottom nature reserve, a biological Site of Special Scientific Interest in Sarratt, Hertfordshire
- Sarratt Creek, a creek in South Carolina, U.S.

== See also ==
- Sarat (disambiguation)
- Sarrat, a municipality in Ilocos Norte, Philippines
- Surratt, a surname
