= Robert Clifton Sarratt =

American politician

- Born: October 21, 1859
- Died: October 27, 1926 (aged 67)
- Resting place: Oakland Cemetery, Gaffney, South Carolina, U.S.
- Education: Limestone College; Wofford College
- Occupations: Farmer, educator, politician
- Spouse: Frances Amos
- Children: 2 sons (including Charles Madison Sarratt), 2 daughters
- Parent(s): James Madison Sarratt; Julia Ann Lipscomb

Robert Clifton Sarratt (1859–1926) was an American farmer, educator and politician. He served as a member of the South Carolina House of Representatives and the South Carolina Senate, representing Cherokee County, South Carolina.

== Early life ==
Robert Clifton Sarrat was born on October 21, 1859. His father was James Madison Sarratt and his mother, Julia Ann Lipscomb. He had twelve siblings. His paternal family was of Welsh descent. Sarratt Creek was named after his great-grandfather, John Sarratt, who settled in South Carolina prior to the American Revolutionary War.

Sarratt graduated from Limestone College and Wofford College.

== Career ==
Sarratt inherited a farm near Providence, South Carolina. He farmed in the summer and taught school in Gaffney, South Carolina in the winter. He eventually became the city superintendent for all schools in Gaffney.

Sarratt served as a member of the South Carolina House of Representatives and the South Carolina Senate, representing Cherokee County, South Carolina.

== Personal life and death ==
Sarratt married Frances Amos, the daughter of Confederate veteran and Inman cotton plantation owner Charles McAlwreath Amos and granddaughter of Charles Amos, the co-owner of the Cowpens Iron Works and a slaveholder in the antebellum era. Their wedding was held on July 6, 1887 in Spartanburg, South Carolina. They resided on a farm near the Pacolet River on West Frederick Street in Gaffney, South Carolina. They had two sons and two daughters. One of his sons, Charles Madison Sarratt, became a dean of students and later dean of alumni at Vanderbilt University, where the Sarratt Student Center is named in his honor.

Sarratt died on October 27, 1926. His funeral was conducted by a Baptist minister, and he was buried in the Oakland Cemetery in Gaffney, South Carolina.
