= Upton Site =

Upton Site may refer to:

- Upton Site, an archaeological site listed on the National Register of Historic Places near Deming, New Mexico
- Archeological Site 38CK1, an archaeological site listed on the National Register of Historic Places also known as Upton Site near Gaffney, South Carolina
