= Charles Madison Sarratt =

American academic and administrator

- Born: June 21, 1888; Gaffney, South Carolina, U.S.
- Died: March 24, 1978 (aged 89); Nashville, Tennessee, U.S.
- Education: Limestone College; Cornell University
- Occupation: Academic
- Spouse: Mary Dora Houston
- Children: Dr Madison "Houston" Sarratt
- Parent(s): Robert Clifton Sarratt; Frances Amos

Charles Madison Sarratt (1888–1978) was an American academic and administrator. He was the co-author of a textbook on mathematics. He was the chair of the department of mathematics at Vanderbilt University from 1924 to 1946, dean of students from 1939 to 1945, vice-chancellor from 1946 to 1958, and dean of alumni from 1958 to 1978.

== Early life ==
Sarratt was born June 21, 1888, in Gaffney, South Carolina. His father, Robert Clifton Sarratt, served in the South Carolina House of Representatives and the South Carolina Senate. His paternal family was of Welsh descent. His mother, Frances Amos, was the daughter of Confederate veteran and Inman cotton plantation owner Charles McAlwreath Amos and granddaughter of Charles Amos, the co-owner of the Cowpens Iron Works and a slaveholder in the antebellum era.

Sarratt graduated from Limestone College. He then graduated from Cornell University, where he received a bachelor's degree in 1911. He went on to receive a master's degree from Syracuse University in 1915.

== Academic career ==
Sarratt taught in the College of Engineering at Syracuse University from 1913 to 1916. He joined the faculty in the department of mathematics at Vanderbilt University in 1916. He became the dean of men in 1922. Two years later, in 1924, he was appointed chair of the department of mathematics, and served as chair for the next twenty-two years. In 1939, he became dean of students. In 1946, he was appointed as vice-chancellor. He also served as chancellor pro tempore in 1946. From 1958 to 1978, he was retired, yet served as dean of alumni. He was known as "Mr Vanderbilt" or "Dean Sarratt," even after he retired.

With Columbia University professor Thomas Alexander, Sarratt was the co-author of Alexander Sarratt-Arithmetics, a three-volume mathematics textbook published in 1924.

== Civic activities ==
Sarratt was a member of the American Mathematical Society. He was also a member of Phi Beta Kappa, Sigma Xi, and Sigma Nu. He served on the board of directors of the Nashville Chamber of Commerce. He was President of the American Red Cross. He was inducted into the Tennessee Sports Hall of Fame in 1967.

In 1960, Sarratt chaired a committee of black leaders like Stephen J. Wright and Walter S. Davis and white businessmen to put an end to the Nashville sit-ins.

== Personal life ==
Sarratt married Mary Dora Houston in 1922. They had a son, Madison "Houston" Sarratt, who married Martha Haley Davis, the daughter of William Lipscomb Davis.

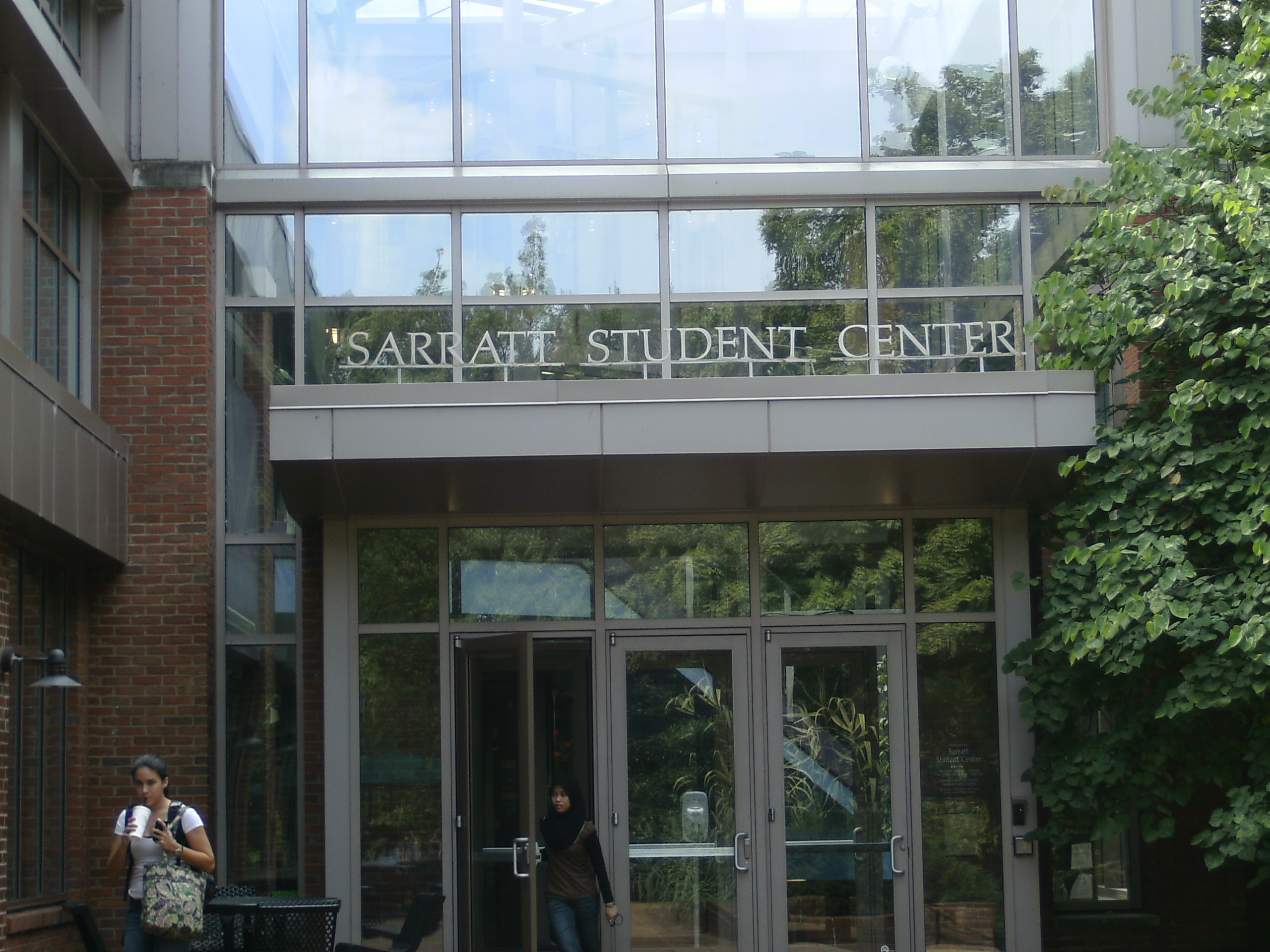
Sarratt Student Center on the campus of Vanderbilt University.

== Death and legacy ==
Sarratt died on March 24, 1978, in Nashville. The Sarratt Student Center on the campus of Vanderbilt University has been named for him since 1974. Inside, the Sarratt Gallery is also named for him. Moreover, his bust is on display there.
