= Stephen Wright =

Stephen Wright may refer to:

== Arts and media ==
- Stephen Wright (DJ) (1954–2024), English radio DJ, radio personality, and occasional television presenter
- Stephen Wright (writer) (born 1946), American writer
- Stevie Wright (1947–2015), English pop singer prominent in Australia

== Sport ==
- Stephen Wright (Australian rules footballer) (born 1961), Australian rules footballer
- Stephen Wright (cricketer) (1897–1975), English cricketer
- Stephen Wright (English footballer) (born 1980), English footballer
- Stephen Wright (Scottish footballer) (born 1971), Scottish footballer

== Others ==
- Stephen Wright (bishop) (born 1970), English bishop
- Stephen Wright (diplomat) (born 1946), British ambassador to Spain
- Stephen J. Wright (1910–1996), American academic administrator and president of the United Negro College Fund

== See also ==
- Steven Wright (disambiguation)
