= Pacolet Soapstone Quarries =

Archaeological site in South Carolina, United States

- Archeological Site 38SP11, 38SP12, 38SP13, 38SP17, 38SP18, 38SP19, 38SP20, 38SP21, 38SP23, 38SP52, 38SP53, 38SP54, 38SP57
- U.S. National Register of Historic Places
- Nearest city: Pacolet, South Carolina
- Area: 3.7 acres (1.5 ha)
- MPS: Pacolet Soapstone Quarries TR
- NRHP reference No.: 80003699
- Added to NRHP: December 10, 1980

Pacolet Soapstone Quarries encompasses 13 historic archaeological sites located near Pacolet, Spartanburg County, South Carolina. It was the site of soapstone procurement activities during the Late Archaic Period (3000 B.C. – 500 B.C.) for the purpose of creating vessels. The quarry sites are characterized by large outcropping boulders of soapstone surrounded by depressions and concentrations of soapstone debris.

The sites were listed on the National Register of Historic Places in 1980.

== See also ==
- Archeological Site 38CK1
- Archeological Site 38CK44
- Archeological Site 38CK45
