= Steven Wright (disambiguation) =

Steven Wright (born 1955) is an American comedian and actor.

Steven, Steve, or Stevie Wright may also refer to:

== Arts and entertainment ==
- Steve Wright (bassist) (1950–2017), bassist with the Greg Kihn Band
- Steve Wright (DJ) (1954–2024; born Stephen), English radio DJ, radio personality, and occasional television presenter
- Steve Wright, English professional wrestler, father and trainer of German professional wrestler Alex Wright

== Sports ==
- Steve Wright (American football, born 1942) (1942–2025), American football offensive tackle
- Steve Wright (American football, born 1959), American football offensive tackle and Survivor contestant
- Steven Wright (baseball) (born 1984), American baseball player
- Steve Wright (footballer, born 1893) (1893–1959), English football player, manager and trainer
- Steve Wright (footballer, born 1959) (born 1959), English footballer
- Steven Wright (rugby union), Scottish international rugby union player

== Others ==
- Steve Wright (trade unionist) (born 1982 or 1983), English trade union leader
- Steven Wright (serial killer) (born 1958), British serial killer
- Stevie Wright (1947–2015; born Stephen), English pop singer prominent in Australia

== See also ==
- Stephen Wright (disambiguation)
