= Elizabeth Eslami =

Irania-American writer

- Born: Gaffney, South Carolina, U.S.
- Education: Sarah Lawrence College (BA); Warren Wilson College (MFA)
- Occupation: Writer
- Website: elizabetheslami.com

Elizabeth Eslami is an Iranian-American writer of novels, essays, and short stories.

== Life ==
Elizabeth Eslami was born in Gaffney, South Carolina. She received her BA from Sarah Lawrence College and her MFA from the Warren Wilson College MFA Program for Writers. Her debut novel, Bone Worship, appeared in 2010. Her essays, short stories, and travel writing have appeared or are forthcoming in The Sun, The Literary Review, Michigan Quarterly Review, Crab Orchard Review, The Millions, Matador Network and others. She is a frequent contributor to The Nervous Breakdown. Her work is also featured in the anthologies Tremors: New Fiction By Iranian American Writers (2013) and Writing Off Script: Writers on the Influence of Cinema (2011). Eslami was awarded the 2013 Ohio State University Short Fiction Prize for her collection of short stories, Hibernate, which was also a finalist for the 2011 Flannery O'Connor Award for Short Fiction.

Eslami taught creative writing at Indiana University from 2014 to 2016. She is now the Hampton and Esther Boswell Distinguished Professor of Creative Writing at DePauw University.

== Personal life ==
As of 2013, Eslami resides in Connecticut. Eslami’s mother is American, while her father is Iranian.

== Awards ==
- 2013 Ohio State University Short Fiction Prize for Hibernate

== Works ==
- Bone Worship. NY: Pegasus Books. 2010. ISBN 1605980749.
- Writing Off Script: Writers on the Influence of Cinema. Calavera Books. 2011.
- Tremors: New Fiction by Iranian American Writers. University of Arkansas Press. 2013.
- Hibernate. Ohio State University Press. 2014.
