= Ellen Furnace Site (38CK68) =

Archaeological site in South Carolina, United States

- U.S. National Register of Historic Places
- Nearest city: Gaffney, South Carolina
- Area: 101 acres (41 ha)
- Built: c. 1838
- MPS: Early Ironworks of Northwestern South Carolina TR
- NRHP reference No.: 87000705
- Added to NRHP: May 8, 1987

Ellen Furnace Site (38CK68) is a historic archaeological site located near Gaffney, Cherokee County, South Carolina. The site includes a partially collapsed but well-preserved iron furnace constructed about 1838 of quarried stone and two earthen sluiceways. Also present are building foundations, tramway road beds, and ore mines. It is directly associated with the nearby Susan Furnace Site. Both were outlying furnace operations associated with the manufacturing complex at Coopersville owned by the Nesbitt Company and later the Swedish Ironworks. The Coopersville Ironworks along with the Susan and Ellen Furnaces were developed between 1835 and 1843 by the Nesbitt Iron Manufacturing Company, the largest iron company in South Carolina. The Nesbitt Company was dissolved in the late 1840s, and the Swedish Iron Manufacturing Company of South Carolina operated the ironworks from 1850 until the American Civil War.

It was listed in the National Register of Historic Places in 1987.
