= Lee Roy Martin =

American serial killer (1937–1972)

- Born: Lee Roy Martin; April 25, 1937; Gaffney, South Carolina, U.S.
- Died: May 31, 1972 (age 35); Central Correctional Institution, Columbia, South Carolina, U.S.
- Cause of death: Stab wounds
- Other name: The Gaffney Strangler
- Conviction: Murder (4 counts)
- Penalty: Life imprisonment

Details
- Victims: 4
- Span of crimes: 1967–1968
- Country: United States
- State: South Carolina
- Date apprehended: February 15, 1969

Lee Roy Martin (April 25, 1937 – May 31, 1972), known as The Gaffney Strangler, was an American serial killer from Gaffney, South Carolina. He murdered four people—two women and two girls—between 1967 and 1968.

== Background ==
When the killings began in 1967, Martin was employed at a textile mill in Cherokee County. He was married and had three children. Martin earned the title of "The Gaffney Strangler", when several women in the Gaffney area went missing, and were eventually found dead. He was infamous in the area. His killing spree lasted until February 27, 1968, the day he was arrested for the murders.

== Annie Lucille Dedmond - Victim #1 ==
On May 20, 1967, 32-year-old Annie Lucille Dedmond was murdered. Annie was found dead in the middle of a road in Union City, South Carolina. Investigators pronounced that the cause of her death was strangulation, and she had experienced severe sexual assault. The police informed Annie's husband, Roger Dedmond, about his wife's murder. Shortly after, he was arrested for the crime. On December 12, 1927, Roger faced a jury that found him guilty of manslaughter. He was sentenced to 18 years in prison. It was not until later that this crime would be correctly pointed to Martin.

== Nancy Christine Rhinehart - Victim #2 ==
Nancy Christine Rhinehart, 14, was killed on February 8, 1968. After visiting with her grandmother, Nancy left for a store in downtown Gaffney. When she did not return, her family became quickly concerned. Her mother called the police when they were made aware of her disappearance. Her body was found buried under a brush pile with one foot sticking out. She had been strangled and raped.

== Nancy Carol Paris - Victim #3 ==
Nine months later, in February 1968, Nancy Carol Parris, 20, was abducted. Her husband had reported her missing when she took their dog for a walk at night and never returned. Police were able to identify that Nancy Parris made a call on a pay phone where she called the place of her husband's work. At the time, her husband was busy and was unable to get to her phone call. Once he returned home, his wife and their dog weren't there. Her nude body was later found on a riverbank beneath a bridge. She had been strangled and raped.

== Martin's Anonymous Call ==
On February 8, 1968, after the third victim was killed, Lee Roy Martin anonymously called Bill Gibbons, then-editor of The Gaffney Ledger. Martin advised Gibbons to take out three different pieces of paper, in preparation for the details from each of the murders he had committed at the time. Martin gave Gibbons directions to locate two bodies. He insisted that he was responsible for the murder of Annie Dedmond, not her husband. Gibbons reported the information to police, who then found the bodies of Parris and Rhinehart. Four days later, Martin contacted Gibbons again, warning that there would be more killings.When Martin called, he said he would continue to kill until he was "shot down like the dog I am." Later that day, Martin anonymously called Gibbons again. He wanted to give more information about Lucille Dedmond, as her husband had been currently serving time in prison for his wrongful conviction for her murder. To prove his guilt, Martin described vivd details about Lucille Dedmond, such as what she was wearing, her pocketbook, and her shoe size. All of the information that Martin relayed on these phone calls was soon handed over to the police.

== Opal Dianne Buckson - Victim #4 ==
About one week after Martin warned Gibbons, 15-year-old Opal Dianne Buckson was abducted and thrown in the trunk of a car while walking to a school bus stop with her sister, Gracie Buckson, on February 13, 1968. Because he sister was only 50 yards away, she was able to give a vivd description of the vehicle to authorities. Gracie described seeing a white man, forcibly shove Opal into the trunk. After her disappearance, the Gaffney community became quickly involved. Henry Transou, Walter Price, and Lester Skinner joined together to search for Buckson. When driving down a wooded area off Highway 11, the three men spotted a suspicious car and began to follow it. The men notified the police immediately which eventually led to the finding of Buckson's nude body in a wooded area several days later. There were indications of a struggle, and that she had been strangled and stabbed to death.

== Investigation, arrest, and trial ==
After learning of Opal Buckson's abduction on the morning of February 13, local residents Henry Transou and Lester Skinner were patrolling the area, looking for a car that matched the description given over the radio by local police. Within hours of the abduction, they saw a car backing down a dirt path in a heavily wooded area and a man standing beside it. When they drove by, the man quickly got inside and drove away. They wrote down the vehicle's plate numbers and reported what they'd seen to police. Investigators later found Buckson's body nearby, where Martin's car had been spotted.

Martin was arrested on February 27, 1968. The Sheriff took evidence from Martin and questioned him. Martin directed them to the location of bodies. However, in the process, Martin was not given adequate right to counsel and pleaded guilty to the crimes. Therefore, he could not legally receive a sentence to death row. Martin was convicted of first-degree murder in the deaths of Dedmond, Parris, Rhinehart, and Buckson. He received four life terms. He remained incarcerated until his death in 1972.

Because he committed such heinous crimes, he was sent to State Hospital in Columbia, South Carolina, to receive a psychological evaluation. From this, physicians reported did not report him to be legally insane. This evaluation was completed before his court hearings, which was used in defense's arguments against him.

After Martin's arrest, Roger Dedmond, who was ten months into his prison sentence, was released from Union County Prison Camp on March 1, 1968. All charges against him in the murder of his wife were dropped.

While the popular conception of Martin's motive was that he was "after young women," in prison interviews and in discussions with his mother, Martin himself said he had a split personality, including a violent side that took control of him.

== Death ==
On May 31, 1972, while incarcerated at Central Correctional Institution in Columbia, Martin was stabbed to death by fellow inmate Kenneth Marshall Rumsey. Rumsey killed himself in prison five years later.

== Timeline ==
- May 20, 1967: Annie Lucille Dedmond is murdered.
- February 8, 1968: The bodies of Nancy Parris and Nancy Rhinehart are discovered.
- February 13, 1968: Opal Buckson is abducted.
- February 16, 1968: Opal's body is discovered.
- February 27, 1968: Martin is arrested and charged for four counts of first degree murder.
- May 31, 1972: Martin is stabbed to death while incarcerated.

== See also ==
- List of serial killers in the United States
