= WFGN =

- Gaffney, South Carolina; United States
- Frequency: 1180 kHz

Programming
- Format: Religious

Ownership
- Owner: Hope Broadcasting, Inc.

History
- First air date: March 8, 1948

Technical information
- Licensing authority: FCC
- Facility ID: 72057
- Class: D
- Power: 2,500 watts day
- Transmitter coordinates: 35°2′59.00″N 81°38′42.00″W

Links
- Public license information: Public file; LMS

WFGN (1180 AM) is a radio station broadcasting religious content. Licensed to Gaffney, South Carolina, United States, the station is owned by Hope Broadcasting, Inc.

== History ==
The station went on the air March 8, 1948, as WFGN broadcasting on 1570 kHz with 250 W power (daytime). The licensee was Cherokee Radio Company Incorporated.
