= Peachoid =

Water tower in Gaffney, South Carolina

Coordinates: 35°5′43″N 81°41′9″W

The Peachoid

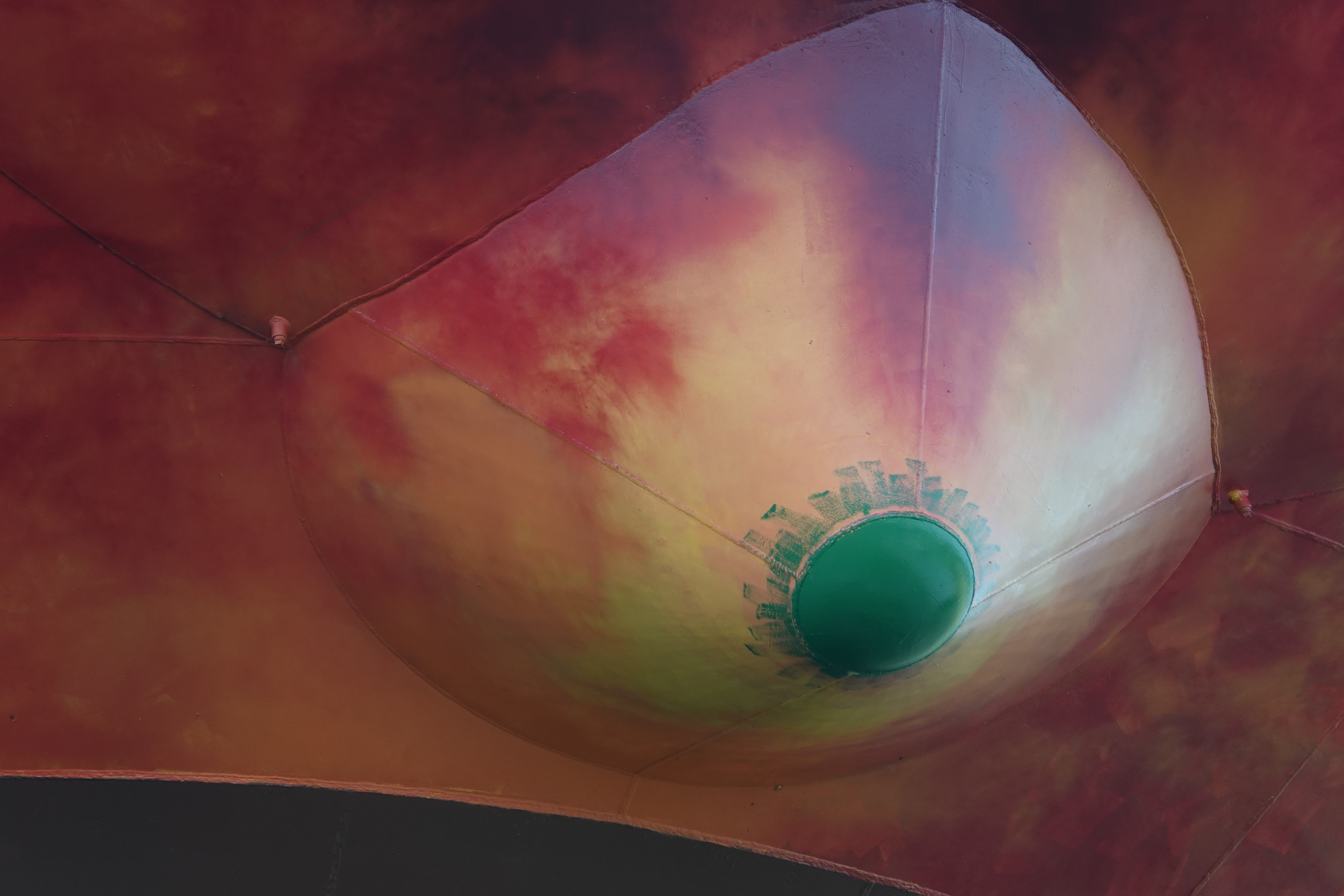
Closeup view of the bottom of the Peachoid, 2018

The Peachoid is a 135 foot (41 m) tall water tower in Gaffney, South Carolina, U.S., that was built in 1981 to resemble a peach. The water tower holds one million U.S. gallons (3.78541 million litres) of water and is located off Peachoid Road by Interstate 85 between exits 90 and 92 (near the Cherokee Foothills Scenic Highway). Usually referred to by locals as "The Peach" and by passing motorists as "Mr. Peach" or "The Moon over Gaffney", the water tank is visible for several miles around these exits.

An example of novelty architecture, the Peachoid is one of the most recognizable landmarks for travelers along I-85 between Charlotte, North Carolina, and Atlanta, Georgia.

== History ==
The water tower was built in 1981, by the Chicago Bridge and Iron Company, of steel and concrete. An overlay stem and leaf were laid across the structure, an enormous "cleft" was created with steel paneling, and Peter Freudenberg, an artist who worked with macro-art, painted the structure to realistically resemble a peach. The foundation and sub-contract work was performed by Ford Construction Company of Selma, Alabama.

The Peachoid was commissioned by the Gaffney Board of Public Works, who had a need for elevated water storage and wished to find a way of building it using federal funding. The shape of the peach was selected because the Gaffney economy was then dependent upon peach orchards, and because the people of the town wanted to make clear that South Carolina, and at one time, Cherokee County alone, where Gaffney is located, produced more peaches per year than the entire state of Georgia (known as the "Peach State"). Since its construction, the Peachoid's extremely high visibility has introduced an element of tourism to the local economy, and a smaller (500,000 U.S. gallons, 1.9 million liters) peachoid has been built for Clanton, Alabama by the same company.

In February 2018, the Gaffney Board of Public Works installed a 6-foot tall chain-link security fence around the Peachoid in response to years of continued vandalism.

== In popular culture ==
The Peachoid was a focal plot point in Chapter 3 of House of Cards, where there was concern that the structure resembles female genitalia and/or buttocks. In the episode, Frank Underwood, as a native of Gaffney, keeps a photo of the Peachoid in his office, and it becomes the subject of a political and potentially legal battle for Frank after a young woman dies in a car accident, distracted by the Peachoid.

The Peachoid finds mention in the Gregg Hurwitz novel "Hellbent“, Part 3 of the Orphan X series, when the protagonist Evan Smoak recognizes the landmark on a video feed taken from a crashing helicopter at night. Mistakenly, he travels to Gaffney, not being aware of the second, identical yet smaller version in Clanton, to find clues on the events leading up to the helicopter crash.
