= Sharratt =

Sharratt may refer to:

== People with surname Sharratt ==
- Bryan Sharratt (1947–2007), US attorney
- Harry Sharratt (1929–2009), British athlete in football
- Henry Sharratt, English rugby league footballer who played in the 1950s and 1960s
- John Sharratt (1850–1892), English cricketer
- Nicholas Sharratt, English operatic tenor
- Nick Sharratt (born 1962), British artist
- Paul Sharratt (1933–2009), British television personality
- Martin Sharratt (born 1964), British artist, writer, and musician

== Other ==
- George Sharratt Pearson (1880–1966), English-born wholesale grocer, political figure in British Columbia
- Pringle Richards Sharratt (formed 1996), British architectural firm

== See also ==
- Charrat
- Sarratt
- Sarrot
- Surratt
