= The Gaffney Ledger =

American tri-weekly newspaper

The Gaffney Ledger is a tri-weekly newspaper in Gaffney, South Carolina. It was founded in 1896 under the name The Ledger, and assumed its current name in 1907. The paper has been owned and published by the Sossamon family for five generations.

Lee Roy Martin - the "Gaffney Strangler" - first claimed credit for his victims in a phone call to the paper's then managing editor Bill Gibbons in February 1968. In 1999 the former chief of police of Blacksburg, South Carolina successfully sued the Gaffney Ledger for libel after it ran an anonymous op-ed from a reader which implied he had been bribed by drug dealers.
