= Robert Simon Sherratt =

Robert Simon Sherratt from the University of Reading, Reading, Berkshire, UK was named Fellow of the Institute of Electrical and Electronics Engineers (IEEE) in 2012 for contributions to embedded signal processing in consumer electronic devices and products.
