= Steven Wright (rugby union) =

Scotland international rugby union player

- Full name: Steven Terence Howard Wright
- Born: 14 February 1927
- Died: 1 July 1965 (aged 38)
- School: Stewart's College
- University: University of Edinburgh

Rugby union career
- Position: Prop
International career
Years	Team	Apps	(Points)
1949	Scotland	1	(0)

Steven Terence Howard Wright (14 February 1927 — 1 July 1965) was a Scottish international rugby union player.

Wright attended Stewart's College in Edinburgh, where in addition to playing rugby he captained the cricket XI. He was dux of the school in 1945 and pursued further studies at the University of Edinburgh.

A Stewart's College FP prop, Wright was capped for Scotland in a 1949 Calcutta Cup match against England at Twickenham, replacing an injured Hamish Dawson in the front-row.

Wright played for English club Cheltenham during the 1950s.

== See also ==
- List of Scotland national rugby union players
