= Carnegie Free Library (Gaffney, South Carolina) =

- U.S. National Register of Historic Places
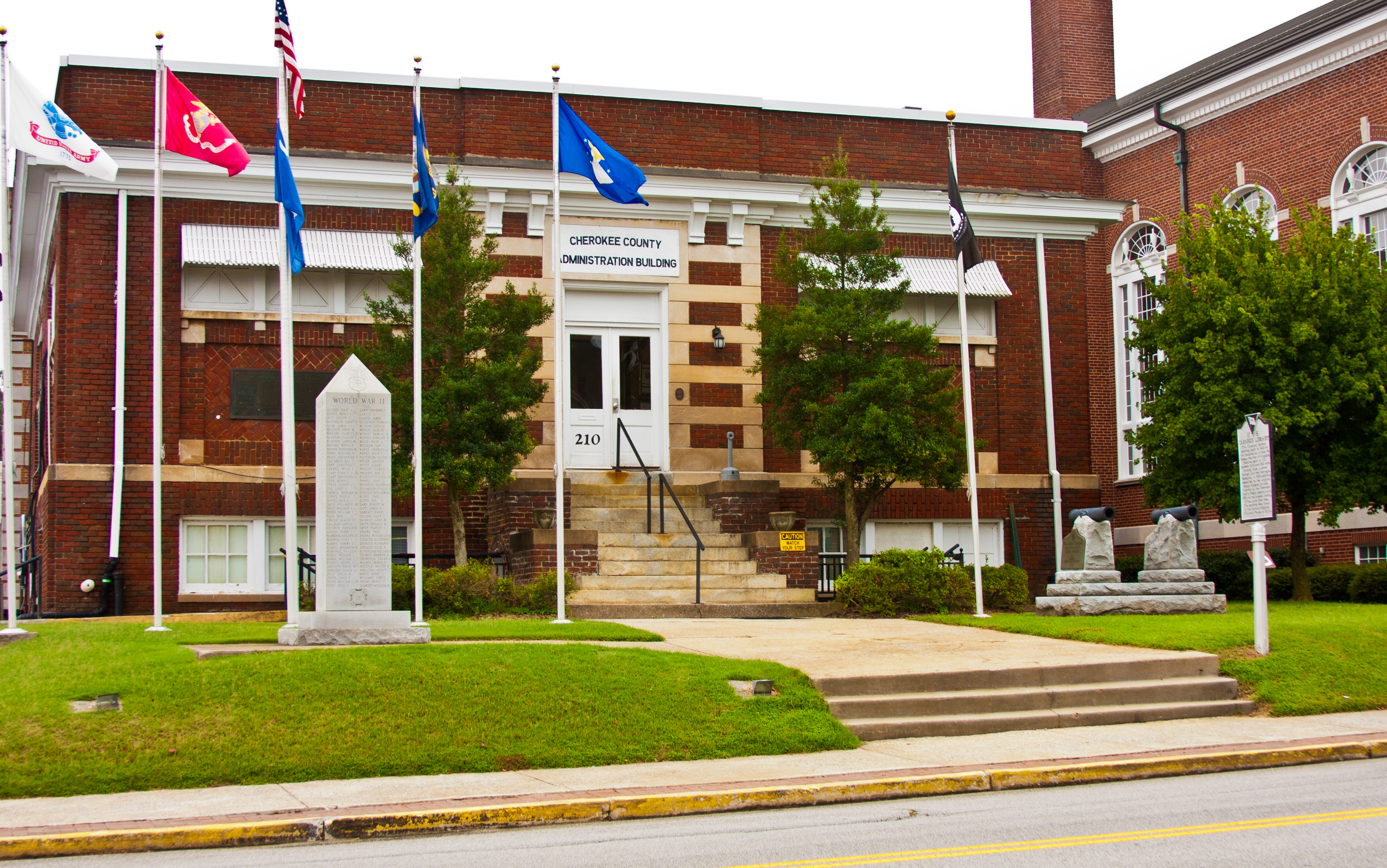
- Carnegie Free Library, September 2012

- Location within South Carolina Location within the United States
- Location: 210 N. Limestone St., Gaffney, South Carolina
- Coordinates: 35°4′25″N 81°38′54″W
- Area: less than one acre
- Architect: Hamby, Arthur W.; Miller, S.A.
- Architectural style: Classical Revival
- NRHP reference No.: 00000587
- Added to NRHP: June 2, 2000

Carnegie Free Library is a historic Carnegie library building located at Gaffney, Cherokee County, South Carolina. It was built in 1913–1914, and is a one-story over raised basement, rectangular red brick Classical Revival style building. It has a gently pitched standing seam metal roof and a brick parapet. In 1937, it was doubled in size by a rear addition. It is one of 14 public libraries built in South Carolina between 1903 and 1916 with funding from Andrew Carnegie and the Carnegie Foundation, and was Gaffney's first public library.

It was listed in the National Register of Historic Places in 2000. The building no longer contains a lending library. Today, the Cherokee County Public Library System operates a branch in Gaffney at 300 East Rutledge Avenue.
