= Magness-Humphries House =

Historic house in South Carolina, United States

- U.S. National Register of Historic Places
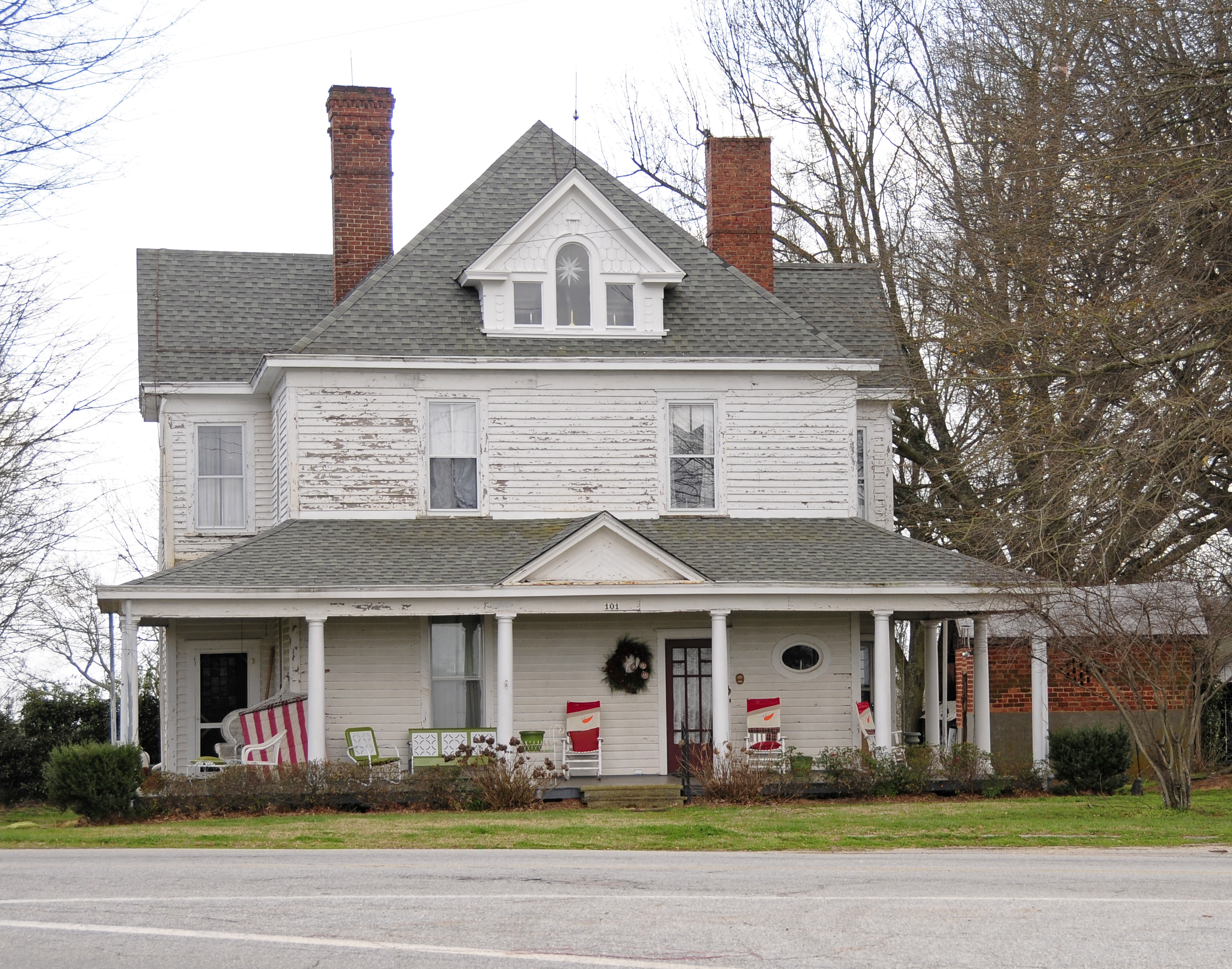
- Magness-Humphries House, March 2012

- Location within South Carolina Location within the United States
- Location: 101 Grassy Pond Rd., near Gaffney, South Carolina
- Coordinates: 35°08′08″N 81°40′26″W
- Area: 44.7 acres (18.1 ha)
- Built: 1871, 1904
- Architectural style: Queen Anne
- NRHP reference No.: 01001159
- Added to NRHP: October 20, 2001

Magness-Humphries House is a historic home and farm located near Gaffney, Cherokee County, South Carolina. It was built in 1904, and is a two-story, frame Queen Anne / Classical Revival style farmhouse on brick and rock piers. It features a steep hipped roof and decorative chimneys. The property includes a barn, smoke house/potato house, and gear room. They date to 1871. Other outbuildings include a chicken/hen house built about 1918, a dibby house and pump house built in the 1940s, and several others built in the 1950s. James Judson Magness established a home and farm in 1871; his original home was destroyed by fire in 1904.

It was listed in the National Register of Historic Places in 2001.
