= Irene Mill Finishing Plant =

Historic American factory

- U.S. National Register of Historic Places
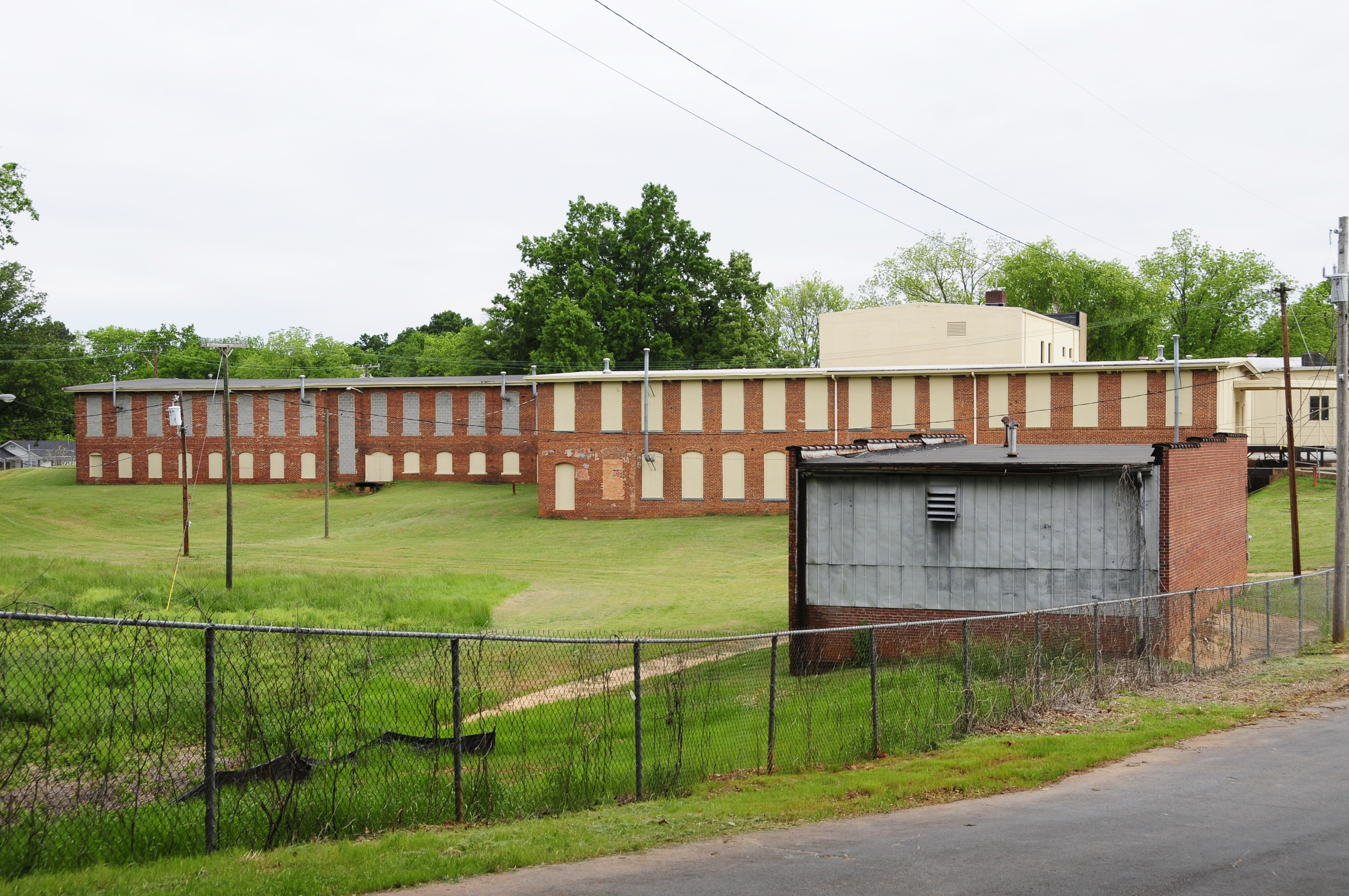
- Irene Mill Finishing Plant, April 2012

- Location within South Carolina Location within the United States
- Location: W side of Buford St. between Liberty and Logan Sts., Gaffney, South Carolina
- Coordinates: 35°4′28″N 81°38′36″W
- Area: 2.7 acres (1.1 ha)
- Built: 1916
- MPS: Gaffney MRA
- NRHP reference No.: 86000591
- Added to NRHP: March 27, 1986

Irene Mill Finishing Plant, also known as the Cherokee Finishing Company, is a historic factory building located at Gaffney, Cherokee County, South Carolina, United States of America. The building was constructed in 1915–1916, and is a large, rectangular, one-story brick building with a gable roof with exposed support beams. Also on the property are two small, square brick structures with pyramidal roofs covered with pressed metal shingles. The mill produced damask which was shipped to New England for finishing. In the finishing plant the cloth was washed, soaked, boiled, bleached, and calendered, enabling the mill to produce finished damask products.

It was listed on the National Register of Historic Places in 1986.
