= Jefferies House =

Historic house in South Carolina, United States

- U.S. National Register of Historic Places
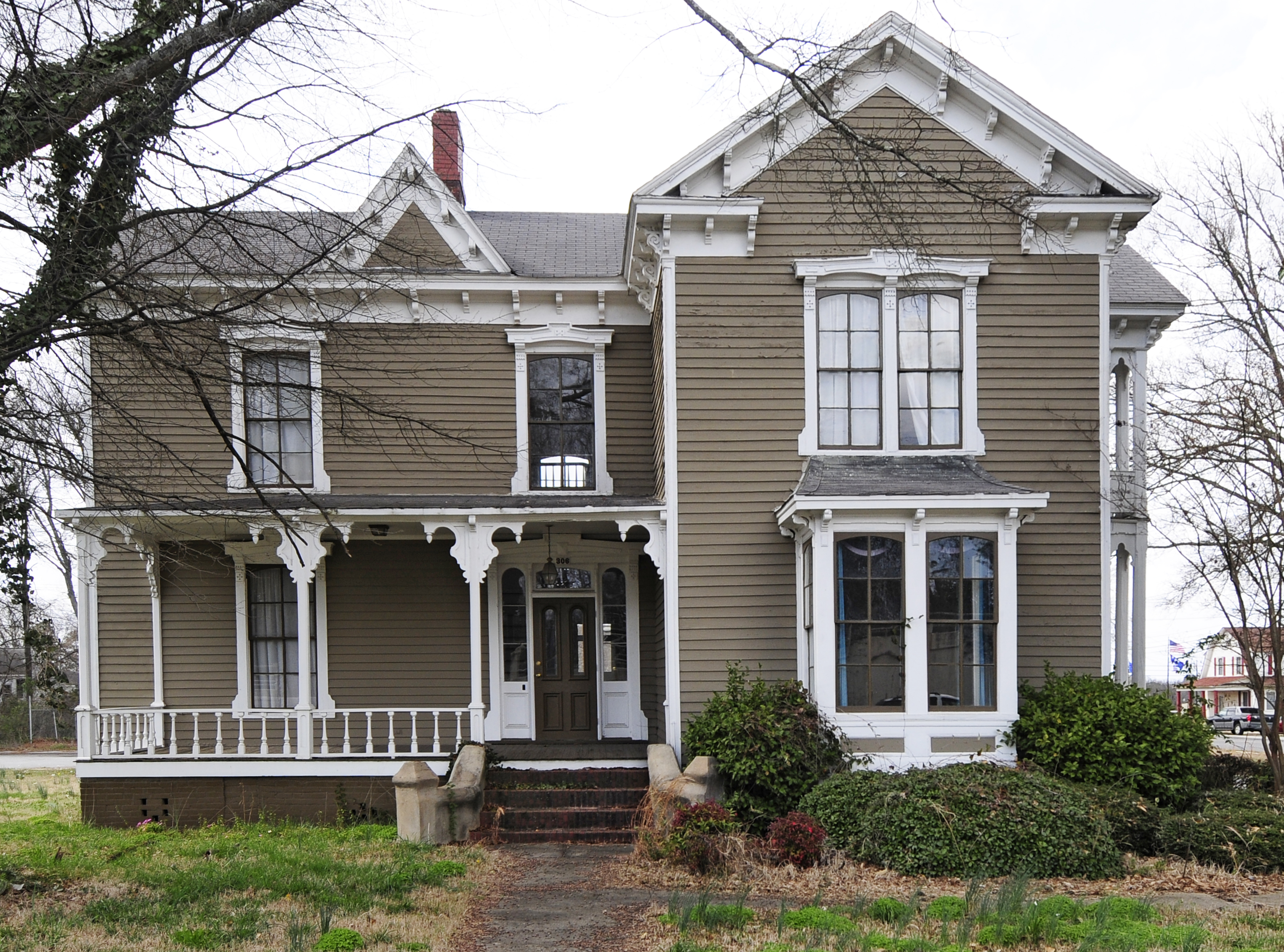
- Jeffries House, March 2012

- Location within South Carolina Location within the United States
- Location: 306 S. Grannard St., Gaffney, South Carolina
- Coordinates: 35°4′16″N 81°39′11″W
- Area: 1 acre (0.40 ha)
- Built: 1884
- Built by: Baker, Leander
- Architectural style: Italianate
- MPS: Gaffney MRA
- NRHP reference No.: 86000594
- Added to NRHP: March 27, 1986

Jefferies House, also known as the Jolly House, is a historic home located at Gaffney, Cherokee County, South Carolina. It was built in 1884, and is a two-story, frame, Italianate style dwelling. It is asymmetrical and features a large one-story porch on the main façade and a two-tiered porch on the right elevation. Also on the main façade is a one-story square bay window with decorative brackets. It is one of the oldest and most significant residences remaining in Gaffney.

It was listed in the National Register of Historic Places in 1986.
