= Thicketty Mountain Ore Pits (38CK74) =

Archaeological site in South Carolina, United States

- U.S. National Register of Historic Places
- Nearest city: Shady Grove Church, South Carolina
- Area: 8.3 acres (3.4 ha)
- MPS: Early Ironworks of Northwestern South Carolina TR
- NRHP reference No.: 87000711
- Added to NRHP: May 8, 1987

Thicketty Mountain Ore Pits (38CK74) is a historic archaeological site located near Shady Grove Church, Cherokee County, South Carolina. The site includes iron ore pits associated with the South Carolina Manufacturing Company, a major iron manufacturing company that operated in Spartanburg County between about 1825 and about 1850. The iron ore pits or surface mines cover several forested acres along a gently sloping ridge and are generally depressions about two to three meters deep and about five to ten meters across. The pits were last operational in the 1850s.

It was listed in the National Register of Historic Places in 1987.
