= Archeological Site 38CK44 =

Archaeological site in South Carolina, United States

- U.S. National Register of Historic Places
- Nearest city: Gaffney, South Carolina
- Area: 4 acres (1.6 ha)
- MPS: Pacolet Soapstone Quarries TR
- NRHP reference No.: 80003662
- Added to NRHP: December 10, 1980

Archeological Site 38CK44, also known as Locus 1, is a historic archaeological site located near Gaffney, Cherokee County, South Carolina. The site contains well preserved examples of a specialized soapstone procurement site occupied primarily during the prehistoric, Late Archaic Period (3000 BC – 500 BC).

It was listed in the National Register of Historic Places in 1980.

== See also ==
- Pacolet Soapstone Quarries
