= Settlemyer House =

Historic house in South Carolina, United States

- U.S. National Register of Historic Places
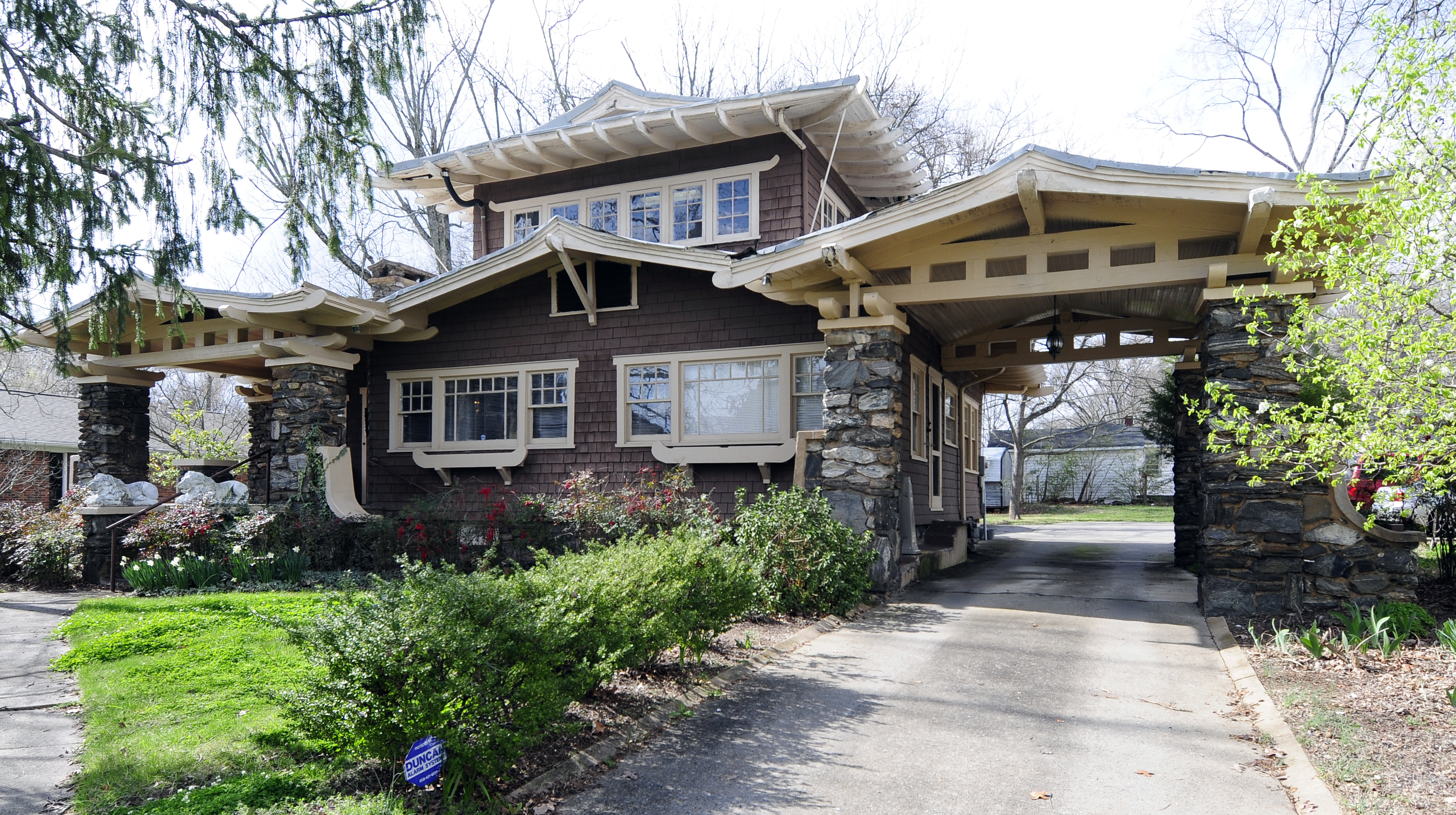
- Settlemeyer House, March 2012

- Location within South Carolina Location within the United States
- Location: 915 N. Limehouse St., Gaffney, South Carolina
- Coordinates: 35°4′47″N 81°38′36″W
- Area: 0.5 acres (0.20 ha)
- Built: 1922
- Architectural style: Bungalow/craftsman, Japanese style
- MPS: Gaffney MRA
- NRHP reference No.: 86000598
- Added to NRHP: March 27, 1986

Settlemyer House, also known as the Bailey House, is a historic home located at Gaffney, Cherokee County, South Carolina. It was built in 1922, and consists of a large two-story central block with one-story wings. It features a low gable roof with flared rafter tails and a porte-cochere with flared eaves and large random course stone and concrete piers. It is an example of the Japanese influenced Bungalow design, in the American Craftsman tradition, of the early 1920s. Also on the property is an original two-story frame garage and a random course stone and concrete wall in front of the house.

It was listed on the National Register of Historic Places in 1986.
