= Stephen J. Wright =

American academic administrator

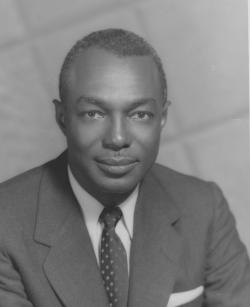
- Born: Stephen Junius Wright Jr. September 8, 1910; Dillon, South Carolina
- Died: April 16, 1996 (aged 85); Baltimore, Maryland, U.S.
- Education: Hampton University; Howard University; New York University
- Occupation: University administrator
- Known for: President of Fisk University (1957–1966)
- Spouse: Rosalind Wright

Stephen Junius Wright Jr. (September 8, 1910 – April 16, 1996) was an American academic administrator. He served as the seventh president of Fisk University, a historically black university in Nashville, Tennessee, from 1957 to 1966. He was also the president of the United Negro College Fund. In 1960, Wright served on a committee chaired by Madison Sarratt to put an end to the Nashville sit-ins.

Wright served on the National Commission for Libraries appointed by President Lyndon B. Johnson.
