= Nesbitt's Limestone Quarry (38CK69) =

Archaeological site in South Carolina, United States

- U.S. National Register of Historic Places
- Nearest city: Gaffney, South Carolina
- Area: 50 acres (20 ha)
- MPS: Early Ironworks of Northwestern South Carolina TR
- NRHP reference No.: 87000710
- Added to NRHP: May 8, 1987

Nesbitt's Limestone Quarry (38CK69) is a historic archaeological site located near Gaffney, Cherokee County, South Carolina. The site includes the most extensive and best preserved limestone quarry associated with early iron production in the northwestern Piedmont of South Carolina. It was the primary source of limestone for the region's ironworks. Quarrying activity at Nesbitt's ceased in the early part of the 20th century. The site covers approximately 30 acres and has exposed vertical faces of limestone and is located in a large body of limestone that extend in a linear fashion from Limestone College to across the South Carolina state line.

It was listed in the National Register of Historic Places in 1987.
