= Gaffney Residential Historic District =

Historic district in South Carolina, United States

- U.S. National Register of Historic Places
- U.S. Historic district
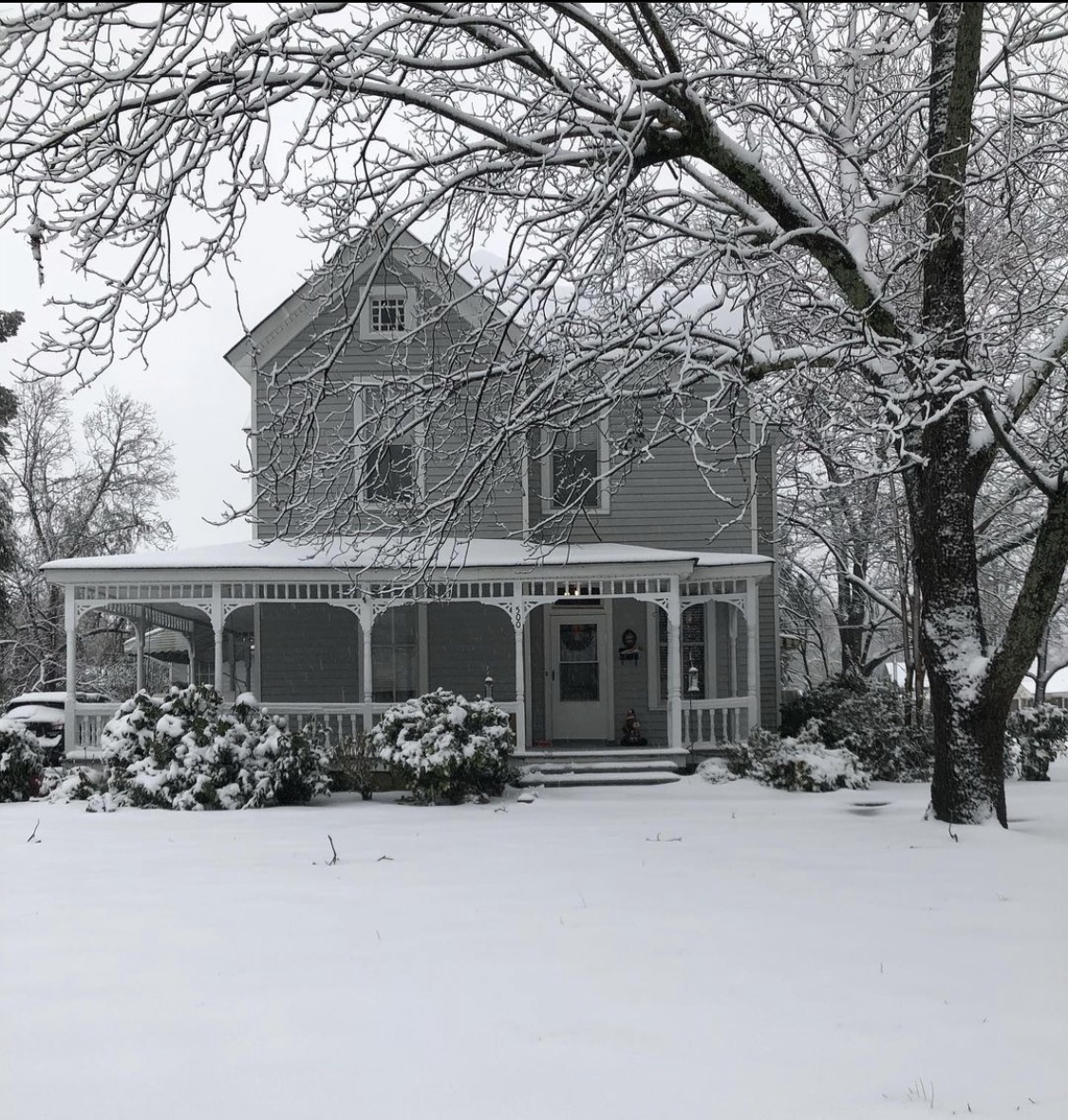
- Queen Anne style historic home on East Rutledge Ave

- Location within South Carolina Location within the United States
- Location: Roughly bounded by Floyd Baker Blvd., Johnson and Thompson Sts., Rutledge and Fairview Aves., and Limestone St., Gaffney, South Carolina
- Coordinates: 35°4′1″N 81°38′54″W
- Area: 71.7 acres (29.0 ha)
- Architectural style: Colonial Revival, Classical Revival, Bungalow/craftsman, Queen Anne
- MPS: Gaffney MRA
- NRHP reference No.: 86000601
- Added to NRHP: March 27, 1986

Gaffney Residential Historic District national historic district located at Gaffney, Cherokee County, South Carolina. The district encompasses 111 contributing building in a primarily residential area of Gaffney. The majority of the buildings were built between about 1890 and about 1930, and consist of houses sited on large urban lots and oriented towards wide, tree-lined streets. Homes are generally of frame or brick construction with fine examples of the Queen Anne, Colonial Revival, Neoclassical, Victorian and Bungalow styles as well as traditional vernacular forms. Included in the district are homes of textile mill executives, merchants, and other professionals who lived in Gaffney during its boom period at the turn of the 20th century.

It was listed on the National Register of Historic Places in 1986.
