= Gaffney Commercial Historic District =

Historic district in South Carolina, United States

- U.S. National Register of Historic Places
- U.S. Historic district
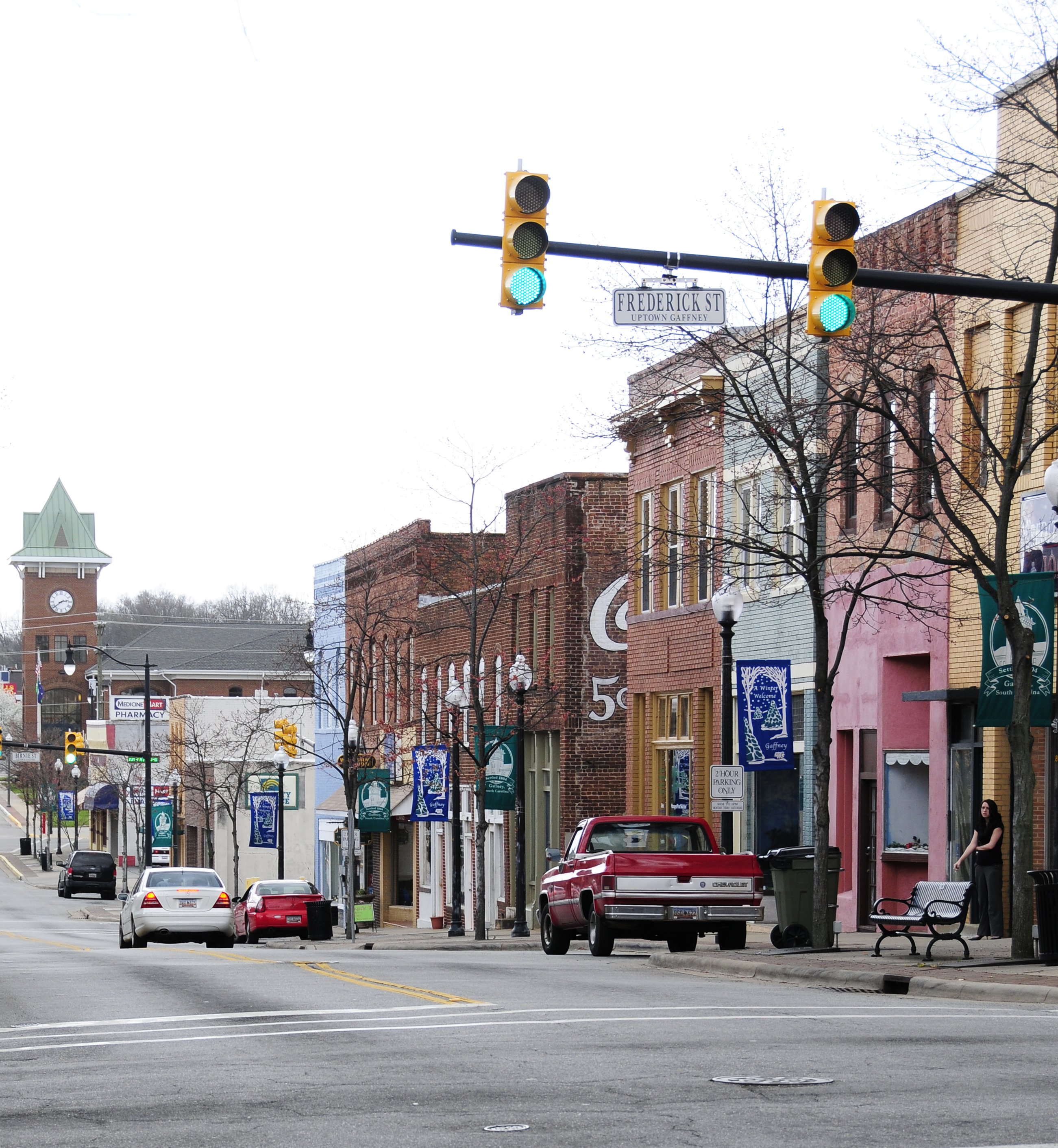
- Gaffney Commercial Historic District, March 2012

- Location within South Carolina Location within the United States
- Location: Roughly N. Limestone St. between Cherokee Ave. and E. Meadow St., Gaffney, South Carolina
- Coordinates: 35°4′20″N 81°38′50″W
- Area: 7.5 acres (3.0 ha)
- Architectural style: Classical Revival, Italianate, Romanesque
- MPS: Gaffney MRA
- NRHP reference No.: 86000602
- Added to NRHP: March 27, 1986

Gaffney Commercial Historic District is a national historic district located in Gaffney, Cherokee County, South Carolina. The district encompasses 41 contributing buildings in the central business district of Gaffney. Most of the buildings were constructed between 1900 and 1930 and are primarily commercial buildings in vernacular interpretations of the Italianate, Romanesque Revival, Renaissance Revival, Art Deco, and Neoclassical styles. All the buildings are constructed of brick and vary in height from one to four stories. The downtown area, which remains a center of Gaffney commerce, retains much of its early 20th-century character.

It was listed on the National Register of Historic Places in 1986.
