= Sarratt Creek =

Creek in South Carolina, U.S

Coordinates: 35°09′32″N 81°39′56″W

Sarratt Creek is a creek in South Carolina, U.S. It is a tributary of Ross Creek, and both creeks flow into the Broad River. It was named in honor of John Sarratt, a settler of Welsh descent. In 1967, its water contained monazite.
