= Coopersville Ironworks Site (38CK2) and Susan Furnace Site (38CK67) =

Archaeological site in South Carolina, United States

- U.S. National Register of Historic Places
- Nearest city: Gaffney, South Carolina
- Area: 690 acres (280 ha)
- Built: 1835-1843
- MPS: Early Ironworks of Northwestern South Carolina TR (AD)
- NRHP reference No.: 76001699
- Added to NRHP: November 13, 1976

Coopersville Ironworks Site (38CK2) and Susan Furnace Site (38CK67), also known as the Cherokee Ford Ironworks Site and Nesbitt Iron Manufacturing Co., is a historic archaeological site located near Gaffney, Cherokee County, South Carolina. The site includes the foundations of four large factory buildings, with a system of canal/sluiceways between them, and the remains of three iron furnaces. The outlying furnace, Susan Furnace, includes foundations, sluiceways, slag heaps, and adjacent ore pits. The complex is the largest and best preserved factory complex of any of the 19th century iron manufacturing companies of the region. The complex was developed between 1835 and 1843 by the Nesbitt Iron Manufacturing Company, the largest iron company in South Carolina. The Nesbitt Company was dissolved in the late 1840s, and the Swedish Iron Manufacturing Company of South Carolina operated the ironworks from 1850 until the American Civil War.

It was listed in the National Register of Historic Places in 1976.
