= Surratt =

Surratt is a surname. Notable people with the surname include:

- Alfred Surratt (1922–2010), American baseball player
- Chazz Surratt (born 1997), American football linebacker
- Edward Surratt (born 1941), American convicted murderer and rapist
- John Surratt (1844–1916), American Confederate Spy and conspirator in the assassination of Abraham Lincoln
- Mary Surratt (1823–1865), American woman convicted as a conspirator in the assassination of Abraham Lincoln
- Sage Surratt (born 1998), American football tight end
- Valeska Suratt (1882–1962), American actress

== See also ==
- Sarratt (disambiguation)
