= Archeological Site 38CK1 =

Archaeological site in South Carolina, United States

- U.S. National Register of Historic Places
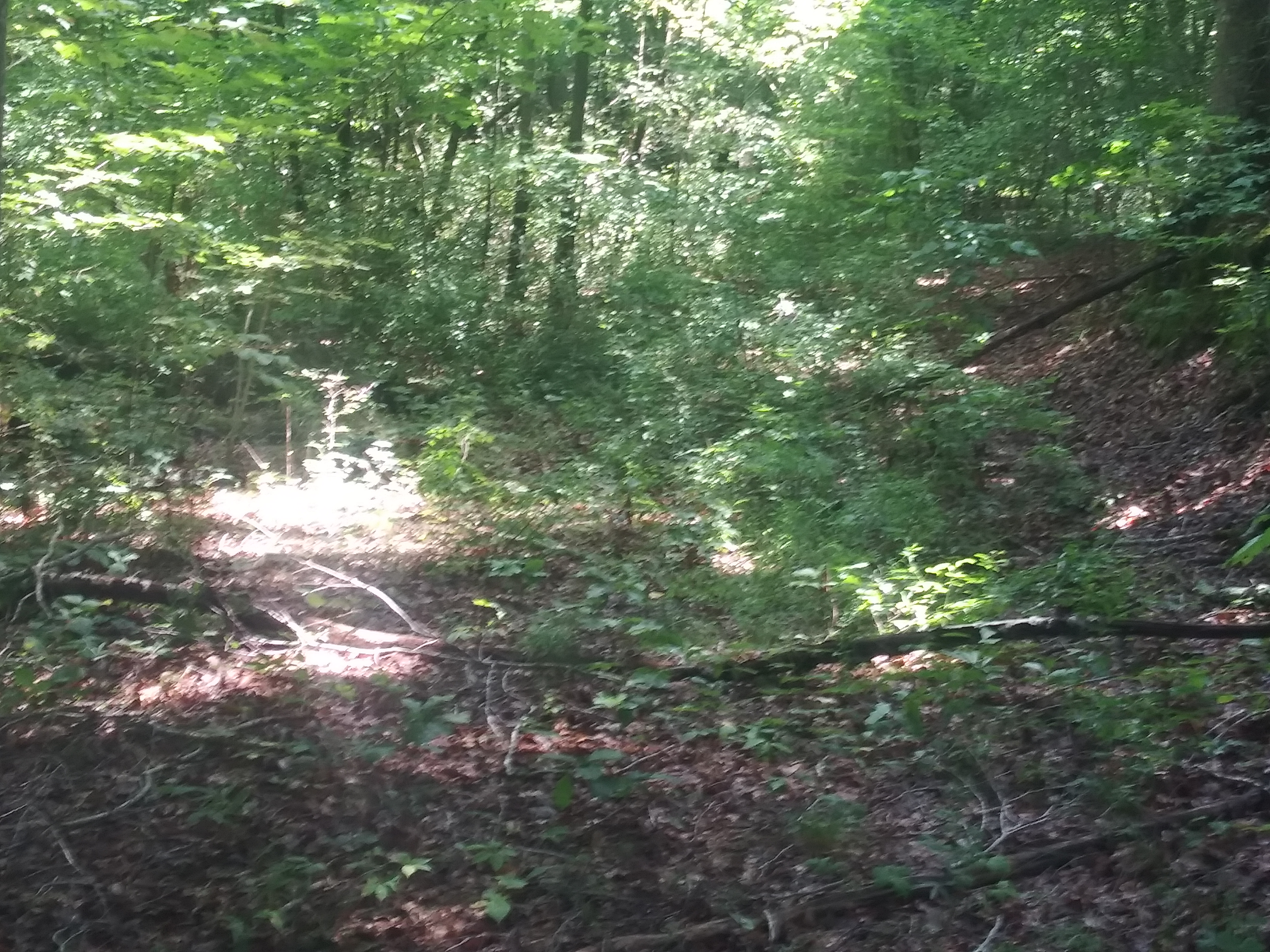
- Nearest city: Gaffney, South Carolina
- Area: 13.8 acres (5.6 ha)
- MPS: Pacolet Soapstone Quarries TR
- NRHP reference No.: 80003661
- Added to NRHP: December 10, 1980

Archeological Site 38CK1, also known as the Upton Site, is a historic archaeological site located near Gaffney, Cherokee County, South Carolina. The site contains well preserved examples of a specialized soapstone procurement site occupied primarily during the prehistoric, Late Archaic Period (3000 BC – 500 BC). The site is divided into two major areas and the quarry exhibits both historic and prehistoric utilization.

It was listed in the National Register of Historic Places in 1980.

== See also ==
- Pacolet Soapstone Quarries
