= Cowpens Furnace Site (38CK73) =

Archaeological site in South Carolina, United States

- U.S. National Register of Historic Places
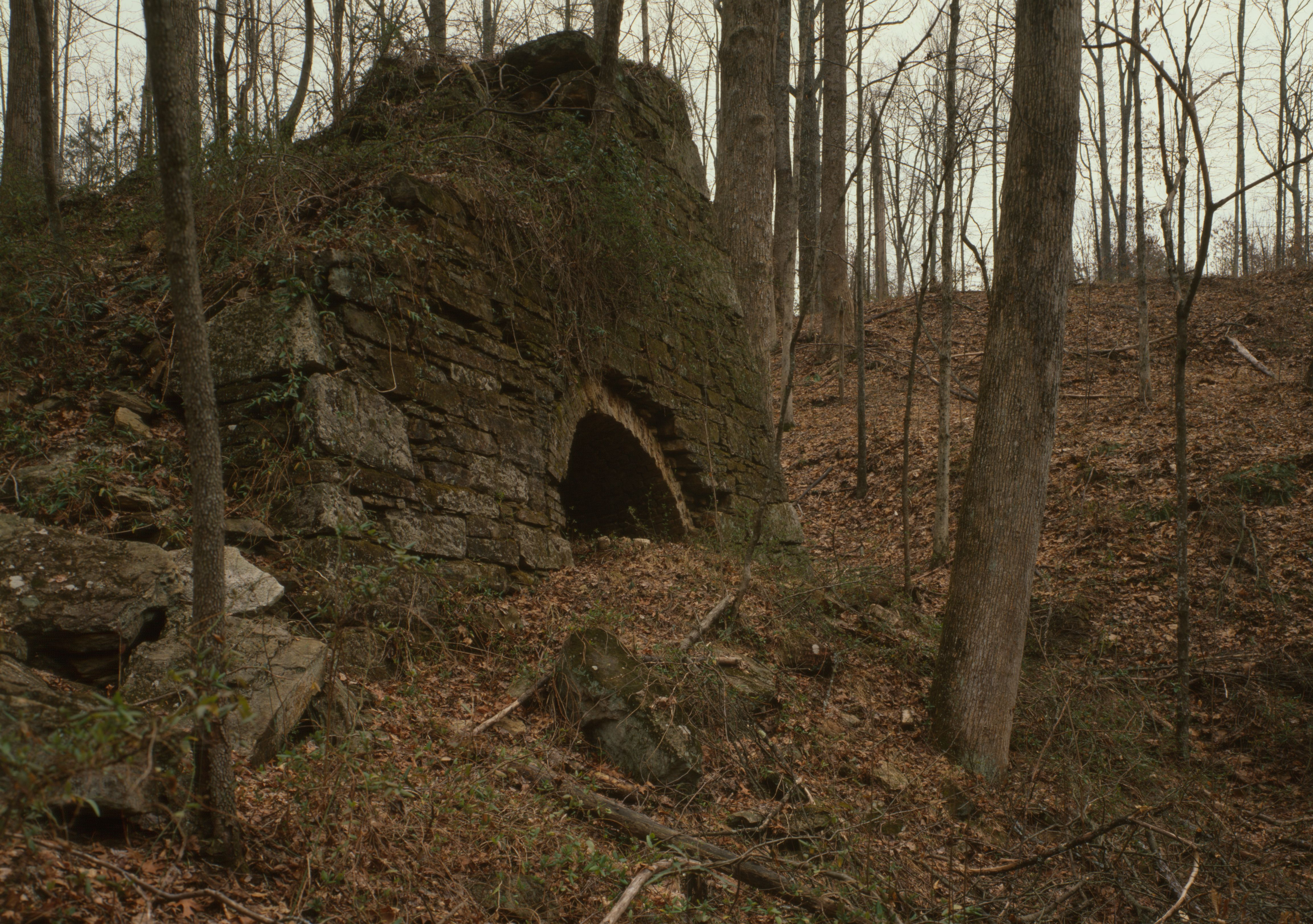
- Cowpens Iron Furnace
- Location: Cherokee County, South Carolina
- Nearest city: Gaffney, South Carolina
- Area: 15 acres (6.1 ha)
- Built: ca. 1807 rebuilt 1834
- NRHP reference No.: 87000704
- Added to NRHP: May 8, 1987

Cowpens Furnace Site (38CK73) is the remains of an early 19th-century iron-making furnace in Cherokee County, South Carolina. The site shows early American iron-making technology. The site was listed on the National Register of Historic Places in 1987.

Iron making began in Upstate South Carolina just before the Revolutionary War. The iron making furnaces were located in areas that had deposits of iron ore and limestone, forests to supply wood to make charcoal, and water power to operate the bellows. In the 1850s, the local iron works faced increased competition from Northern furnaces using anthracite coal to produce iron that could be easily transported by rail.

The furnace was constructed around 1807. In 1834, it was purchased and rebuilt by the South Carolina Manufacturing Company, which was located in Spartanburg County, South Carolina. The furnace was operated until around 1850. Although the furnace has partially collapsed, parts of it are over 20 ft (6.1 m) tall. In addition to the furnace, the road bed, a flat unloading area above the furnace, and heaps of ore, charcoal, and slag remain on the site.
