= Gaffney, South Carolina =

- City
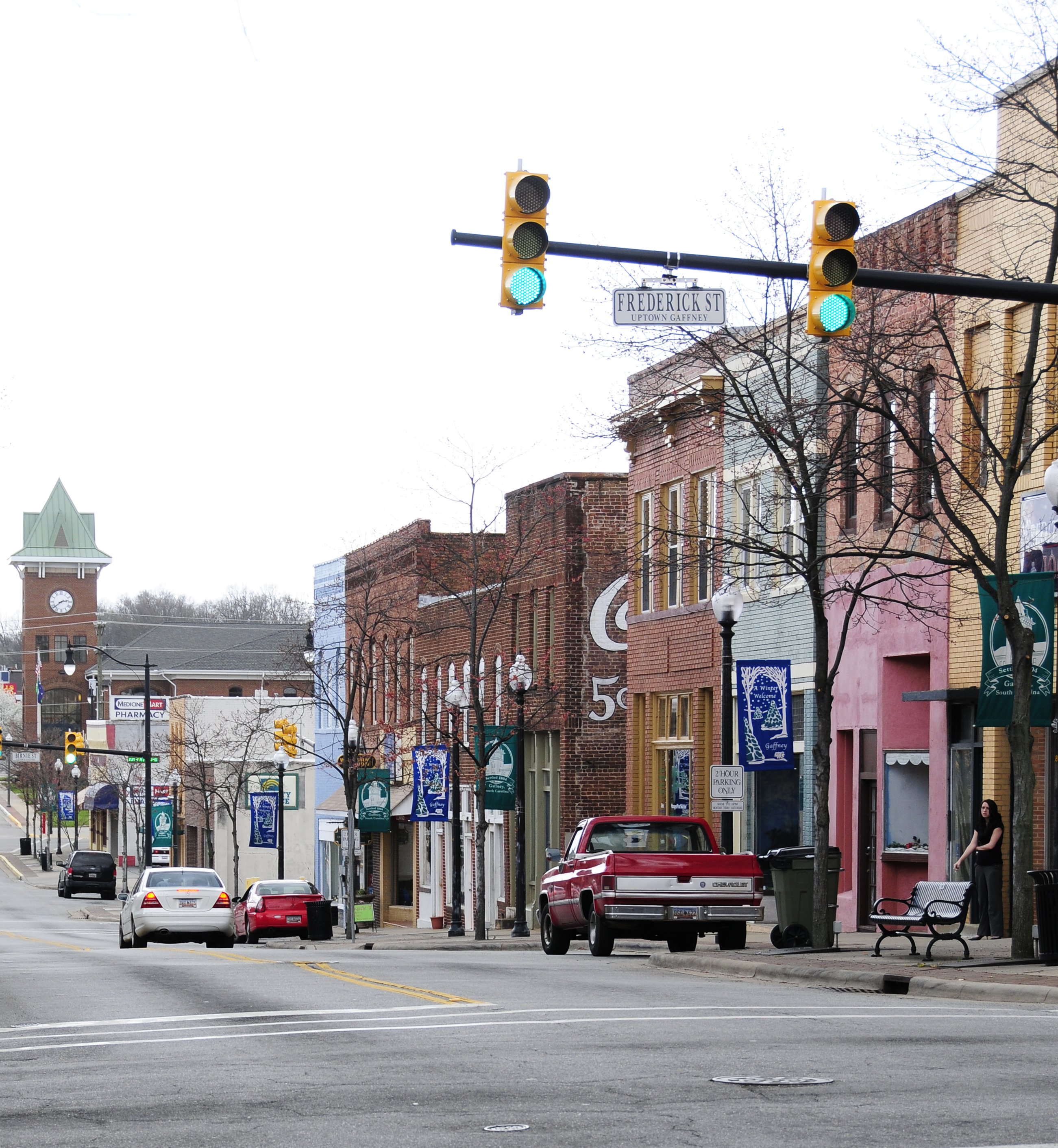
- Gaffney Commercial Historic District is listed on the National Register of Historic Places.

- Seal
- Nickname: "Peach Capital of South Carolina"
- Location within South Carolina
- Coordinates: 35°04′25″N 81°37′28″W
- Country: United States
- State: South Carolina
- County: Cherokee

Government
  - Mayor: Lyman Dawkins III

Area
  - Total: 8.71 sq mi (22.55 km^{2})
  - Land: 8.68 sq mi (22.49 km^{2})
  - Water: 0.023 sq mi (0.06 km^{2})
- Elevation: 738 ft (225 m)

Population (2020)
  - Total: 12,764
  - Density: 1,469.9/sq mi (567.55/km^{2})
- Time zone: UTC−5 (Eastern (EST))
  - Summer (DST): UTC−4 (EDT)
- ZIP codes: 29340-29342
- Area codes: 864, 821
- FIPS code: 45-28060
- GNIS feature ID: 2403674
- Website: www.cityofgaffney-sc.gov

Gaffney is a city in and the seat of Cherokee County, South Carolina, United States, in the Upstate region of South Carolina. Gaffney is known as the "Peach Capital of South Carolina". The population was 12,764 at the 2020 census. The city had an estimated population of 12,609 in 2019. It is the principal city of the Gaffney, South Carolina, Micropolitan Statistical Area, which includes all of Cherokee County and which is further included in the greater Greenville-Spartanburg-Anderson, South Carolina Combined Statistical Area. Gaffney was the home of Limestone University, which operated from 1845 until 2025.

== History ==
Michael Robert Gaffney was born in the town of Granard in County Longford, Ireland, in 1775. He emigrated to the United States in 1797, arriving in New York City and moving to Charleston, South Carolina, a few years later. Gaffney moved again in 1804 to the South Carolina Upcountry and established a tavern and lodging house at what became known as "Gaffney's Cross Roads". The location was perfect for growth because of the two major roads which met here, one from the mountains of North Carolina to Charleston and the other from Charlotte into Georgia. Michael Gaffney died here on September 6, 1854.

In 1872, the area became known as "Gaffney City". Gaffney became the county seat of Cherokee County which was formed out of parts of York, Union, and Spartanburg counties in 1897. Gaffney became a major center for the textile industry in South Carolina, which was the backbone of the county's economy up until the 1980s.

Uptown Gaffney began to languish after Interstate 85 was built in the county as industries located near the new highway.

Two serial killers have at different times attacked residents of Gaffney. In 1967–1968 Lee Roy Martin, known as the Gaffney Strangler, killed four people; two were young girls, a fourteen-year-old and a fifteen-year-old. In 2009, a series of shootings by Patrick Tracy Burris led to five deaths.

== Geography ==
Gaffney is located in northern South Carolina near the center of Cherokee County. It is located 55 miles (89 km) southwest of Charlotte, North Carolina and 50 miles (80 km) northeast of Greenville.

According to the United States Census Bureau, Gaffney has a total area of 8.35 square miles (21.63 km^{2}), of which 8.32 square miles (21.56 km^{2}) is land and 0.03 square miles (0.07 km^{2}), or 0.31%, is water.

== Demographics ==
Historical population
Census	Pop.	Note	%±
1880	400		—
1890	1,631		307.8%
1900	3,937		141.4%
1910	4,767		21.1%
1920	5,065		6.3%
1930	6,827		34.8%
1940	7,636		11.9%
1950	8,123		6.4%
1960	10,435		28.5%
1970	13,253		27.0%
1980	13,453		1.5%
1990	13,145		−2.3%
2000	12,968		−1.3%
2010	12,539		−3.3%
2020	12,764		1.8%
2025 (est.)	12,583	▼	−1.4%
U.S. Decennial Census

=== Racial and ethnic composition ===
Gaffney city, South Carolina – Racial and ethnic composition Note: the US Census treats Hispanic/Latino as an ethnic category. This table excludes Latinos from the racial categories and assigns them to a separate category. Hispanics/Latinos may be of any race.
Race / Ethnicity (NH = Non-Hispanic)	Pop 2000	Pop 2010	Pop 2020	% 2000	% 2010	% 2020
White alone (NH)	6,854	6,073	5,798	52.85%	48.92%	45.42%
Black or African American alone (NH)	5,703	5,639	5,763	43.98%	45.42%	45.15%
Native American or Alaska Native alone (NH)	16	30	37	0.12%	0.24%	0.29%
Asian alone (NH)	58	108	81	0.45%	0.87%	0.63%
Native Hawaiian or Pacific Islander alone (NH)	2	3	8	0.02%	0.02%	0.06%
Other race alone (NH)	3	9	78	0.02%	0.07%	0.61%
Mixed race or Multiracial (NH)	75	171	380	0.58%	1.38%	2.98%
Hispanic or Latino (any race)	257	381	619	1.98%	3.07%	4.85%
Total	12,968	12,414	12,764	100.00%	100.00%	100.00%

=== 2020 census ===
As of the 2020 census, Gaffney had a population of 12,764. The median age was 38.1 years, with 21.0% of residents under the age of 18 and 18.7% 65 years of age or older; for every 100 females there were 91.3 males, and for every 100 females age 18 and over there were 88.4 males age 18 and over.

100.0% of residents lived in urban areas, while 0.0% lived in rural areas.

There were 5,153 households in Gaffney, of which 27.6% had children under the age of 18 living in them. Of all households, 27.4% were married-couple households, 23.3% were households with a male householder and no spouse or partner present, and 42.4% were households with a female householder and no spouse or partner present. About 38.1% of all households were made up of individuals and 15.7% had someone living alone who was 65 years of age or older.

There were 5,904 housing units, of which 12.7% were vacant. The homeowner vacancy rate was 2.4% and the rental vacancy rate was 10.4%.

Racial composition as of the 2020 census
Race	Number	Percent
White	5,921	46.4%
Black or African American	5,795	45.4%
American Indian and Alaska Native	47	0.4%
Asian	83	0.7%
Native Hawaiian and Other Pacific Islander	8	0.1%
Some other race	394	3.1%
Two or more races	516	4.0%

=== 2000 census ===
As of the census of 2000, there were 12,968 people, 5,304 households, and 3,336 families residing in the city. The population density was 1,649.7 inhabitants per square mile (637.0/km^{2}). There were 5,765 housing units at an average density of 733.4 per square mile (283.2/km^{2}). The racial makeup of the city was 50.48% White, 47.19% African American, 0.15% Native American, 0.45% Asian, 0.03% Pacific Islander, 0.99% from other races, and 0.71% from two or more races. Hispanic or Latino of any race were 1.98% of the population.

There were 5,304 households, out of which 26.8% had children under the age of 18 living with them, 37.1% were married couples living together, 21.6% had a female householder with no husband present, and 37.1% were non-families. 33.3% of all households were made up of individuals, and 14.2% had someone living alone who was 65 years of age or older. The average household size was 2.32 and the average family size was 2.96.

In the city, the population was spread out, with 23.4% under the age of 18, 10.8% from 18 to 24, 25.7% from 25 to 44, 22.6% from 45 to 64, and 17.5% who were 65 years of age or older. The median age was 38 years. For every 100 females, there were 82.1 males. For every 100 females age 18 and over, there were 78.7 males.

The median income for a household in the city was $29,480, and the median income for a family was $38,449. Males had a median income of $30,145 versus $22,167 for females. The per capita income for the city was $17,755. About 13.3% of families and 26.2% of the population were below the poverty line, including 19.2% of those under age 18 and 18.0% of those age 65 or over.

== Arts and culture ==
Gaffney has a public library, a branch of the Cherokee County Library System.

Located in the historic district of downtown Gaffney, is Harold's Restaurant, a diner founded in 1932 by Harold Tindall. The diner was featured on Food Network's Diners, Drive-ins, and Dives and visited by host Guy Fieri in 2007.

In 2008, the Cherokee County History and Arts Museum opened on the former mustering ground of the South Carolina militia (1812–1914), and is one of the city's three nationally registered historic sites.

Other historic sites listed in the National Register of Historic Places include Archeological Site 38CK1, Archeological Site 38CK44, Archeological Site 38CK45, Carnegie Free Library, Coopersville Ironworks Site (38CK2) and Susan Furnace Site (38CK67), Cowpens Furnace Site (38CK73), Winnie Davis Hall, Ellen Furnace Site (38CK68), Gaffney Commercial Historic District, Gaffney Residential Historic District, Irene Mill Finishing Plant, Jefferies House, Limestone Springs Historic District, Magness-Humphries House, Nesbitt's Limestone Quarry (38CK69), and Settlemyer House.

== Parks and recreation ==
The city's park system include a skatepark, two passive parks, and several children's playgrounds. The city also has a dirt track called Cherokee Speedway.

== Education ==
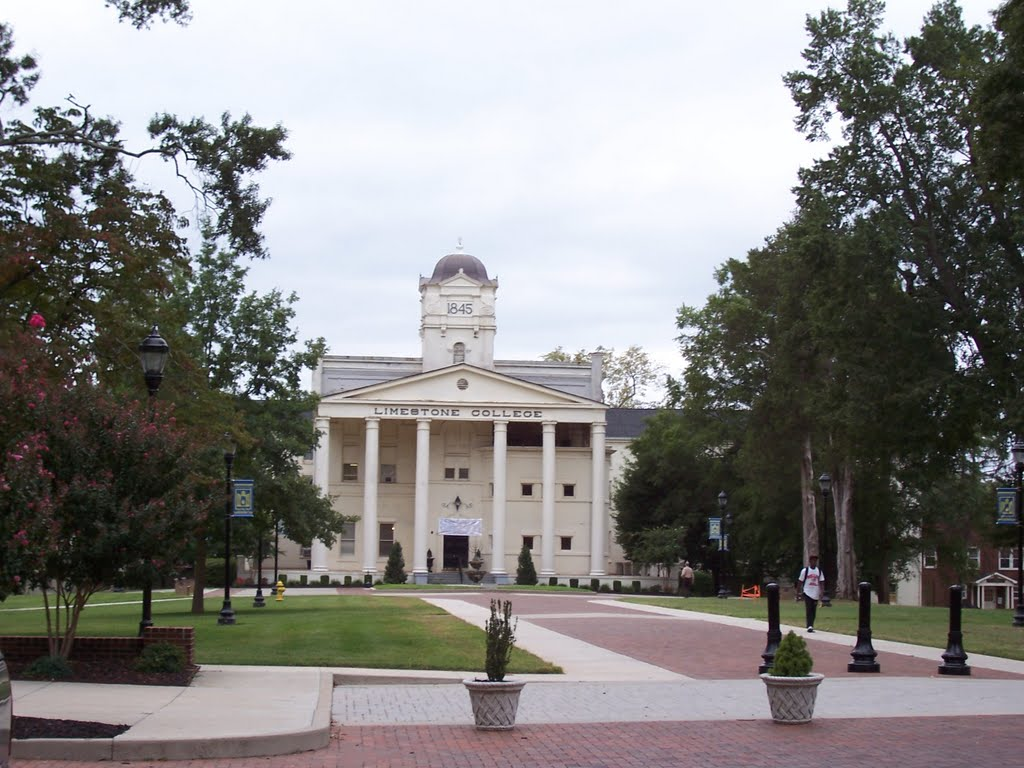
Limestone University

Gaffney is served by the Cherokee County School District, which is one unified school district. Public schools in Gaffney include:

- Gaffney High School
- Ewing Middle School
- Gaffney Middle School
- B D Lee Elementary School
- Limestone Central Elementary School
- Luther Vaughan Elementary School
- Mary Bramlett Elementary School

Private schools in Gaffney include:

- Village School of Gaffney
- Gaffney Christian Academy

Colleges & universities:

- Limestone University
- Spartanburg Community College - Cherokee County Campus, including a training building and Freightliner facility

== Media ==
- The Gaffney Ledger, the county's oldest local newspaper, published on Mondays, Wednesdays and Fridays
- The Cherokee Chronicle, local newspaper published on Tuesdays and Thursdays
- Spartanburg Herald-Journal, area newspaper
- WZZQ 104.3 FM and 1500 AM, local news, country music, local high school and college sports
- WFGN 1180 AM, gospel music
- WYFG 91.1 FM, Christian
- The Just Jesus Radio Network (online local religious programming)

== Infrastructure ==
Peachoid water tower

=== Transportation ===
Gaffney is located on the Interstate 85 corridor, linking it to Atlanta and Charlotte. U.S. Route 29 passes through the center of Gaffney.

Public transit is available through the Gaffney Cab Company.

The region is served by two airports, Greenville–Spartanburg International Airport, and Charlotte Douglas International Airport.

=== Water tower ===
The Peachoid water tower is a water tower shaped like a peach, and serves both artistic and practical functions.

=== Healthcare ===
- Cherokee Medical Center is a 125-bed acute care facility in Gaffney. The hospital provides emergency, medical, surgical and imaging.
- Gibbs Cancer Center and Research Institute at Gaffney opened in 2011 and provides cancer care.
- Immediate Care Center provides urgent and primary care.

== Notable people ==
- Charlie Blackwell-Thompson, NASA SLS/Orion Launch Director at Kennedy Space Center
- Charlie Blanton, NASCAR driver.
- W. J. Cash, author.
- Neil Chambers, author, designer
- Kertus Davis, NASCAR driver.
- Rico Dowdle, professional football player for the Pittsburgh Steelers.
- Elizabeth Eslami, author.
- Robert E. Hall, eleventh Sergeant Major of the Army.
- Andie MacDowell, actress.
- Michael McCluney, member of the band Day26
- Rocky McIntosh, professional football player.
- Sara McMann, mixed martial artist.
- Mikki Moore, professional basketball player.
- Gaylord Perry, Hall of Fame pitcher and two time winner of the Cy Young Award.
- Arizona Reid, Israeli National League basketball player.
- Sidney Rice, professional football player.
- Dominique Stevenson, professional football player.

== In popular culture ==
Fictional politician Frank Underwood, the protagonist of the Netflix series House of Cards, is a native of the city and its congressman in the U.S. House of Representatives (for South Carolina's 5th congressional district) and later President of the United States. The Peachoid was shown, and referred to in multiple episodes.

== See also ==
- List of cities and towns in South Carolina
