= Rakhanch =

Ruler in Ancient Asia

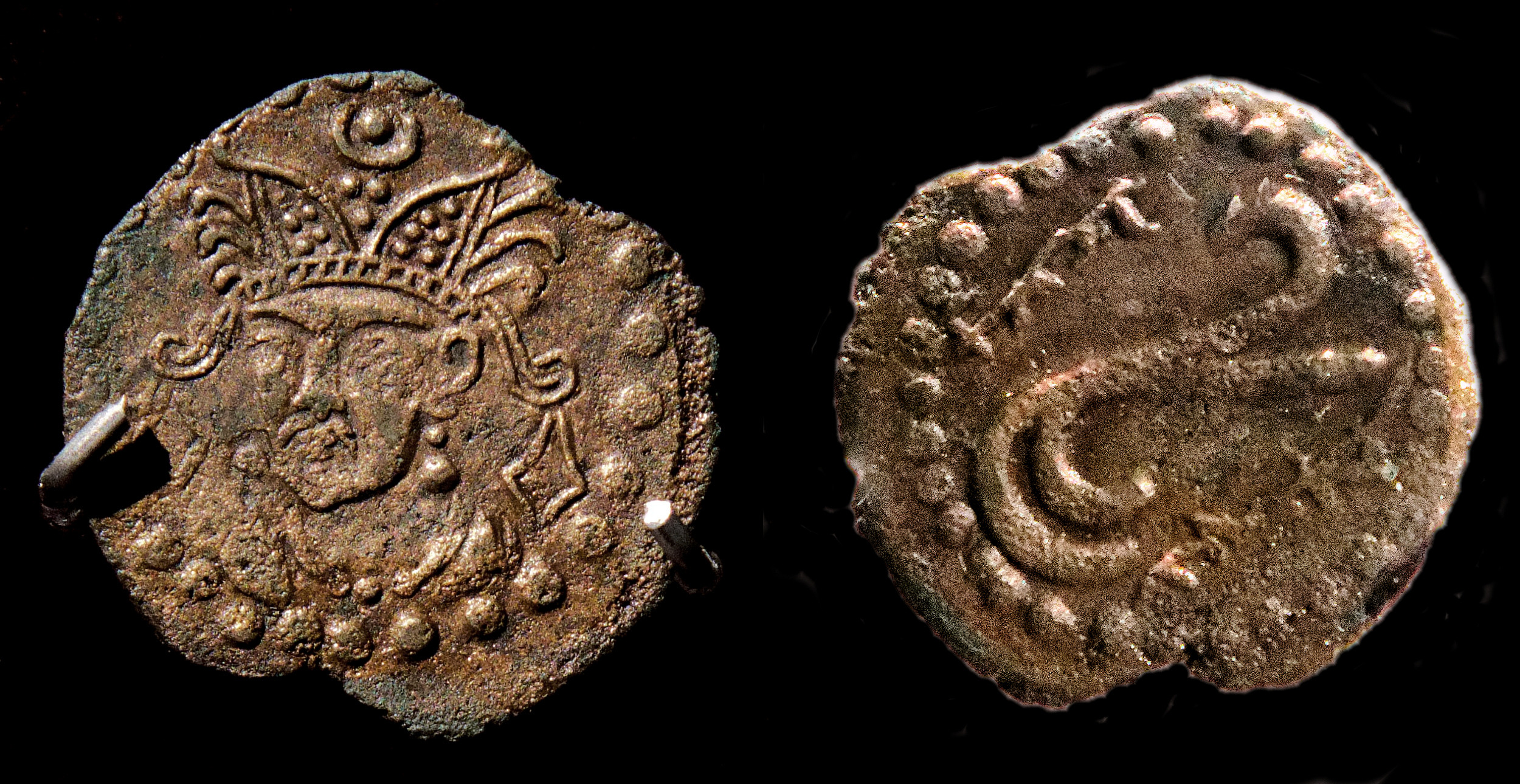
Coin in the name of Rakhanch, Sogdian lord of the Principality of Ushrusana, tamgha symbol on the reverse with name. Excavated in the Palace of Kala-i Kakhkakha I, Bunjikat. 7th century CE, National Museum of Antiquities of Tajikistan (RTL 213).

Location of the Principality of Ushrusana.

Rakhanch was a Sogdian Afshin (ruler) of the Principality of Ushrusana, modern Tajikistan, in the 7th century CE, in the period between 600 and 720 CE.

Some of his coins, discovered in the ruins of the Palace of Kala-i Kakhkakha I in Bunjikat, are now in the National Museum of Antiquities of Tajikistan. Some of his coins, in some cases bearing the symbol of a Christian equilateral cross, were also found in the area of Chach, together with another ruler named Satachari.

His rule takes place in the period between the fall of the Kushan Empire in the 4th century, and the Muslim conquest of Transoxiana in the 8th century, when Sogdian culture expanded in Central Asia.

Rakhanch was a member of the First Dynasty of rulers of Ustrushana, which ruled from 600 to 720 CE. Its ruler were in order: Chirdmish, Satachari I, Rakhanch I, Satachari II, Satachari III, Rakhanch II, Rahanch III.

A Second dynasty ruled between 720 and 894 CE, until the Principality was overtaken by the Samanid Empire: Kharabugra (720-738), Hanahara (738-800), Cavus (800-825), Haydar (al-Afshin) (825-840), Hassan (840-860), Abdallah (860-880), Sayr (880-893/894).

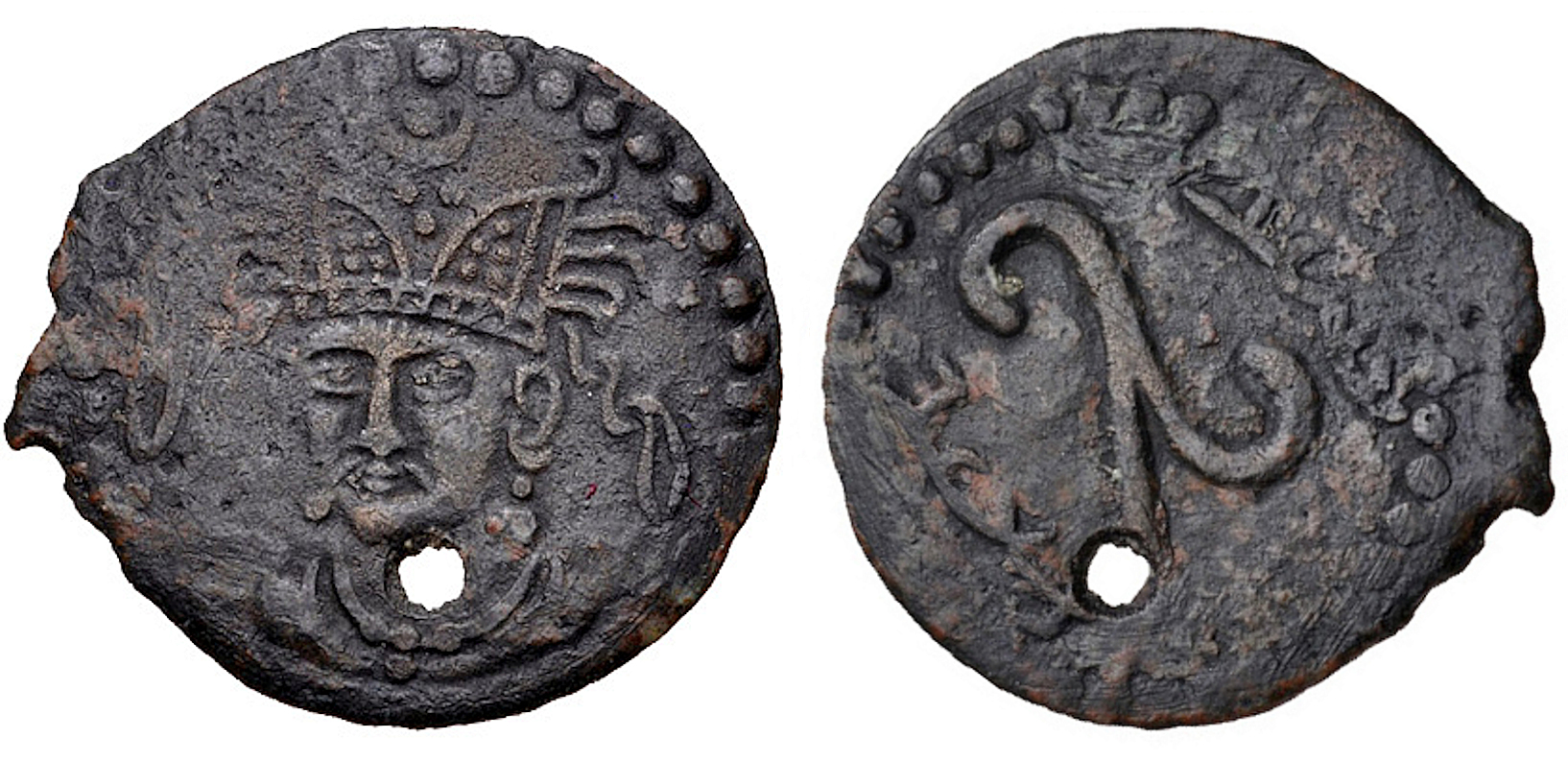
Another coin of Rakhanch, Ustrushana, circa 600-725 CE. It was holed for suspension.
