= Principality of Ushrusana =

Asian state

- circa 600–892/3
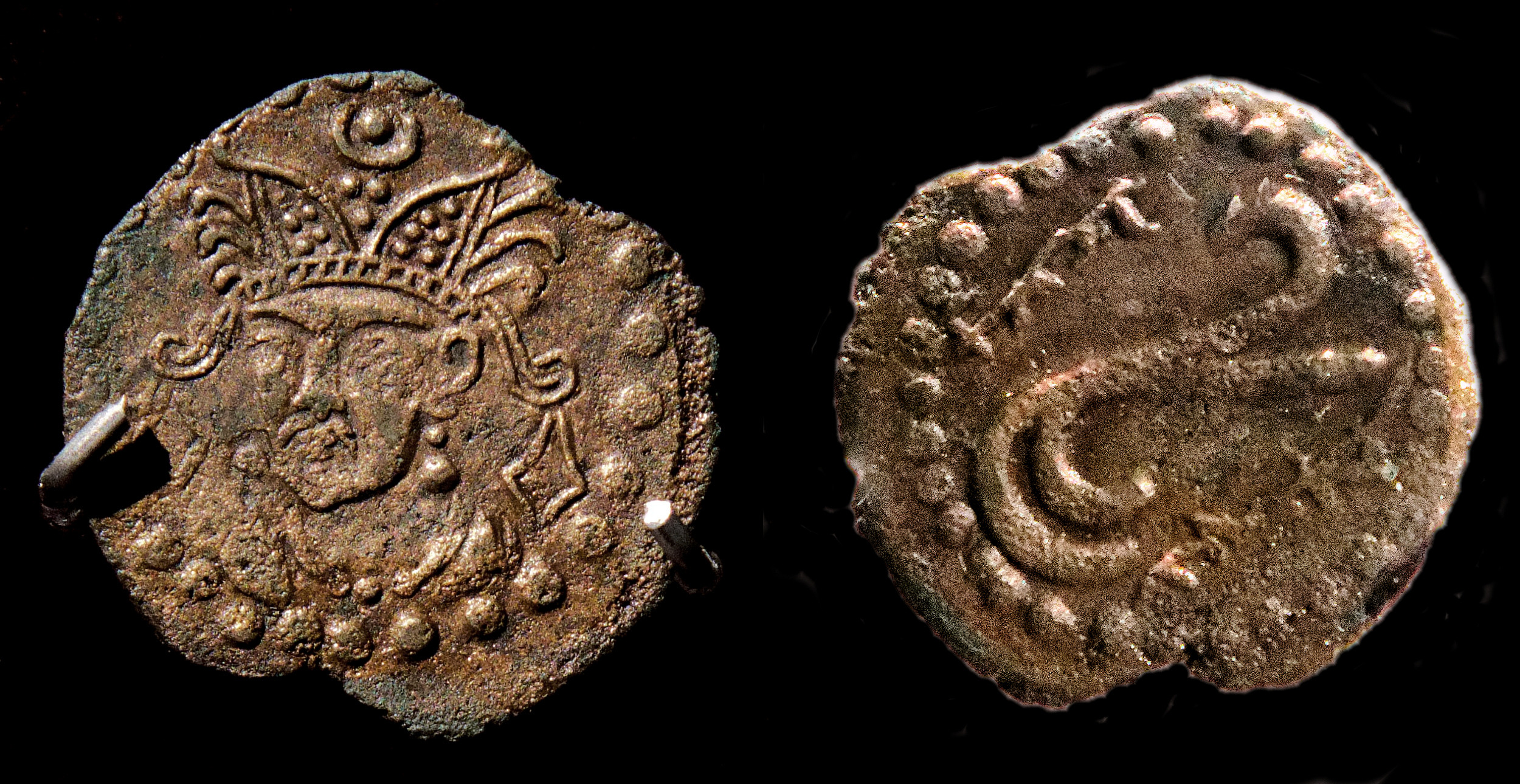
- Coin in the name of Rakhanch, lord of Ushrusana. Tamgha symbol on the reverse with name of the ruler in Sogdian rγʾnč MRAY "Raxānič Afšīn". Excavated in the Palace of Kala-i Kakhkakha I, Bunjikat. 7th century CE, National Museum of Antiquities of Tajikistan (RTL 213).

- Location of the Afshins of Ushruna, and neighbouring polities.
- Capital: Bunjikath
- Common languages: Sogdian; Persian
- Religion: Zoroastrianism (???-822); Sunni Islam (822-892)
- Government: Monarchy
- Afshin
- Historical era: Middle Ages
  - Established: circa 600
  - Samanid conquest: 892/3
| Preceded by | Succeeded by |
| Hephthalite Empire; Western Turkic Khaganate | Samanid Empire |

The Principality of Ushrusana (also spelled Usrushana, Osrushana or Ustrushana) was a local dynasty ruling the Ushrusana region, in the northern area of modern Tajikistan, from an unknown date to 892 CE. Ushrusana, just like Ferghana, did not belong to Sogdia proper, but its inhabitants wrote in Sogdian, and may have spoken the Sogdian language as well. The rulers of the principality were known by their title of Afshin.

== History ==
Ushrusana may have been associated with remnants of the Kidarites in Eastern Sogdiana. The Kidarites, who are otherwise known for their rule in Gandhara in the 4-5th century CE, may have survived and possibly established a Kidarite kingdom in Usrushana. This connection may be apparent from the analysis of the coinage, and in the names of some Ushrusana rulers such as Khaydhar ibn Kawus al-Afshin, whose personal name is attested as "Khydhar", and was sometimes written wrongly as "Haydar" in Arabic. In effect, the name "Kydr" was quite popular in Usrushana, and is attested in many contemporary sources. The title Afshin used by the rulers of Usrushana is also attested in a Kidarite ruler of Samarkand of the 5th century named Ularg, who bore the similar title "Afshiyan" (Bactrian script: αφϸιιανο).

From the 5th to the 7th century CE, Ushrusana was part of the territory of the Hephthalites, followed by the Western Turks after 560 CE.

=== First Dynasty (600-720 CE) ===
After 600 CE, a first dynasty of rulers of Ushrusana is known, which ruled independently from 600 to 720 CE until the last phases of the Muslim conquest of Transoxiana. Its rulers were in order: Chirdmish, Satachari I, Rakhanch I, Satachari II, Satachari III, Rakhanch II, Rahanch III. They are especially known from their coinage.

Ushrusana functioned as a frontier province in Central Asia, bordering the lands of Islam during the Umayyad and early Abbasid caliphates. It was situated between the districts of Samarkand in the west and Khujand to the east, and was somewhat south of the Syr Darya River. As a result of its location, several roads ran through it, making the province a frequent stop for travelers. The terrain of the country consisted of a mixture of plains and mountains; some districts of Ushrusana had towns, but overall the region was little urbanized. The primary city was Bunjikat, which was often referred to as the City of Ushrusana, where numerous archaeological and artistic remains are being found.

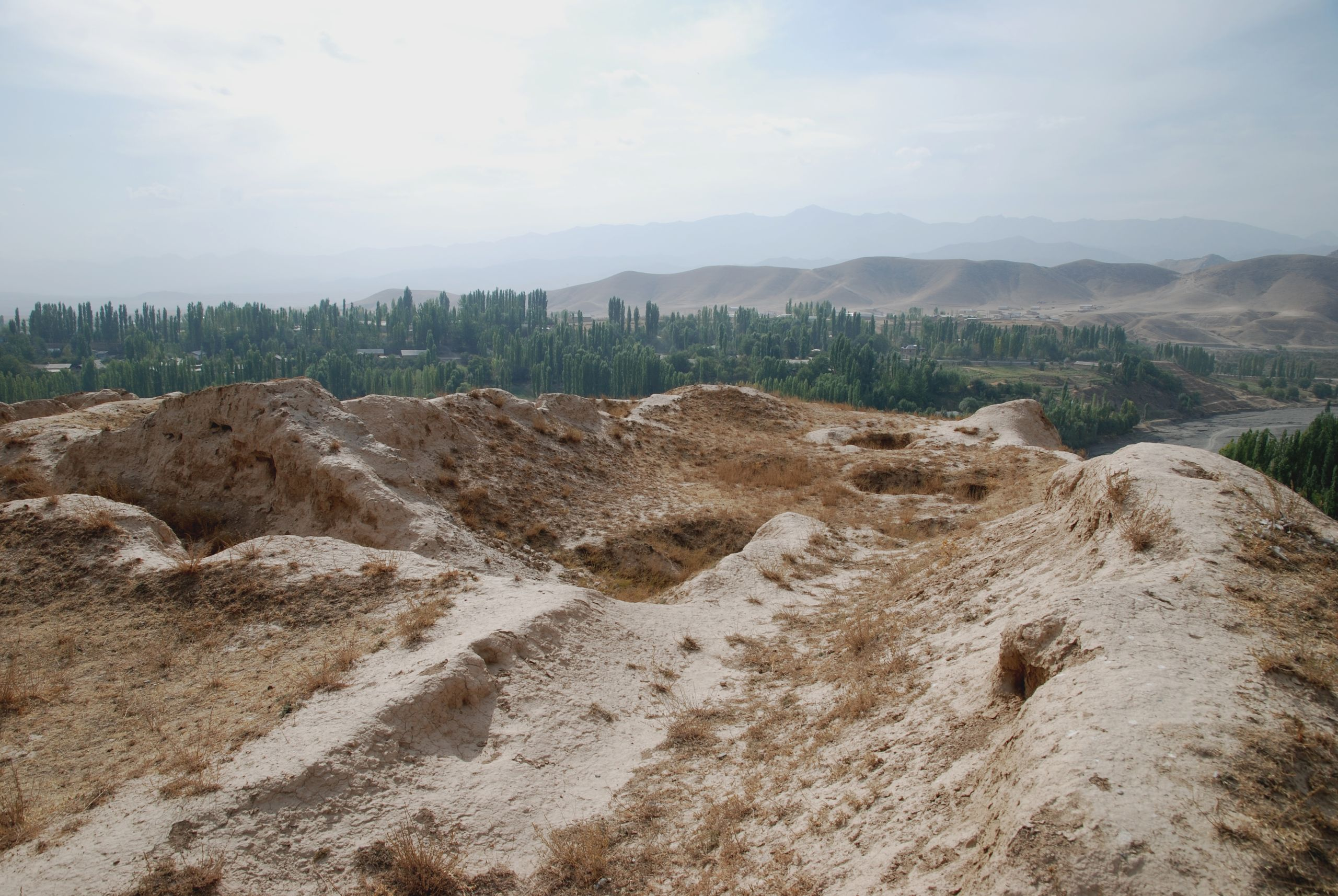
Ruins of the Palace of Kalai Kahkaha 1, Bunjikat, capital of Ushrusana

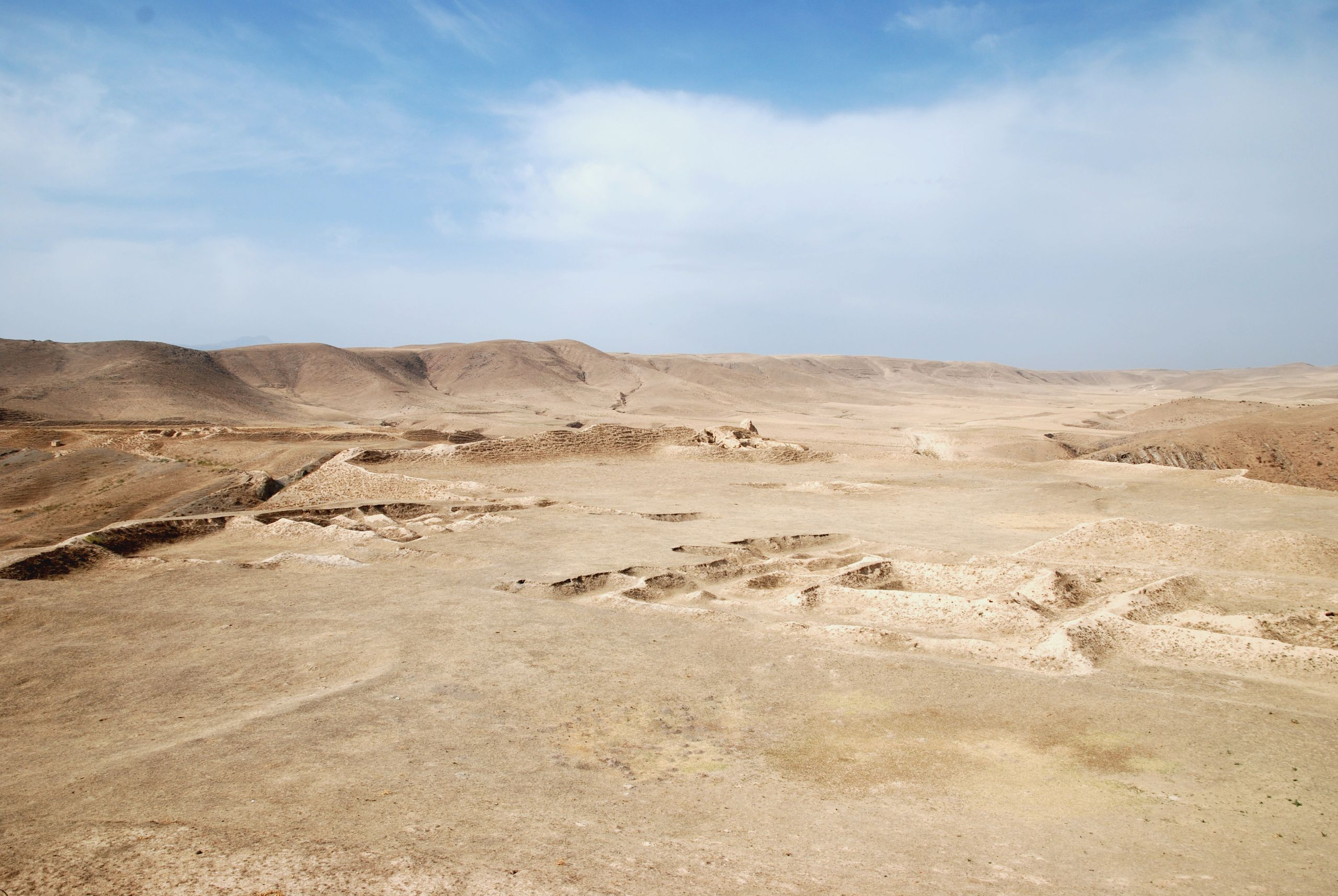
Ruins of the Palace of Kalai Kahkaha 1, toward the west

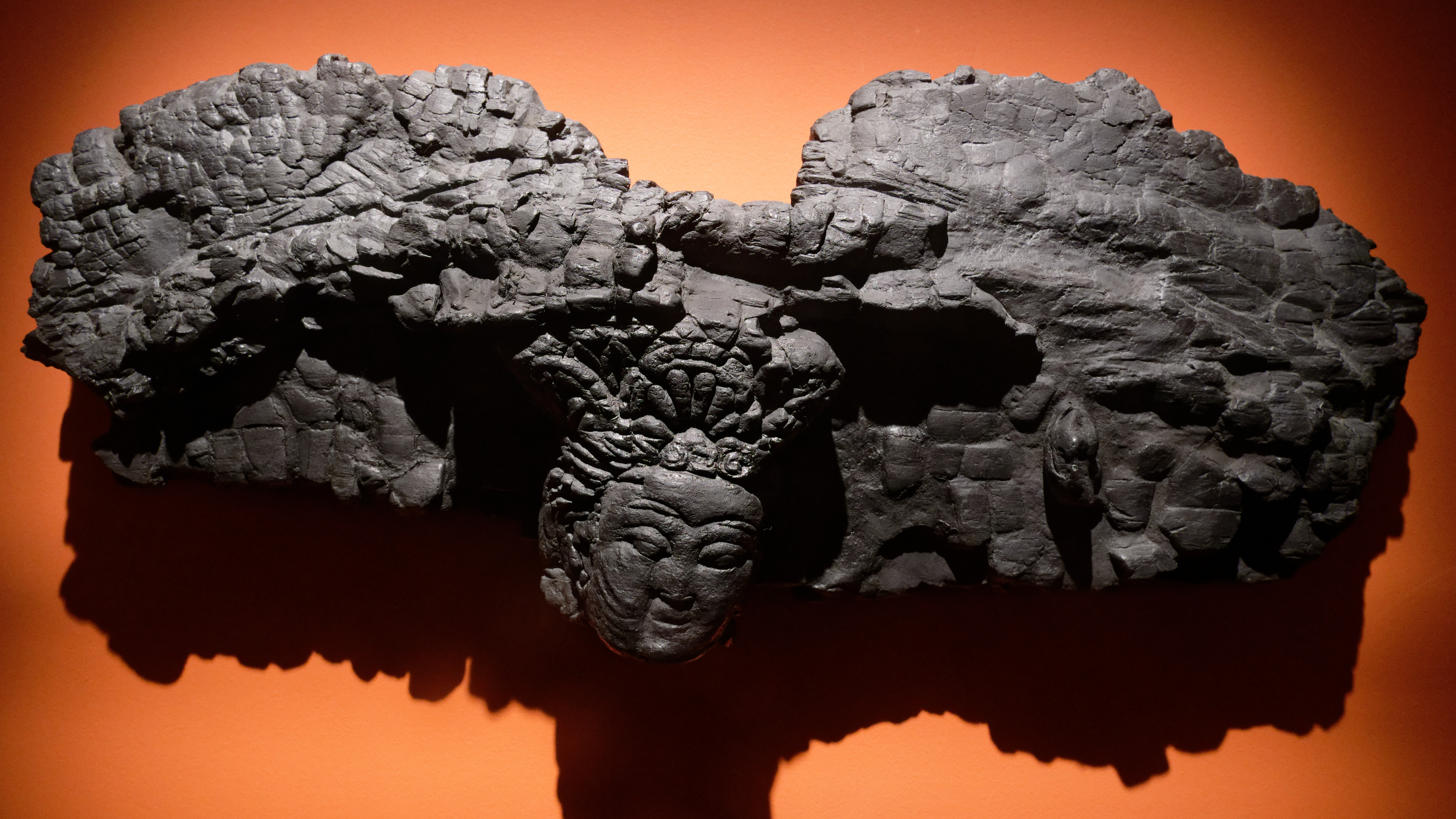
Burnt wooden head of a goddess, late 8th century. From the palace of Kala-i Kakhkakha, Tajikistan.

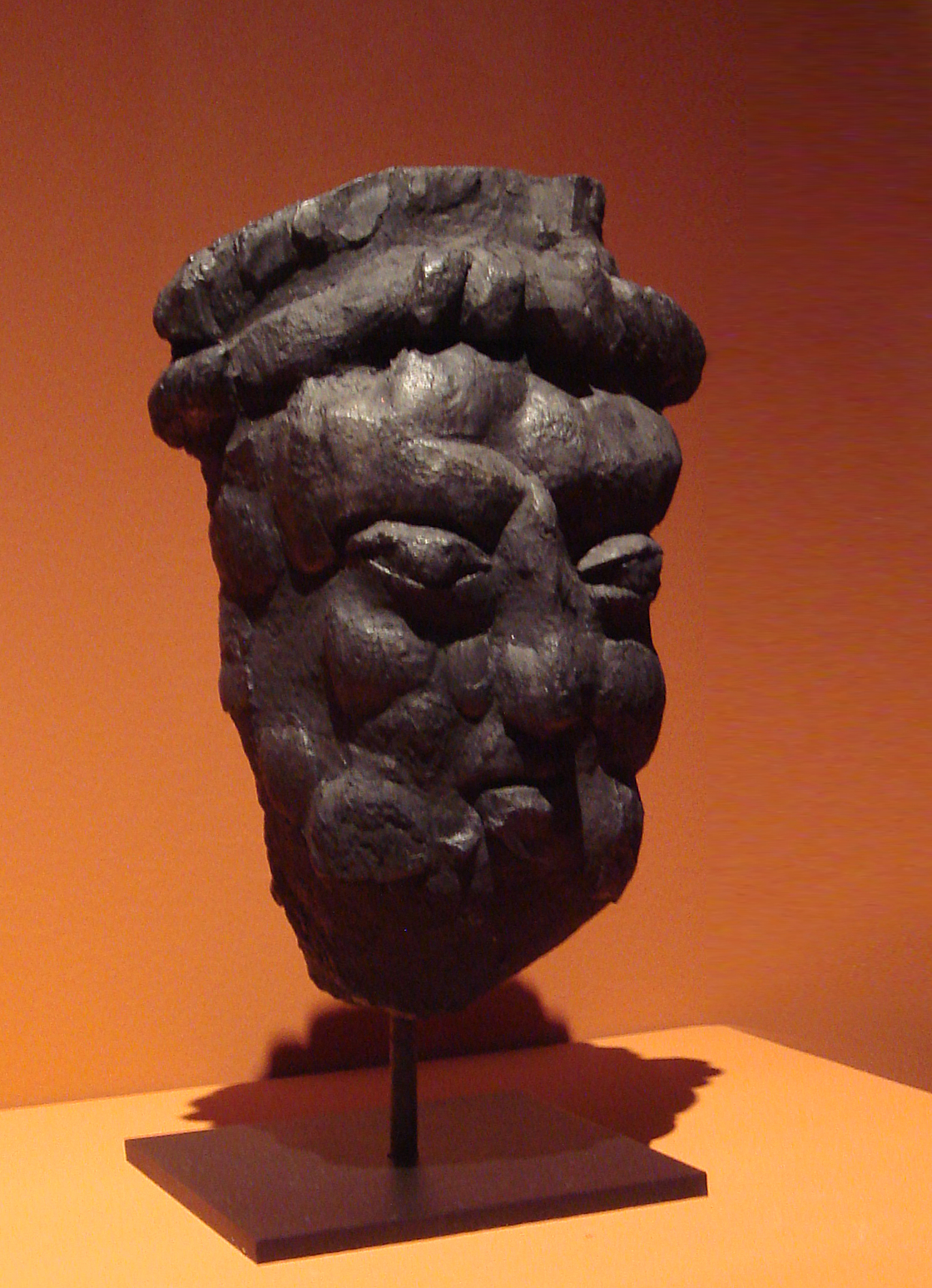
Burnt wooden statue, Kala-i Kakhkakha, Chilkhujra castle, 6-7th century, National Museum of Antiquities of Tajikistan

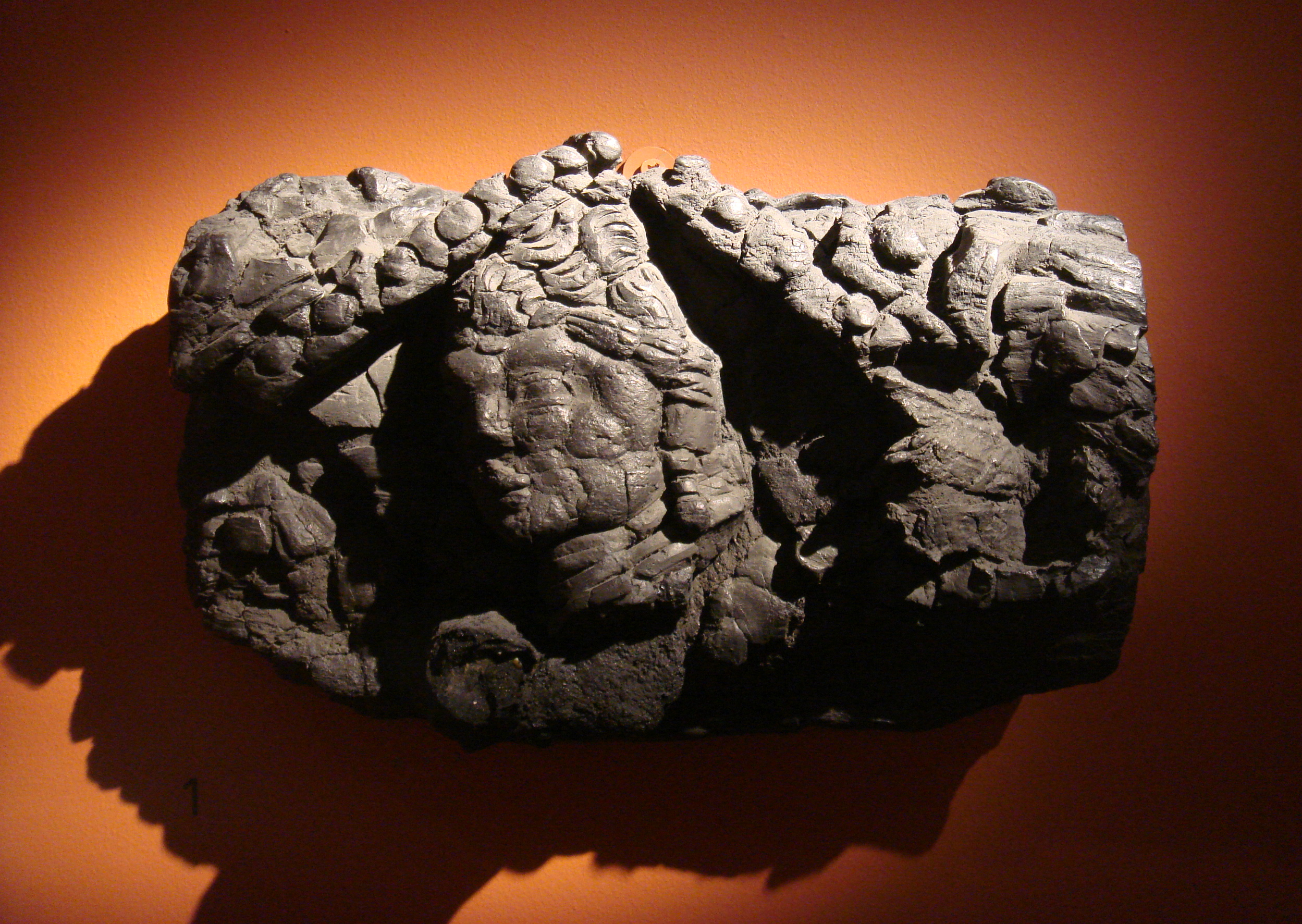
Burnt wooden head of a woman, Kala-i Kakhkakha I palace, 7-8th century, National Museum of Antiquities of Tajikistan

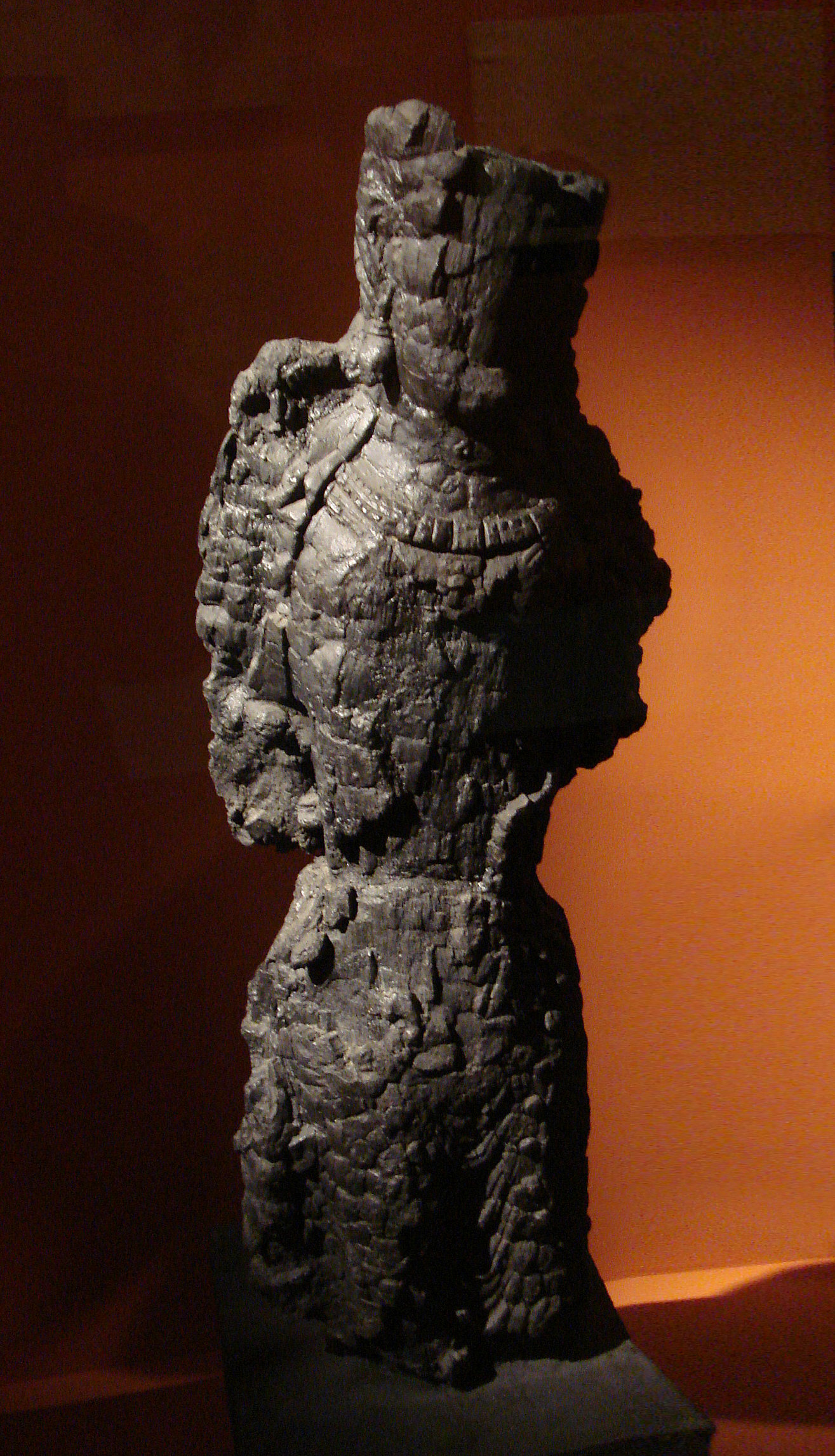
Burnt wooden statue of a Prince, Kala-i Kakhkakha I palace, 7-8th century, National Museum of Antiquities of Tajikistan

=== Second Dynasty (720-893 CE) ===
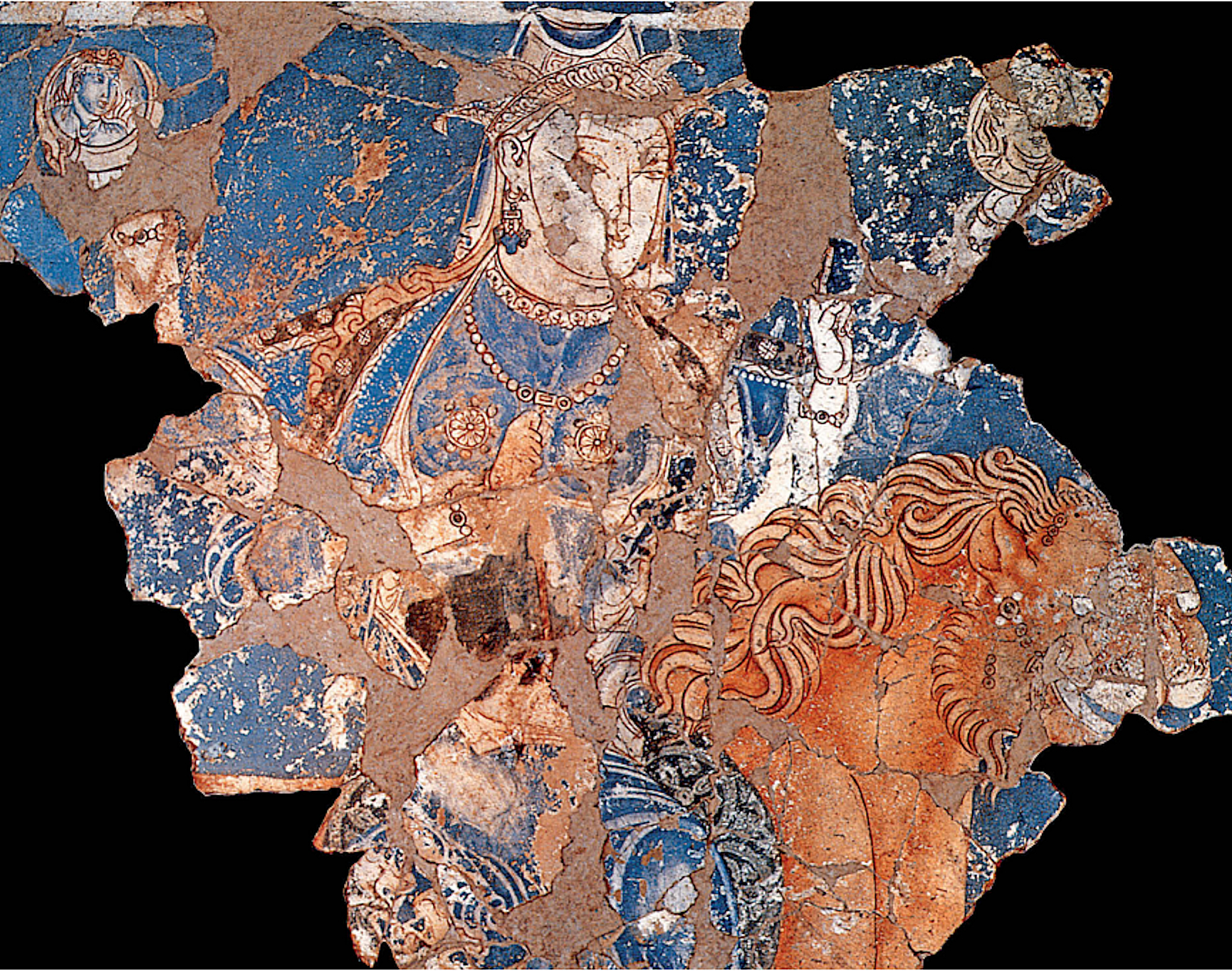
Wall painting of goddess Nana, Bunjikat, 8th-9th century CE.

Ushrusana is mentioned by Arab sources during the Muslim conquest of Transoxiana, and was at times nominally subject to the Caliphate, but it remained effectively independent. The Principality probably retained a certain level of autonomy throughout this period, and was ruled directly by the afshins of the Kavus dynasty. A Second dynasty is known from this period, which ruled between 720 and 894 CE, until the Principality was overtaken by the Samanid Empire: Kharabugra (720-738), Hanahara (738-800), Cavus (800-825), Haydar (al-Afshin) (825-840), Hassan (840-860), Abdallah (860-880), Sayr (880-893/894).

Several Umayyad governors conducted raids into the country and received tribute from its rulers, but permanent conquest was not achieved by them. After the Abbasids came to power in 750, the princes of Ushrusana made submissions to the caliphs during the reigns of al-Mahdi (r. 775–785) and Harun al-Rashid (r. 786–809), but these appear to have been nominal acts and the people of the region continued to resist Muslim rule. The Muslim historian Ya'qubi (died 897/8) in his Ta'rikh ("History"), recounts that the third Abbasid Caliph Al-Mahdi (ruled 775-785 CE) asked for, and apparently obtained, the submission of various Central Asian rulers, including that of the Afshīn of Usrushana. The original account by Ya'qubi reads:

Al-Mahdī sent messengers to the kings, calling on them to submit, and most of them submitted to him. Among them were the king of Kābul Shāh, whose name was Ḥanḥal; the king of Ṭabaristān, the Iṣbahbadh; the king of Soghdia, the Ikhshīd; the king of Tukhāristān, Sharwin; the king of Bamiyan, the Shīr; the king of Farghana, ------ ; the king of Usrūshana, Afshīn; the king of the Kharlukhiyya, Jabghūya; the king of Sijistān, Zunbīl; the king of Turks, Tarkhan; the king of Tibet, Ḥ-h-w-r-n; the king of Sind, al-Rāy; the king of China, Baghbür; the king of India and Atrāḥ, Wahūfūr; and the king of the Tughuz-ghuz, Khāqān.

— Ya'qubi (died 897/8), Ta'rikh ("History")

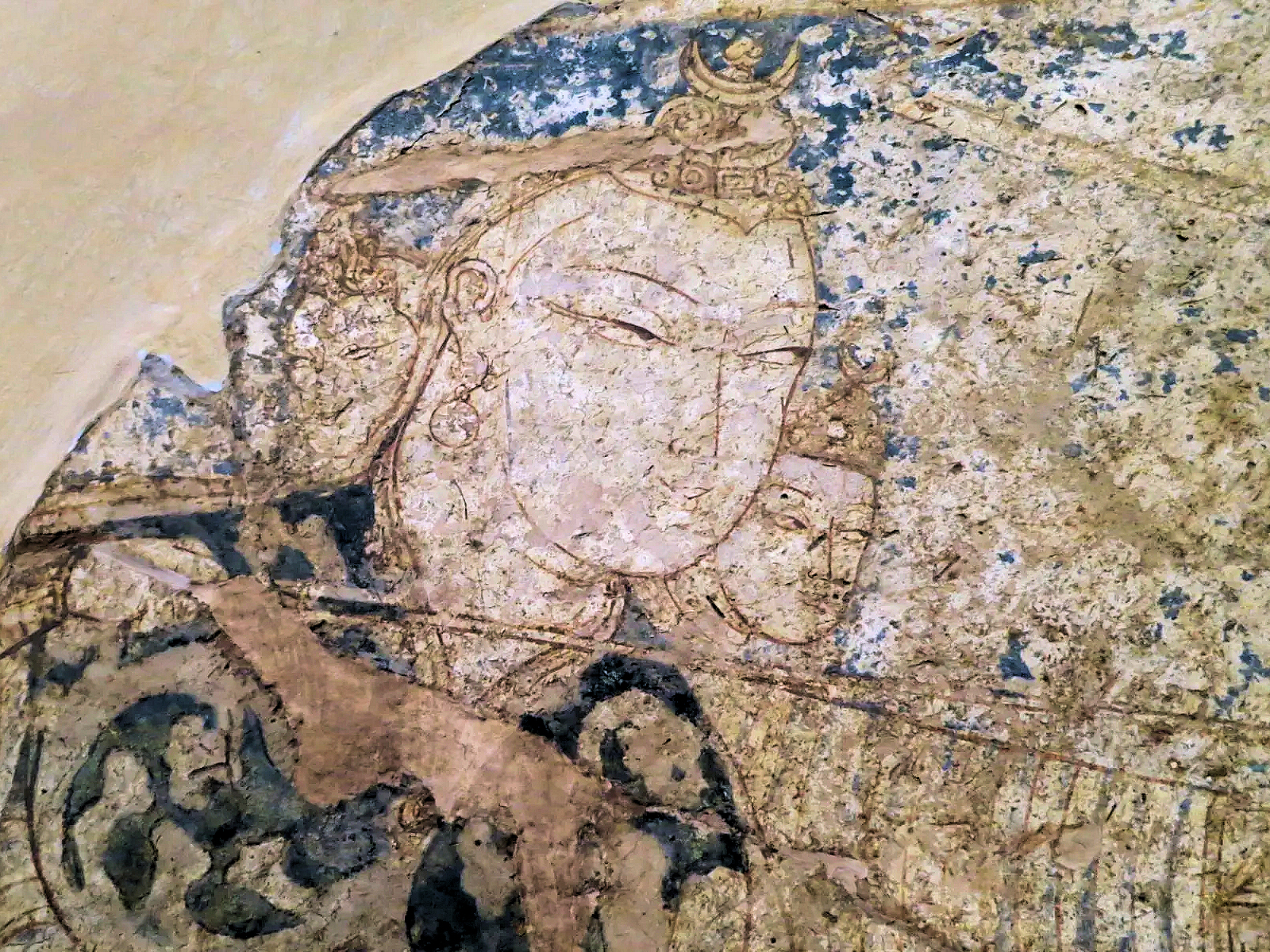
Painting of the God Weshparkar with bow, Kala-i Kakhkakha I, Bunjikat, Ustrushana, 8-9th century CE, National Museum of Antiquities of Tajikistan.

Ushrusana was more firmly brought under Abbasid control following a quarrel that broke out within the ruling dynasty, during the caliphate of al-Ma'mun (r. 813–833). In 822, a Muslim army under Ahmad ibn Abi Khalid al-Ahwal conquered Ushrusana and captured its ruler Kawus ibn Kharakhuruh; he was sent to Baghdad, where he submitted to the caliph and converted to Islam. From this point on, Ushrusana was generally considered to be part of the Abbasid state, although the afshins were allowed to retain their control over the country as subjects of the caliph.

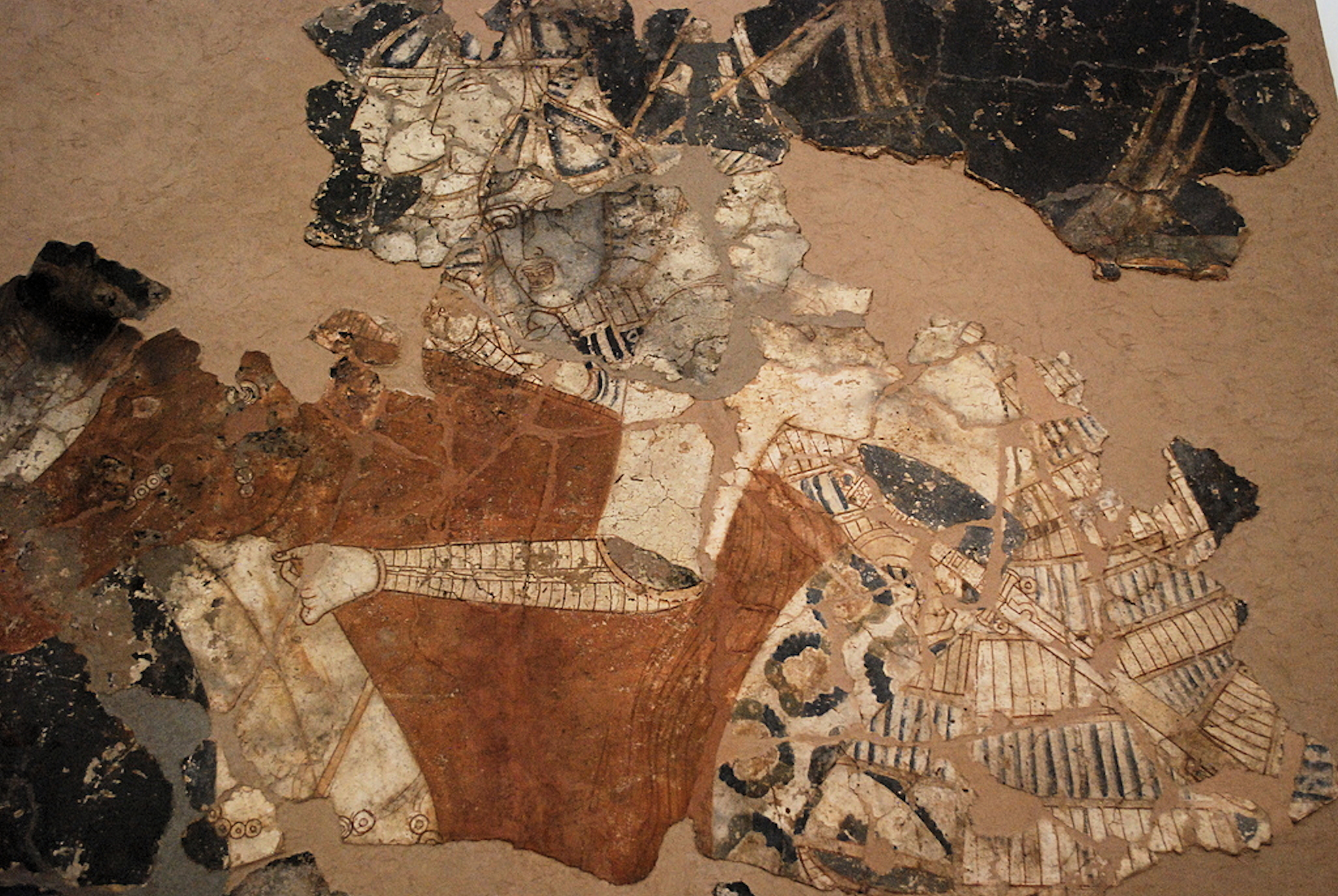
Cavalry battle scene: an armoured knight wounded by two arrows holds the neck of his horse. Palace of Kalai Kahkaha 1, Bunjikat. 8th-9th century CE. National Museum of Antiquities of Tajikistan (RTL 217).

Kawus was succeeded by his son Khaydar, who had assisted Ahmad ibn Abi Khalid in his campaign against Ushrusana. Khaydar, who is usually referred to in the sources simply as al-Afshin, decided to enter the service of the Abbasids and made his way to al-Ma'mun's court. There he embarked on a military career, and became a commander in the caliphal army. With Afshin came a number of his followers, a number of whom were fellow natives of Ushrusana. These men were integrated into the army and, serving under their prince, became known as the Ushrusaniyya. However, Afshin later tried to gain control over all of Khurasan and Transoxiana from the Persian Tahirid dynasty. He even secretly supported Mazyar, the Karenid ruler of Tabaristan, who had rebelled against the Abbasids. The rebellion, however, was soon suppressed, and Afshin's ambitions were revealed by the Abbasids.

Furthermore, Afshin was accused of being a Zoroastrian, and he was soon imprisoned and died. His successor is not known; however, the Afshin family continued to rule Ushrusana until 892, when the Samanid ruler Isma'il ibn Ahmad incorporated Ushrusana into his Empire and killed its ruler, Sayyar ibn 'Abdallah.

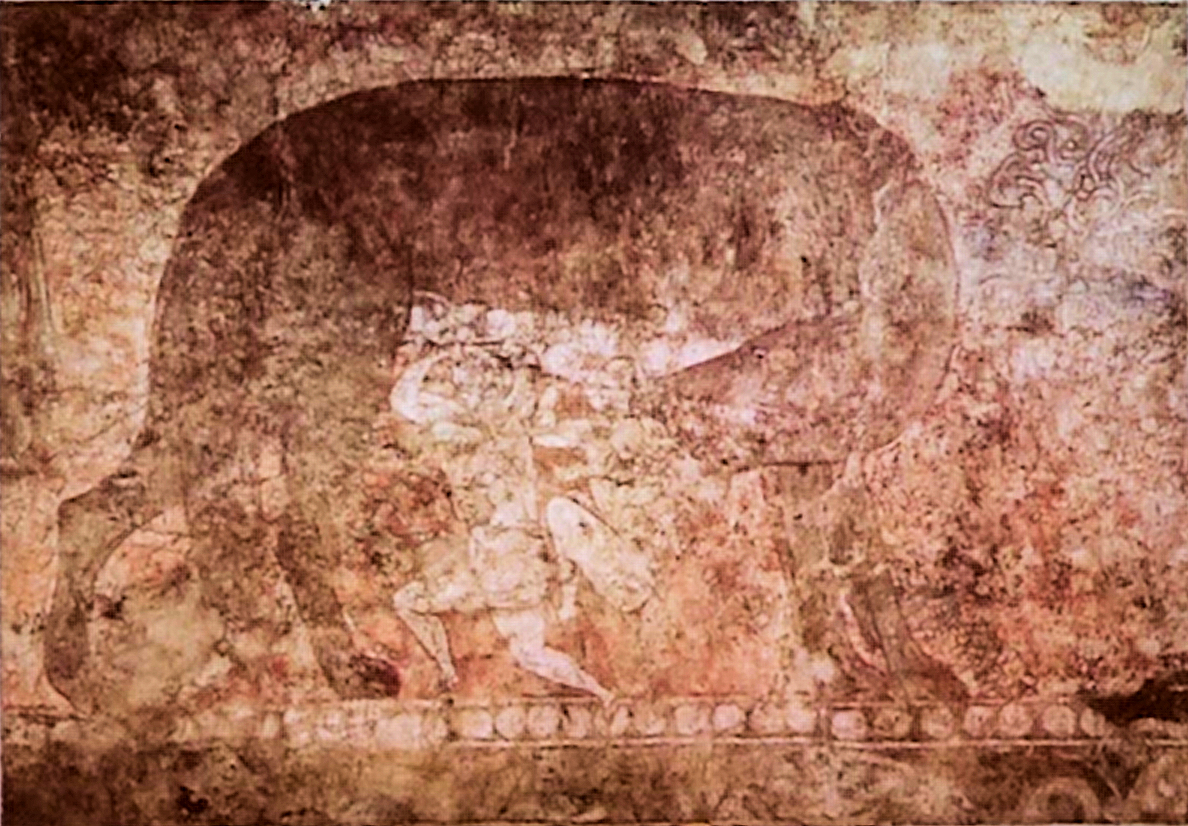
Bunjikat "Remus and Romulus", 8th century.

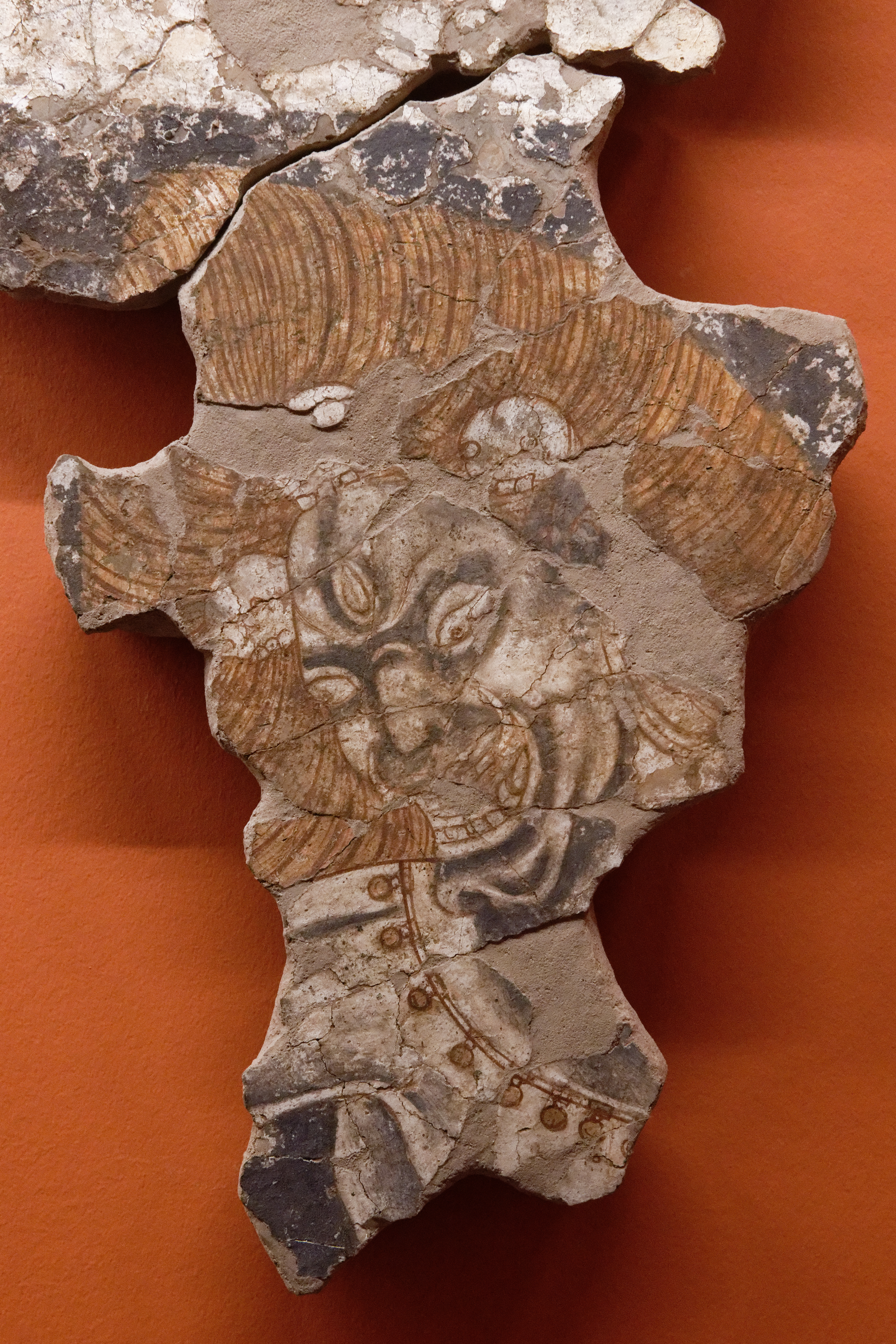
Demon with three eyes and skulls in his hair. Kala-i Kakhkakha I, Bunjikat, 8-9th century, National Museum of Antiquities of Tajikistan, RTL 253

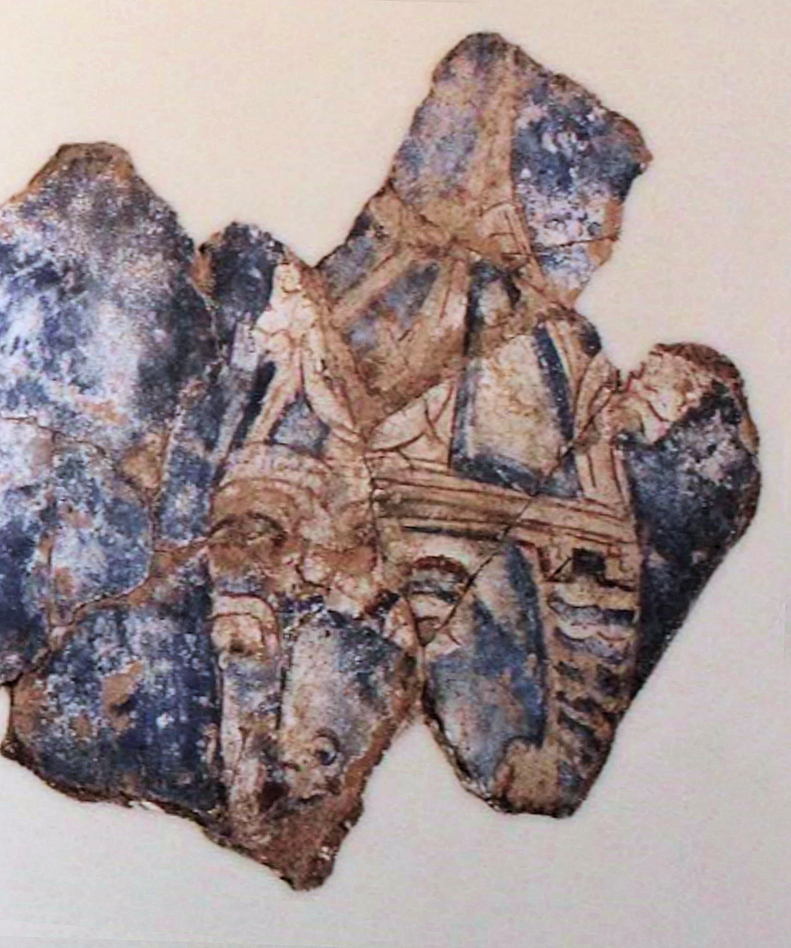
Bunjikat, figure with pointed and crescented helmet.

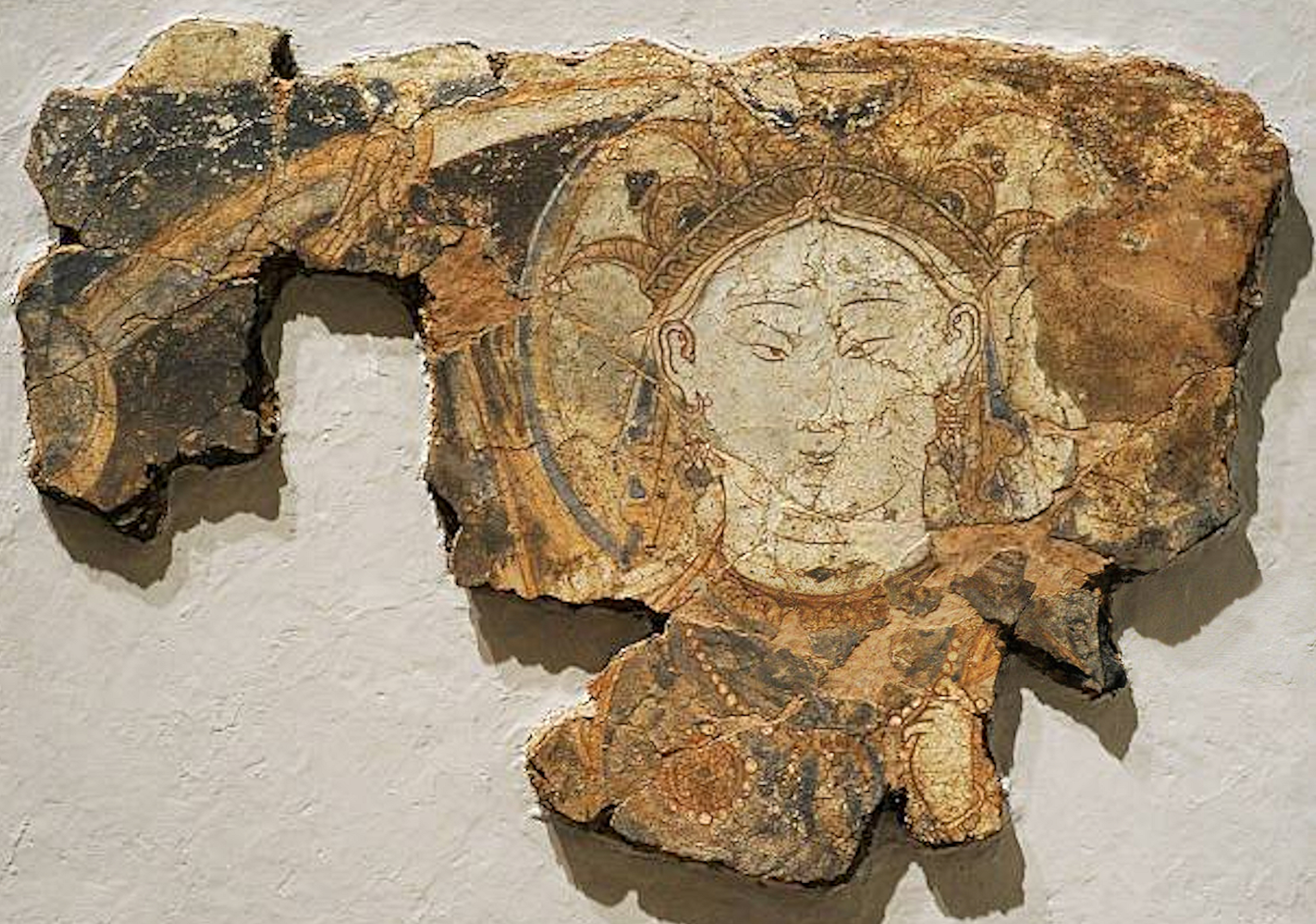
Deity, Kalai Khakaha, early 9th century CE, Hermitage Museum.

== See also ==
- Principality of Khuttal
- Principality of Chaghaniyan
- Bukhar Khudahs
- Principality of Farghana

== Sources ==
- Blankinship, Khalid Yahya (1994). The End of the Jihâd State: The Reign of Hishām ibn ʻAbd al-Malik and the Collapse of the Umayyads. Albany, New York: State University of New York Press. ISBN 978-0-7914-1827-7.
- Gibb, H. A. R. (1923). The Arab Conquests in Central Asia. London: The Royal Asiatic Society.
- B. A. Litvinsky, Ahmad Hasan Dani (1996). History of Civilizations of Central Asia: The crossroads of civilizations, A.D. 250 to 750. UNESCO. ISBN 9789231032110.
- Treadgold, Warren (1997). A History of the Byzantine State and Society. Stanford, California: Stanford University Press. ISBN 0-8047-2630-2.
- Le Strange, Guy (1905). The Lands of the Eastern Caliphate: Mesopotamia, Persia, and Central Asia, from the Moslem Conquest to the Time of Timur. Cambridge: Cambridge University Press.
- Al-Ya'qubi, Ahmad ibn Abu Ya'qub. Historiae, Vol. 2. Ed. M. Th. Houtsma. Leiden: E. J. Brill, 1883.
- Al-Ya'qubi, Ahmad ibn Abu Ya'qub. Kitab al-Buldan. Ed. M.J. de Goeje. 2nd ed. Leiden: E.J. Brill, 1892.
- Kramers, J.H. (2000). "Usrushana". In Bearman, P. J.; Bianquis, Th.; Bosworth, C. E.; van Donzel, E. & Heinrichs, W. P. (eds.). The Encyclopaedia of Islam, Second Edition. Volume X: T–U. Leiden: E. J. Brill. ISBN 978-90-04-11211-7.
- Kraemer, Joel L., trans. The History of al-Tabari, Volume XXXIV: Incipient Decline. By al-Tabari. Ed. Ehsan Yar-Shater. Albany, NY: State University of New York Press, 1989. ISBN 0-88706-874-X
- Al-Tabari, Abu Ja'far Muhammad ibn Jarir. The History of al-Tabari. Ed. Ehsan Yar-Shater. 40 vols. Albany, NY: State University of New York Press, 1985-2007.
- Barthold, W. & Gibb, H.A.R. (1960). "Afshin". In Gibb, H. A. R.; Kramers, J. H.; Lévi-Provençal, E.; Schacht, J.; Lewis, B. & Pellat, Ch. (eds.). The Encyclopaedia of Islam, Second Edition. Volume I: A–B. Leiden: E. J. Brill. OCLC 495469456.
- Kennedy, Hugh. The Armies of the Caliphs: Military and Society in the Early Islamic State. New York: Routledge, 2001. ISBN 0-415-25093-5
- Bosworth, C. Edmund. "Afsin." Encyclopaedia Iranica, Volume I. Ed. Ehsan Yarshater. London: Routledge & Kegan Paul, 1985. ISBN 0-7100-9098-6
