= Kawus ibn Kharakhuruh =

9th-century rulers in Asia

- كاوس بن خراخوره

Afshin of Ushrusana
- In office ca. 800 – 822
- Preceded by: Kharakhuruh
- Succeeded by: Khaydar

Personal details
- Children: Khaydar
- Relatives: Kharakhuruh (father)
- Known for: Ruler of Ushrusana, converted to Islam

Kawus ibn Kharakhuruh was the ruler (Sogdian: afshin) of the Principality of Ushrusana during the 9th century. He was the son and successor of Kharakhuruh.

== Biography ==
Kawus is first mentioned in ca. 802, when the Abbasid prince al-Ma'mun made several campaigns against Osrushana in order to ensure that Kawus stayed loyal to him. However, when al-Ma'mun ascended the Abbasid throne in 813, Kawus declared independence from the Abbasid Caliphate. In ca. 818, a civil war ensued in Osrushana between several princes. Kawus managed to emerge victorious, while his son Khaydar fled to the Abbasid court in Baghdad.

In 822, an Abbasid army under Ahmad ibn Abi Khalid al-Ahwal conquered Osrushana and captured Kawus ibn Kharakhuruh; he was sent to Baghdad, where he submitted to the Caliph and converted to Islam. From this point on, Osrushana was generally considered to be part of the Abbasid state, although the afshīns were allowed to retain their control over the country as subjects of the caliph. Kawus died sometime later, and was succeeded by his son Khaydar.

== Sources ==
- Bosworth, C. Edmund. "Afsin." Encyclopaedia Iranica, Volume I. Ed. Ehsan Yarshater. London: Routledge & Kegan Paul, 1985. ISBN 0-7100-9098-6
- Kramers, J.H. (2000). "Usrushana". In Bearman, P. J.; Bianquis, Th.; Bosworth, C. E.; van Donzel, E. & Heinrichs, W. P. (eds.). The Encyclopaedia of Islam, Second Edition. Volume X: T–U. Leiden: E. J. Brill. ISBN 978-90-04-11211-7.
- Kennedy, Hugh (2001). The Armies of the Caliphs: Military and Society in the Early Islamic State. London and New York: Routledge. ISBN 0-415-25093-5.
- Al-Baladhuri, Ahmad ibn Jabir. The Origins of the Islamic State, Part II. Trans. Francis Clark Murgotten. New York: Columbia University, 1924.

Preceded by Kharakhuruh	Afshin of Osrushana ca. 800–???	Succeeded by Khaydar
