= Ishtakhaniyya =

The Ishtakhaniyya were drawn from Ishtikhan in Central Asia

The Ishtakhaniyya (Arabic: الإشتاخنية al-Ishtākhaniyyah) were a regiment in the regular army of the Abbasid Caliphate during the ninth century. The regiment consisted of soldiers who were originally from the town and district of Ishtikhan in Transoxania. The exact name of the Ishtakhaniyya is given variously in the sources, with the forms Ishtikhaniyya (Arabic: الإشتاخنية al-Ishtīkhaniyyah) and Ishtakhanjiyya (Arabic: الإشتاخنجية al-Ishtākhanjiyyah) presumably being variant names for the unit.

== History ==
The Ishtakhaniyya appear to have been active during the mid-ninth century, especially in the period when the Abbasid caliphs resided at Samarra. Compared to other Transoxanian regiments in the army such as the Faraghina or the Ushrusaniyya, however, they are infrequently mentioned in the sources. During the caliphate of al-Mu'tasim (r. 833–842), the Ishtakhaniyya were, along with the other units of the army, stationed in Samarra after its construction in 836; al-Ya'qubi mentions that the officers of the Faraghina, Ushrusaniyya, Ishtakhanjiyya and other units from Khurasan resided along the city avenue called Shari' al-Hayr al-Jadid.

In 845 the Ishtakhaniyya may have participated in Bugha al-Kabir's campaign against the disorderly Banu Sulaym in the vicinity of Medina. In 870 they were one of several army units that attempted to defend the caliph al-Muhtadi (r. 869–870) against the rebellion of the Turkish troops. After 870 the Ishtakhaniyya largely disappear in the sources; it is possible that the unit was disbanded during the caliphate of al-Mu'tamid (r. 870–892).
