= Ahmad ibn Abi Khalid al-Ahwal =

Military leader and administrator during the Abbasid Caliphate

Ahmad Ibn Abi Khalid al-Ahwal
- أحمد بن أبي خالد الأحول

Vizier of the Abbasid Caliphate
- Preceded by: Thumama ibn Ashras

Personal details
- Occupation: Military leader, Administrator
- Known for: Conquest of Ushrusana, Vizier under Caliph al-Ma'mun

Ahmad ibn Abi Khalid al-Ahwal was a military leader and administrator during the Abbasid Caliphate. He is known for leading an Abbasid army that conquered the Principality of Ushrusana in 822. This military campaign resulted in the capture of Kawus ibn Kharakhuruh, the ruler of Ushrusana, who was then sent to Baghdad, where he submitted to the Caliph and converted to Islam.

== Career ==
Al-Ahwal was appointed as a vizier by Caliph Al-Ma'mun, succeeding Thumama ibn Ashras, who declined the position. Thumama ibn Ashras, a prominent Mu'tazila theologian, referred to Ahmad as the ‘only one’ at court ‘without an official title’ before his appointment.
