= Thumama ibn Ashras =

Mu'tazila theologian

- ثمامة بن الأشرس

Vizier of the Abbasid Caliphate
- Succeeded by: Ahmad Ibn Abi Khalid al-Ahwal

Personal details
- Died: 828 CE
- Occupation: Theologian, Administrator
- Known for: Mu'tazila theology, Service under the Barmakids, Influence on Caliph al-Ma'mun

Thumama (Thumamah) ibn Ashras (died 828 CE/212-213 AH) (Arabic: ثمامة بن الأشرس), also known as Abu Maʿn al-Numayri (أبو معن النميري) was a Mu'tazila theologian during the era of the Abbasid Caliphate, the third Islamic caliphate.

== Life ==
Thumama ibn Ashras was of Arab descent. He served under an influential family during the Abbasid era, the Barmakids, and was arrested when they fell from favour in 802 CE. His reputation was sufficiently restored by around the year 807 CE that Harun al-Ras̲h̲d had him join his expedition to Khorasan.

Alon describes ibn Ashras as the 'court theologian' of Al-Ma'mun; Nawas reckons him a 'prominent Mu'tazilite'. Al-Ma'mun hoped to make him vizier, but ibn Ashras declined, apparently because the position of vizier was a target of controversy at the time; the caliph later reportedly gave ibn Ashras 300,000 dirhams to express his appreciation for ibn Ashras's services at court. Ahmad ibn Abi Khalid al-Ahwal, named vizier in ibn Ashras's place, called ibn Ashras the 'only one' at court 'without an official title'.

An ancient report suggests that ibn Ashras had convinced Al-Ma'mun to adopt Mu'tazila theology. Another report, in History of Baghdad by Al-Khatib al-Baghdadi, states that ibn Ashras disparaged Abu-l-'Atahiya in a meeting before Al-Ma'mun, when the poet Atahiya had challenged ibn Ashras to defend Mu'tazila doctrine on the origin of human action.

At one point, ibn Ashras was held captive by Turks. He was treated so well during his imprisonment, however, that he grew to favour Turkish mercenaries.

== Doctrines ==
Unlike many theologians of the time, ibn Ashras did not write a large number of treatises. Accordingly, his religious views survive mainly in reports from conversations and debates he had with other figures of the time, including Yahya ibn Aktham, with whom he discussed free will.

Ibn Ashras taught that nonbelievers need not be blameworthy for their unbelief unless they explicitly rejected revelation.

He argued that love occurs 'when the essences of souls have mingled through the bond of likeness'.

== Sources ==
- van Ess, Josef (2017). A History of Religious Thought in Early Islam. Theology and Society in the Second and Third Centuries of the Hijra. Vol. 3. Brill. doi:10.1163/9789004356405. ISBN 978-90-04-35640-5.
- McKinney, Robert C. (2004). The Case of Rhyme Versus Reason: Ibn al-Rūmī and His Poetics in Context. Brill. ISBN 978-90-04-13010-4.
- Nawas, John A. (November 1994). "A Reexamination of Three Current Explanations for al-Maʾmun's Introduction of the Miḥna". International Journal of Middle East Studies. 26 (4): 615–629. doi:10.1017/S0020743800061134. ISSN 0020-7438. S2CID 159973328.
