= Osrushana =

Historic region in Transoxiana, Central Asia

- Osrushana
- Osrushana
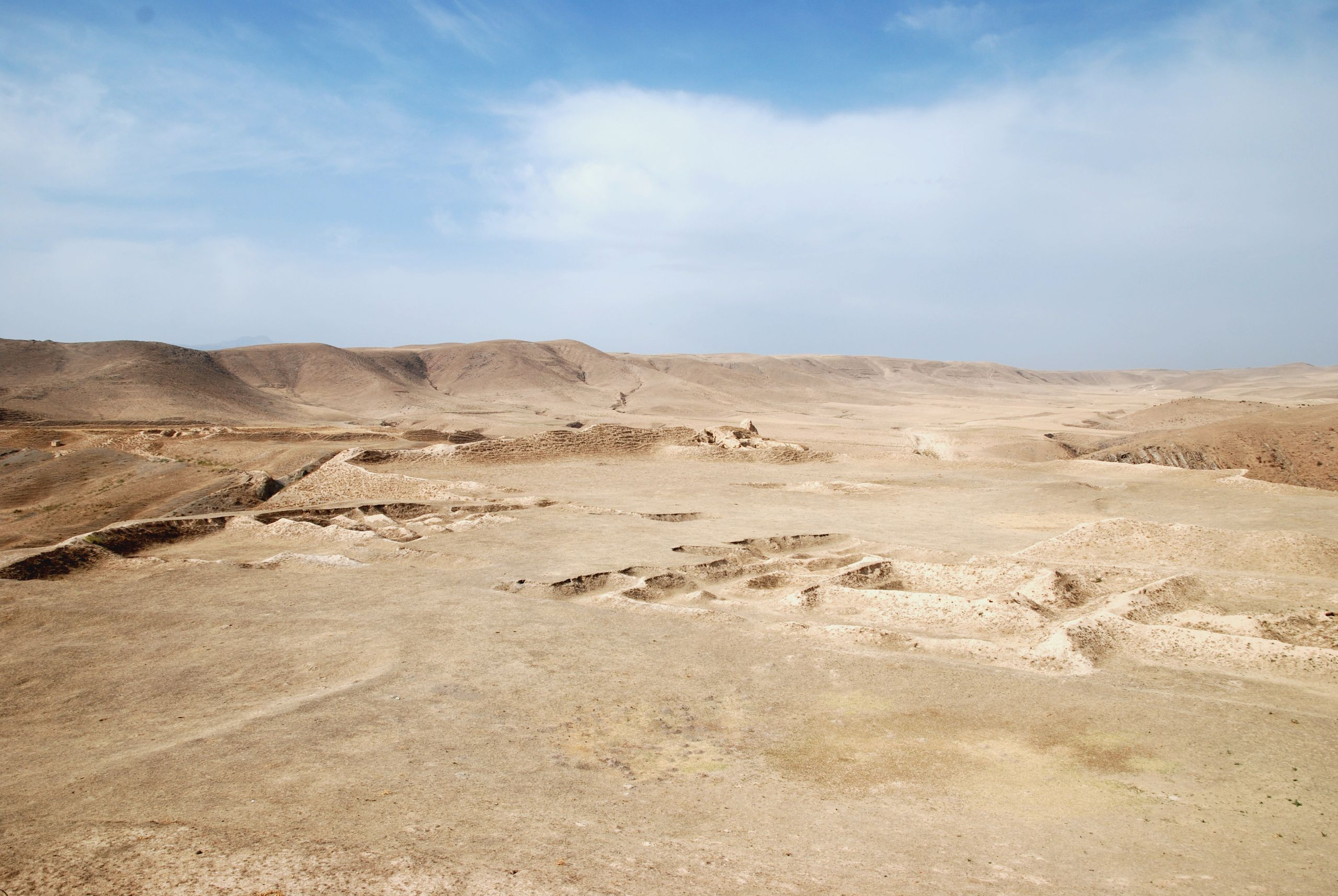
- Bunjikat, ancient capital of Osrushana

- Location of Bunjikat, ancient capital of Osrushana Osrushana (Tajikistan)
- 39°46′12.4″N 68°47′55.6″E
- Type: Settlement
- Location: Tajikistan

Osrušana (Persian: اسروشنه) or Ustrushana (Note: Also known as Ošrusana (اُشروسنه), "Istaravshan" (in present day Tajikistan), "Sudujshana", "Usrushana", "Ustrushana", "Eastern Cao", etc.) was a former Iranian region in Transoxiana, home to the Principality of Ushrusana, an important pre-Islamic polity of Central Asia. Oshrusana lay to the south of the great, southernmost bend of the Syr Darya and extended roughly from Samarkand to Khujand. The capital city of Oshrusana was Bunjikat. The exact form of the Iranian name Osrušana is not clear from the sources, but the forms given in Hudud al-'alam, indicate an original *Sorušna.

== History ==
Ustrushana had close historical, cultural, ethnic and linguistic ties to Sogdia. It originally formed part of the territory of Sogdia, but then developed its own identity as the area became more urbanized. From the fifth to the seventh century CE, Ushrusana was part of the territory of the Hephthalites, followed by the Western Turkic Khaganate after 560 CE. The Principality probably retained a certain level of autonomy throughout this period and was ruled directly by the afshins.

The most famous afshin was Khaydhar ibn Kawus al-Afshin. Knowledge of the ruling family of Ushrusana is derived from the accounts by Muslim historians such as al-Tabari, al-Baladhuri, and Ya'qubi of the final subjugation of that region by the Abbasid Caliphate and the submission of its rulers to Islam.

When the first Muslim invasion of Persia took place under Qutayba ibn Muslim (94-5/712-14), Ushrusana was inhabited by an Iranian population population. The first invasion by the Muslims did not result in them controlling the area.

According to the Encyclopedia of Islam:

In 119 AH/737 AD the Turkic enemies of the governor Asad b. Abdallāh al-Ghasrī fell back on Usrūshana (al-Tabarī, ii, 1613). Nasr b. Sayyār subdued the country incompletely in 121/739 (al-Balādhurī, 429; al-Tabarī, ii, 1694), and the Afshin again made a nominal submission to Mahdī (al-Yaqūbī, Tarīkh, ii, 479). Under Mamūn, the country had to be conquered again and a new expedition was necessary in 207/822. On this last occasion, the Muslim army was guided by Haydar (Khedar), the son of the Afshīn Kāwūs, who on account of dynastic troubles had sought refuge in Baghdād. This time the submission was complete; Kāwūs abdicated and Haydar succeeded him, later to become one of the great nobles of the court of Baghdād under al-Mutasim, where he was known as al-Afshīn. His dynasty continued to reign until 280/893 (coin of the last ruler Sayr b. Abdallāh of 279 [892] in the Hermitage in St. Petersburg); after this date, the country became a province of the Sāmānids and ceased to have an independent existence, while the Iranian element was eventually almost entirely replaced by the Turkic.

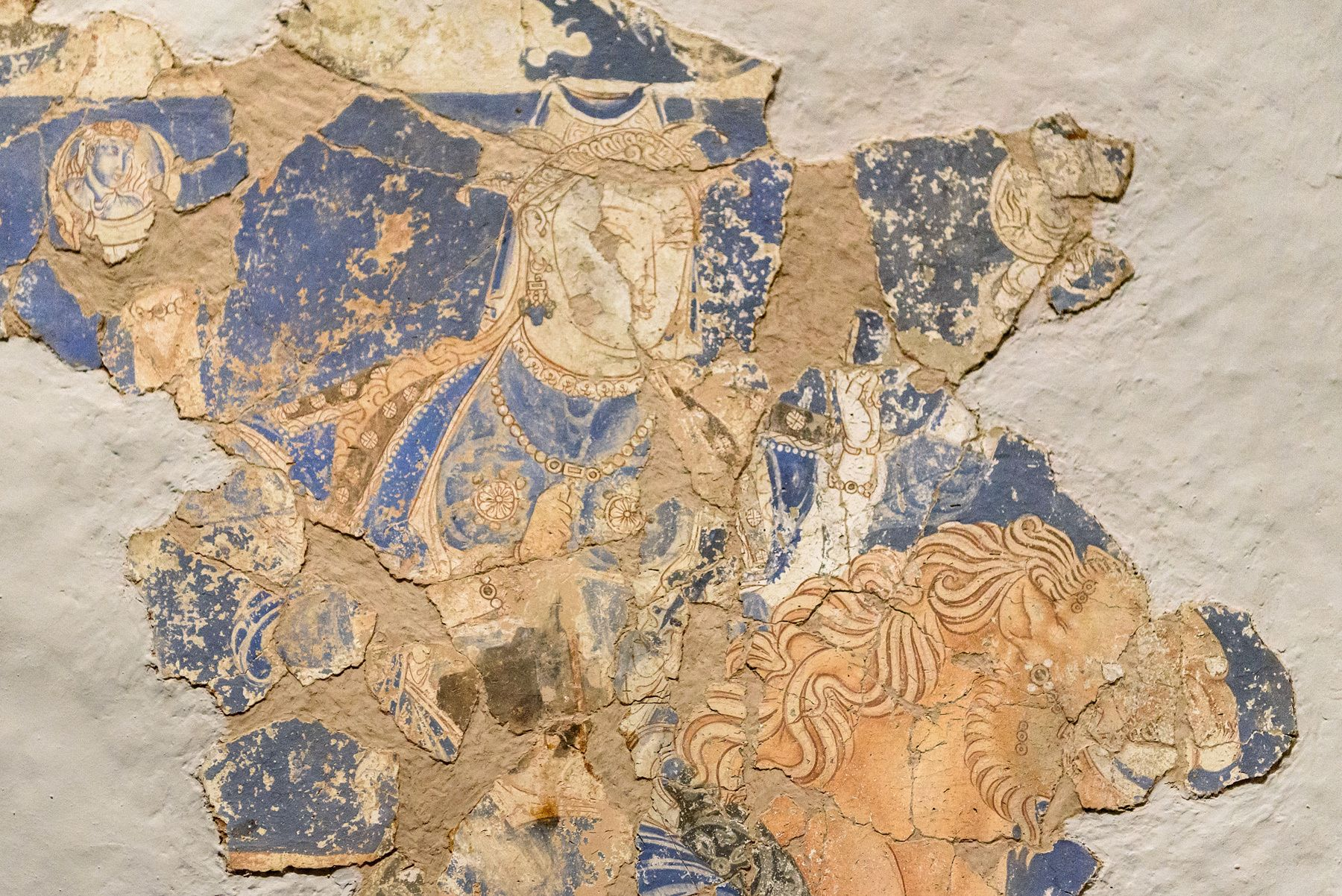
Bunjikat wall painting of goddess Nana, 8th-9th century.

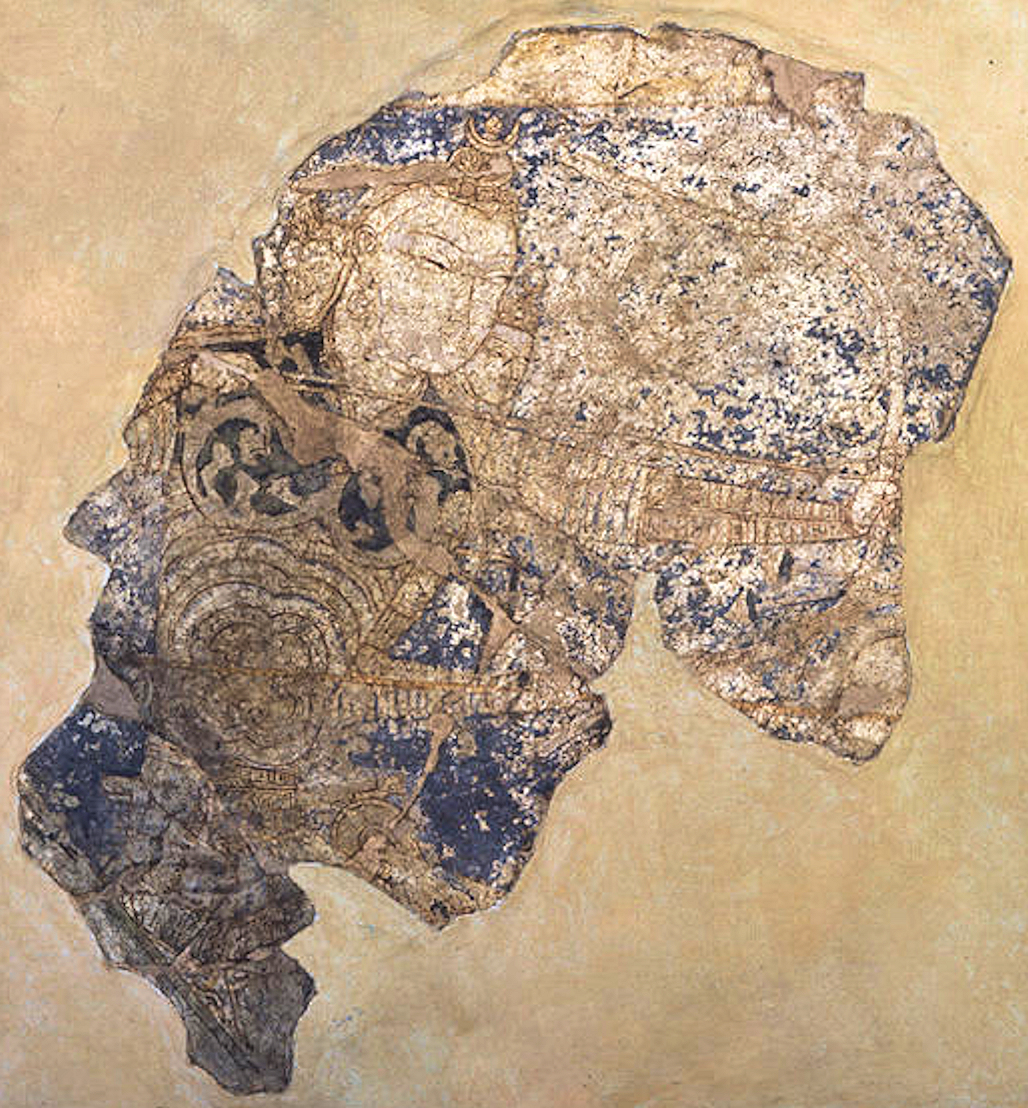
Fighting figure with bow and spear, Osrushana.

However, during the reign of the caliph al-Mahdi (775-85) the Afshin of Oshrusana is mentioned among several Iranian and Turkic rulers of Transoxania and the Central Asian steppes who submitted nominally to him. But it was not until Harun al-Rashid's reign in 794-95 that al-Fadl ibn Yahya of the Barmakids led an expedition into Transoxania and received the submission of the ruling afshin, Karākana, who had never previously humbled himself before any other potentate. Further expeditions were sent to Ushrusana by al-Ma'mūn when he was governor in Merv and after he had become caliph. The afshin Kavus, son of the afshin Karākana who had submitted to al-Fadl ibn Yahya, withdrew his allegiance from the Muslims; but shortly after Ma'mun arrived in Baghdad from the East (817-18 or 819-20), a power struggle and dissensions broke out among the ruling family.

Kawus' son afshin Khaydar became a general in the Abbasid army and fought against the Khurramites and their leader, Babak Khorramdin, in Azerbaijan (816-837). In 841, Khaydar was arrested in Samarra on suspicion of plotting against the Abbasids. A single location was used for the crucifixion of Khaydar, Maziyar, and Babak's corpses. After his death, Ustrushana was Islamified; Khaydar had preserved temples from ruin.

There are indications that semi-autonomous Afshins continued to rule over the Ustrushana after control of the region was wrested from the Abbasids by the Saffarids and, soon after, the Samanid Empire.

== See also ==
- Afshin (Caliphate General)
- Istaravshan
- Ushrusaniyya
