= Afshin Marashi =

American academic

Afshin Marashi is an American historian, with a focus on modern Iran. He is a professor of history at the University of Oklahoma. He is the current holder of the Farzaneh Family Chair in Modern Iranian History. He received his bachelor's degree in political science in 1992 from University of California, Berkeley, and his PhD from the University of California, Los Angeles in 2003. He has worked at the University of Kansas and California State University, Sacramento in the past. In addition to English, he has a reading/speaking command of Persian, and a reading command of Turkish, French and Spanish.

== Selected works ==
- Nationalizing Iran: Culture, power, and the state, 1870–1941 by Marashi, Afshin, University of California, Los Angeles, 2003, 339 pages; 3081179
- Rethinking Iranian Nationalism and Modernity (University of Texas Press, co-editor, 2014)
- Connected Histories of the Middle East and the Global South (University of Texas Press, co-editor of the book series, 2020-)
