= Afshin =

Afshin افشین
- Gender: Male
- Language: Middle Persian

Origin
- Origin: Middle Persian

Other names
- Variant forms: Afšīn, Afšin, Afşin/Afşın, Afshiin, Afsheen (Note: Anglicization of original name.)

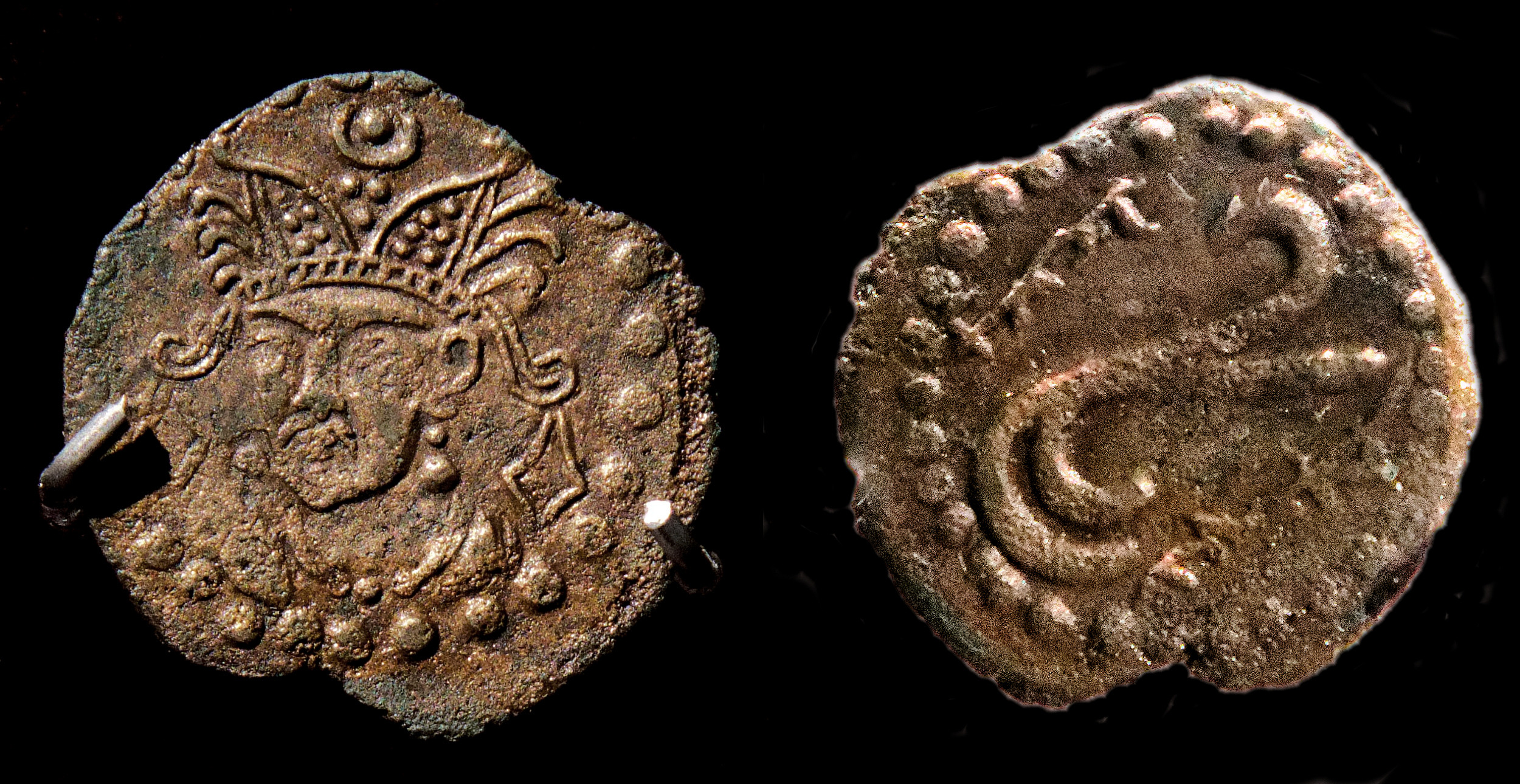
Coin in the name of Rakhanch, Sogdian Afshin of the Principality of Ushrusana. Tamgha symbol on the reverse with the title and name of the ruler. Excavated in the Palace of Kala-i Kakhkakha I, Bunjikat. 7th century CE, National Museum of Antiquities of Tajikistan (RTL 213).

Afshin (Persian: افشین, romanized: Afšin) is a common Persian given name derived from Avestan. Afshin was used by the Sogdians. Historically, it was the title of the rulers of Principality of Ushrusana in Transoxiana before the Muslim conquest of Persia.

== Etymology ==
Afšīn is form of the Middle Persian Pišīn, which traces back to Avestan Pisinah. In Persian mythology, it is the name of a grandson of Kay Kawad (Yt. 13.132, 19.71) found as a proper name attested by Armenian historians in the form Ōšin (from Awšin).

== People ==
Given name

- Afshin Bey (born 1033), Seljuk general.
- Afshin Ellian (born 1966), Iranian-Dutch professor of law, philosopher, poet, and critic of political Islam
- Afshin Esmaeilzadeh (born 1992), Iranian footballer
- Afshin Feiz, Iranian-born British photographer and ex fashion designer
- Afshin Ghaffarian (born 1986), Iranian choreographer, director, dancer, and actor
- Afshin Ghotbi (born 1964), Iranian football coach
- Afshin Habibzadeh, Iranian workers' rights activist and reformist politician
- Afshin Hajipour (born 1975), Iranian footballer
- Afshin Jafari (singer), full name Afshin Jafari, Iranian pop star
- Afshin Kamaei (born 1974), Iranian footballer
- Afshin Kazemi (born 1986), Iranian futsal player
- Afshin Marashi, Iranian-American historian
- Afshin Moghaddam (1945–1976), Iranian singer
- Afshin Mohebbi, Iranian-born United States businessman
- Afshin Molavi, Iranian-American author and expert on global geo-political risk and geo-economics, particularly the Middle East and Asia
- Afshin Naghouni (born 1969), Iranian-born British visual artist
- Afshin Nazemi (born 1971), Iranian football player and coach
- Afshin Peyrovani (born 1970), Iranian footballer and a football coach
- Afshin Norouzi (born 1985), Iranian table tennis player
- Afshin Rattansi (born 1968), British broadcaster, journalist and author
- Afshin Sadeghi (born 1993), Iranian handball player
- Afshin Zinouri (born 1976), Iranian voice actor who is known for Persian voice-dubbing foreign films and TV programs

Surname

- Arash Afshin (born 1989), Iranian footballer
- Nazanin Afshin-Jam (born 1979), Iranian-Canadian human rights activist, author

== Places ==
- Afşin, a town in the Kahramanmaraş Province in the Mediterranean region of Turkey
- Avshen, a village in the Alagyaz Municipality of the Aragatsotn Province of Armenia.

== See also ==
- Afsana (name)
