= Bunjikat (archeological site) =

Settlement in Tajikistan

- Kala-i Kachkakha
- Shahriston
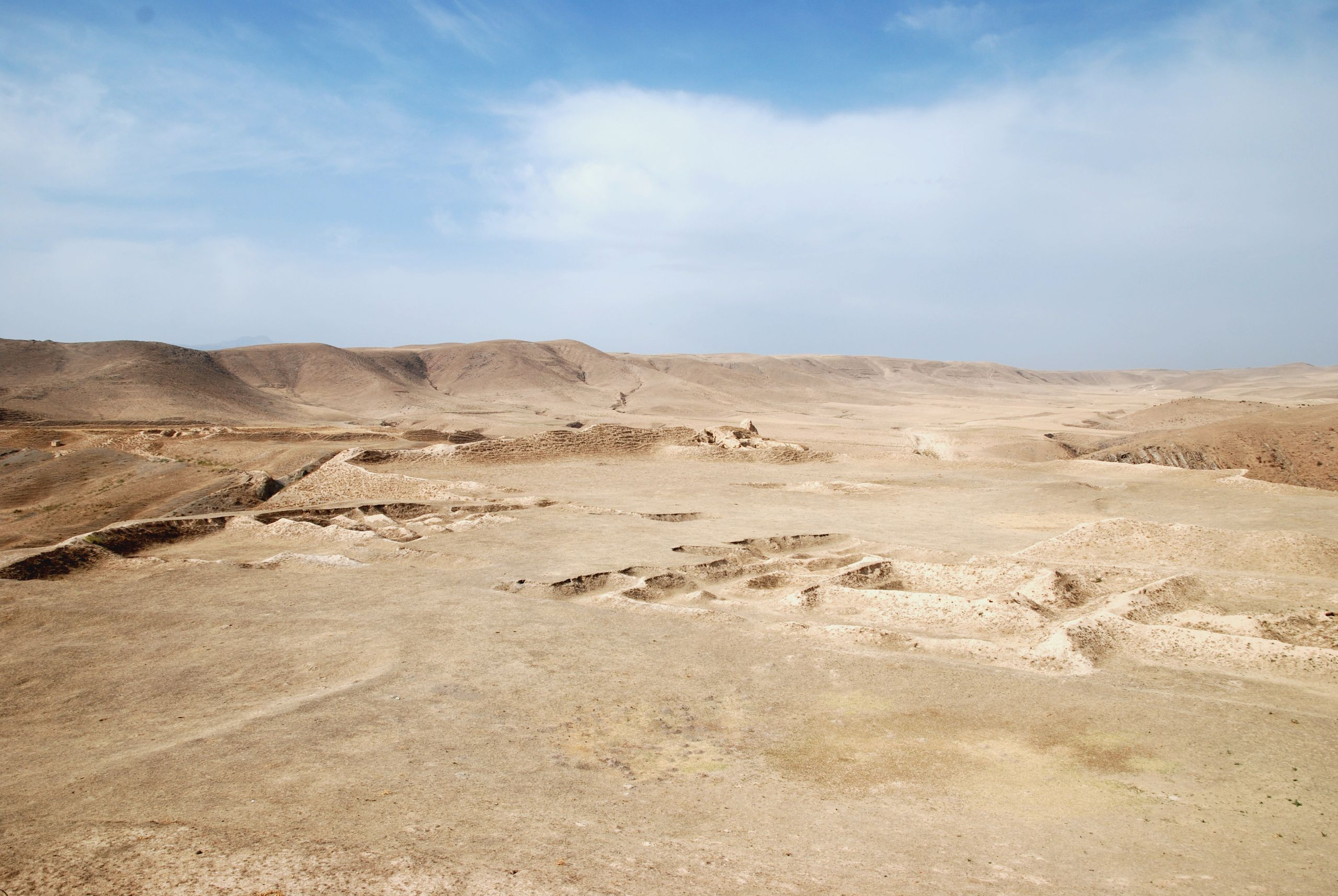
- Bunjikat, Kala-i Kahkaha 1 towards west

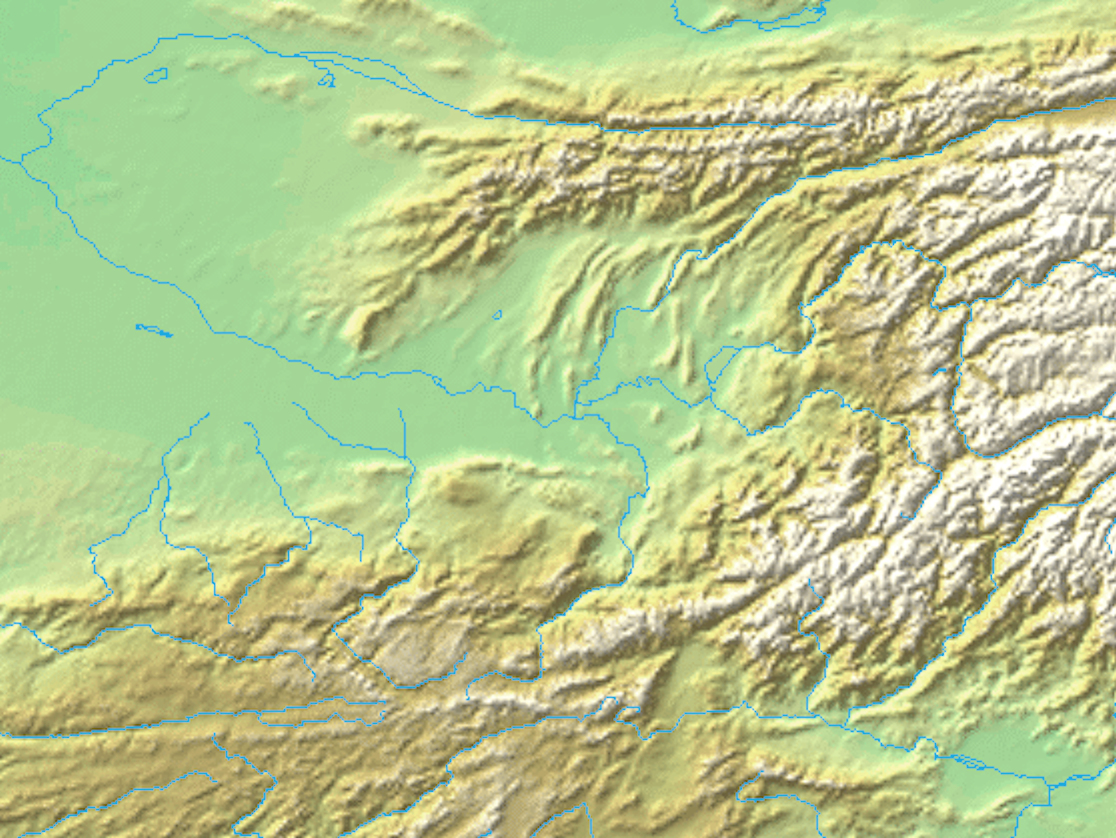
- Location within West and Central Asia Location within Bactria Location within Tajikistan
- 39°46′13″N 68°47′56″E
- Type: Settlement
- Location: Tajikistan

Site notes
- Condition: Ruined

The ancient archaeological site of Bunjikat (Russian: Бунджикат Tajik: Бунҷикат), also named Shahriston, is located near the town of Bunjikat, in the Shahristan Pass at the entrance of the Ferghana Valley, in Sughd Province of western Tajikistan, just west of the town of Kairma.

== Capital of Ustrushana ==
Bunjikat was the former capital city of the Principality of Ushrusana between the 6th and 9th Centuries CE. It replaced the older capital of Kurukada. From the 5th to the 7th century CE, Ustushana was part of the territory of the Hephthalites, followed by the Western Turks after 560 CE. The Principality probably retained a certain level of autonomy throughout this period, and was ruled directly by the afshins of the Kavus dynasty. Bunjikat maintained its sovereignty until 893 CE.

== Ruins ==
Several large buildings and fortresses are located in Bunjikat, such as Kalai Kahkaha I (a Palace) and Kalai Kahkaha II (a grand building on an elevated terrace), dated from the 6th to 8th century CE.

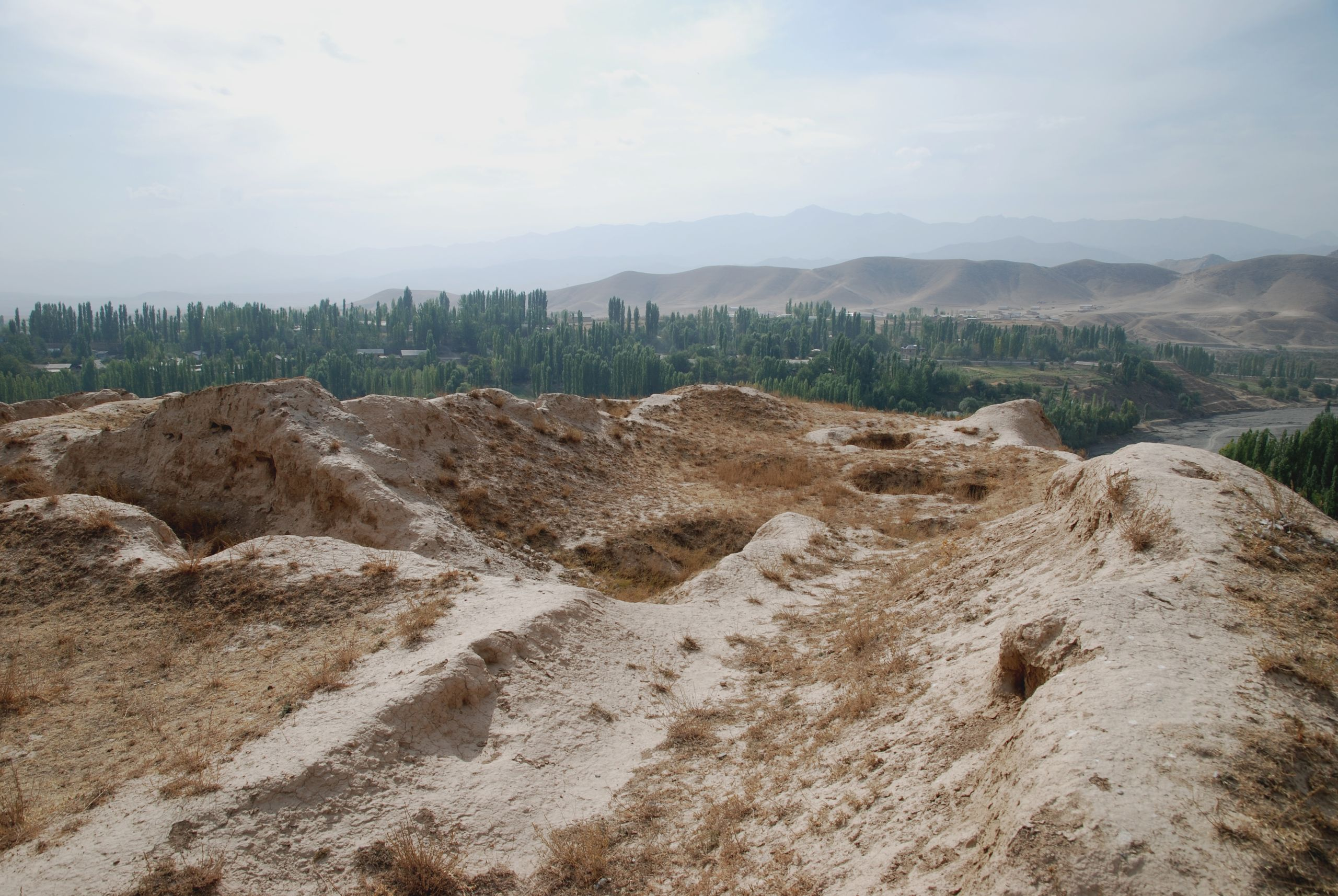
Kalai Kahkaha 1

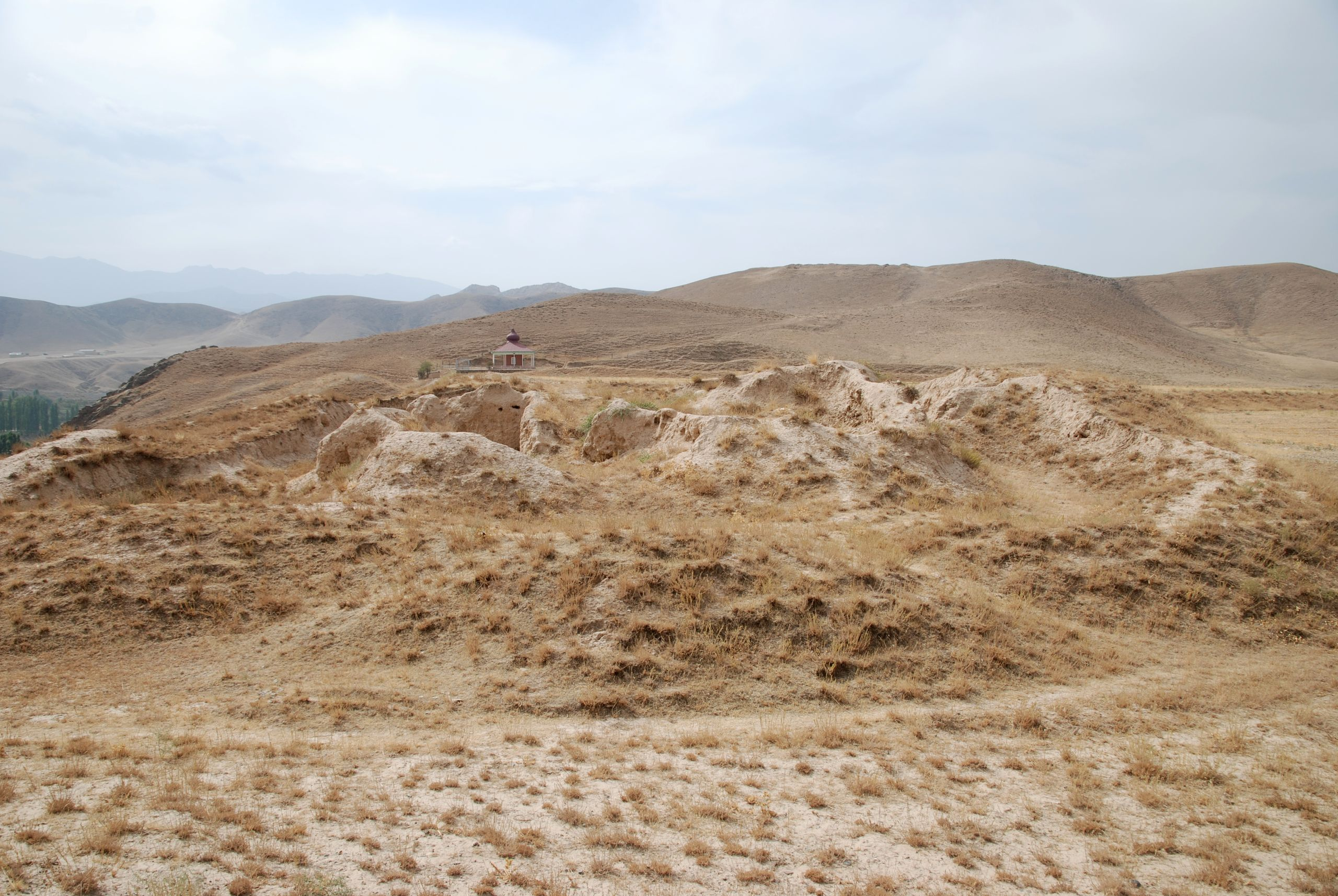
Kalai Kahkaha 2

== Works of art ==
The paintings of Bunjikat are among the most important of Sogdian art.

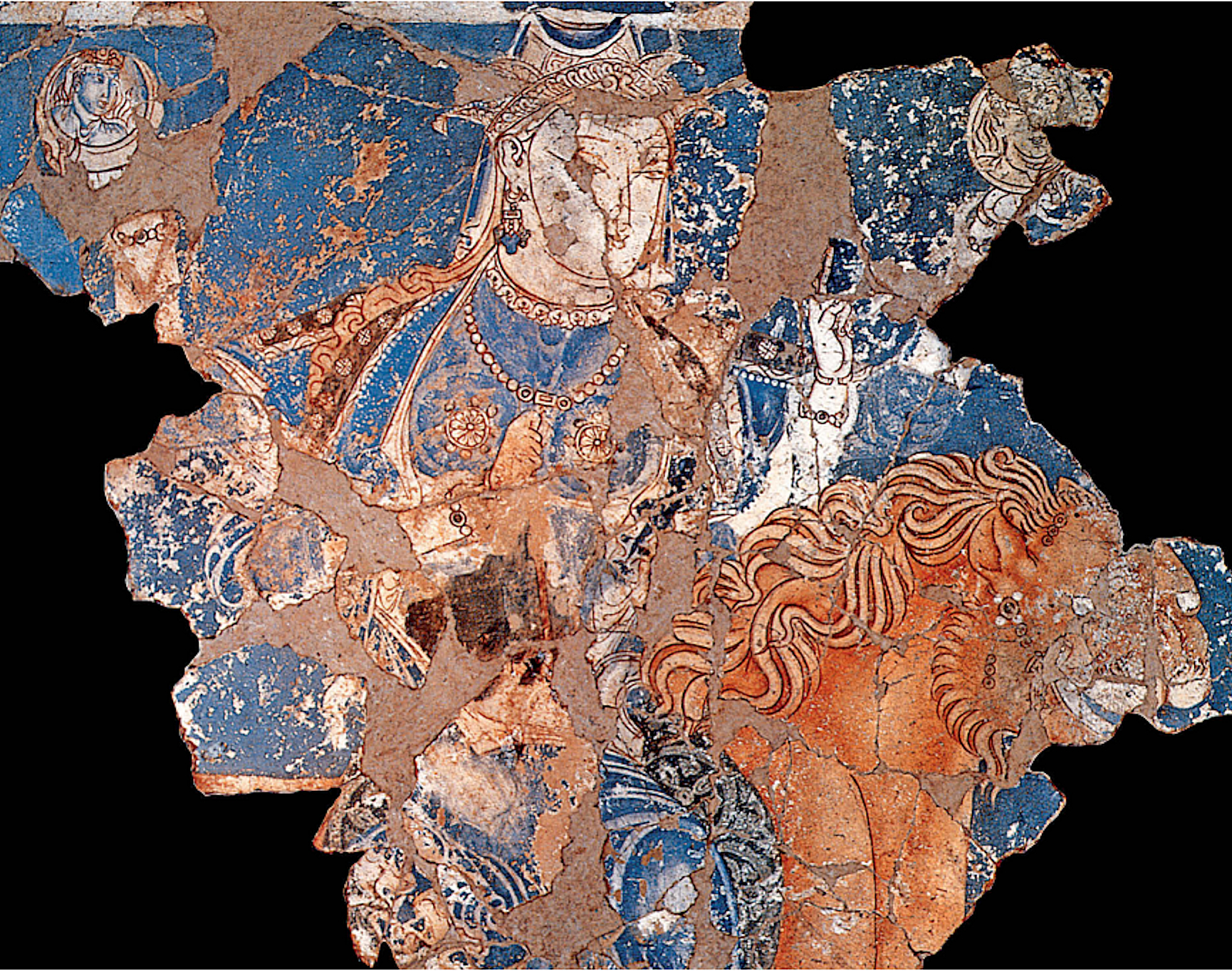
Bunjikat wall painting of goddess Nana, 8th-9th century.

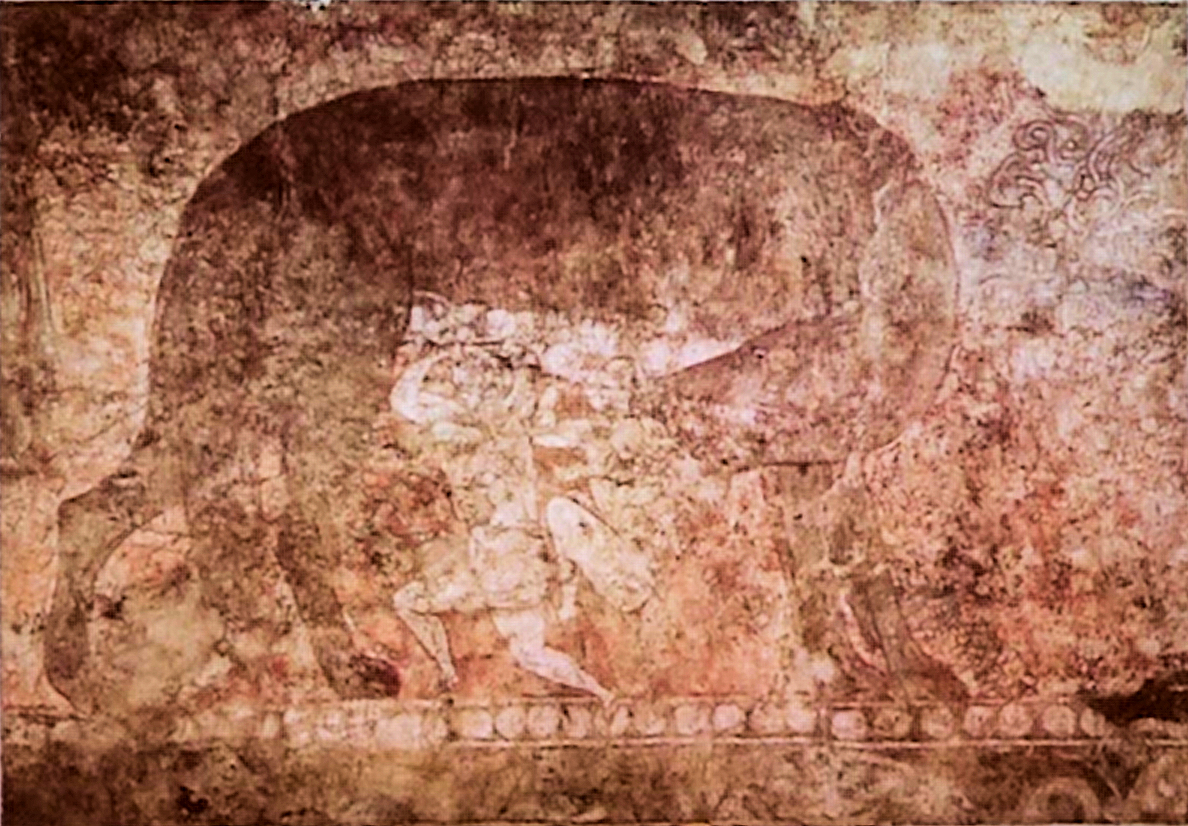
"Romulus and Remus" scene from Bunjikat.

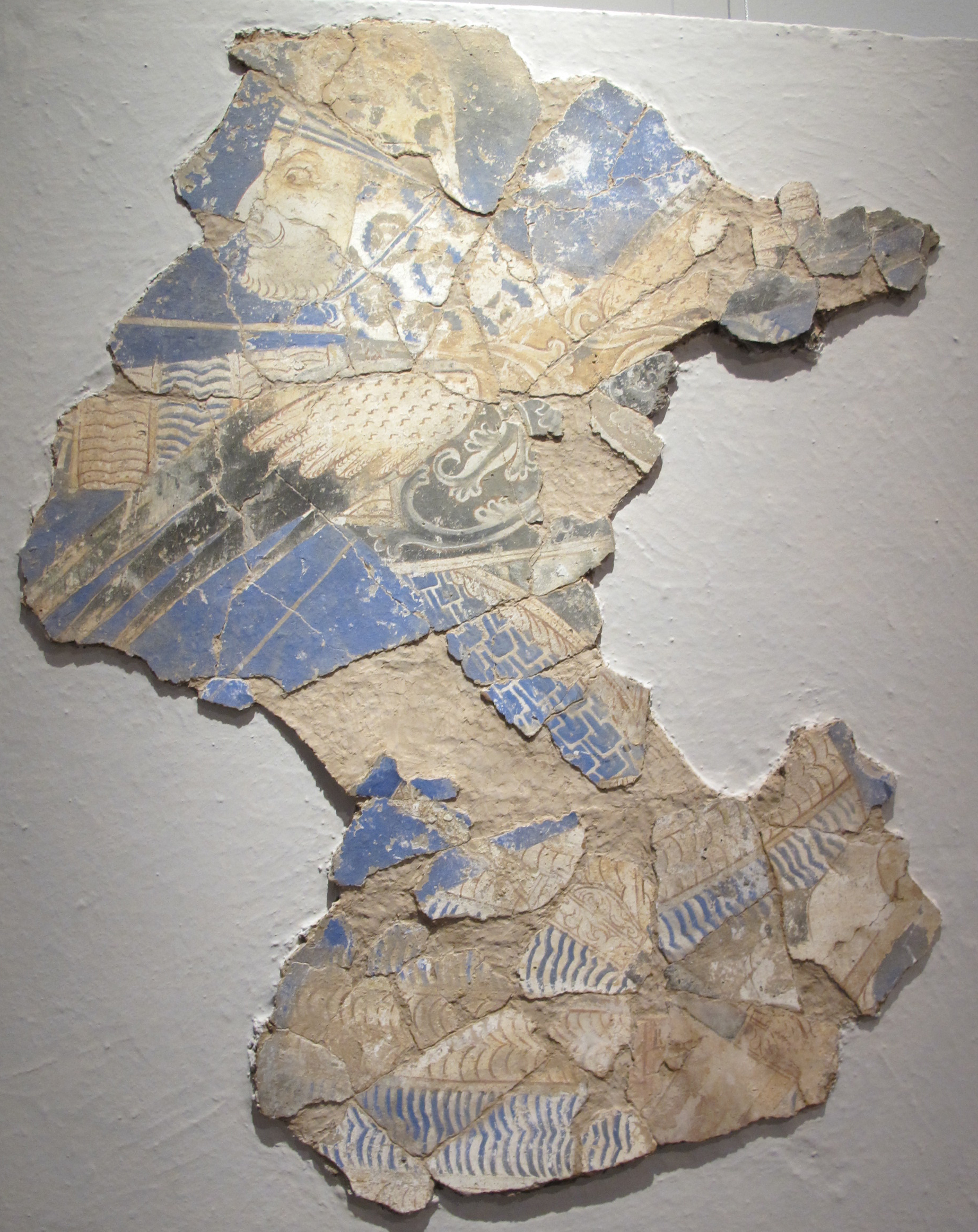
Warrior demon, Kalai Kahkaha, early 9th century CE. Hermitage Museum

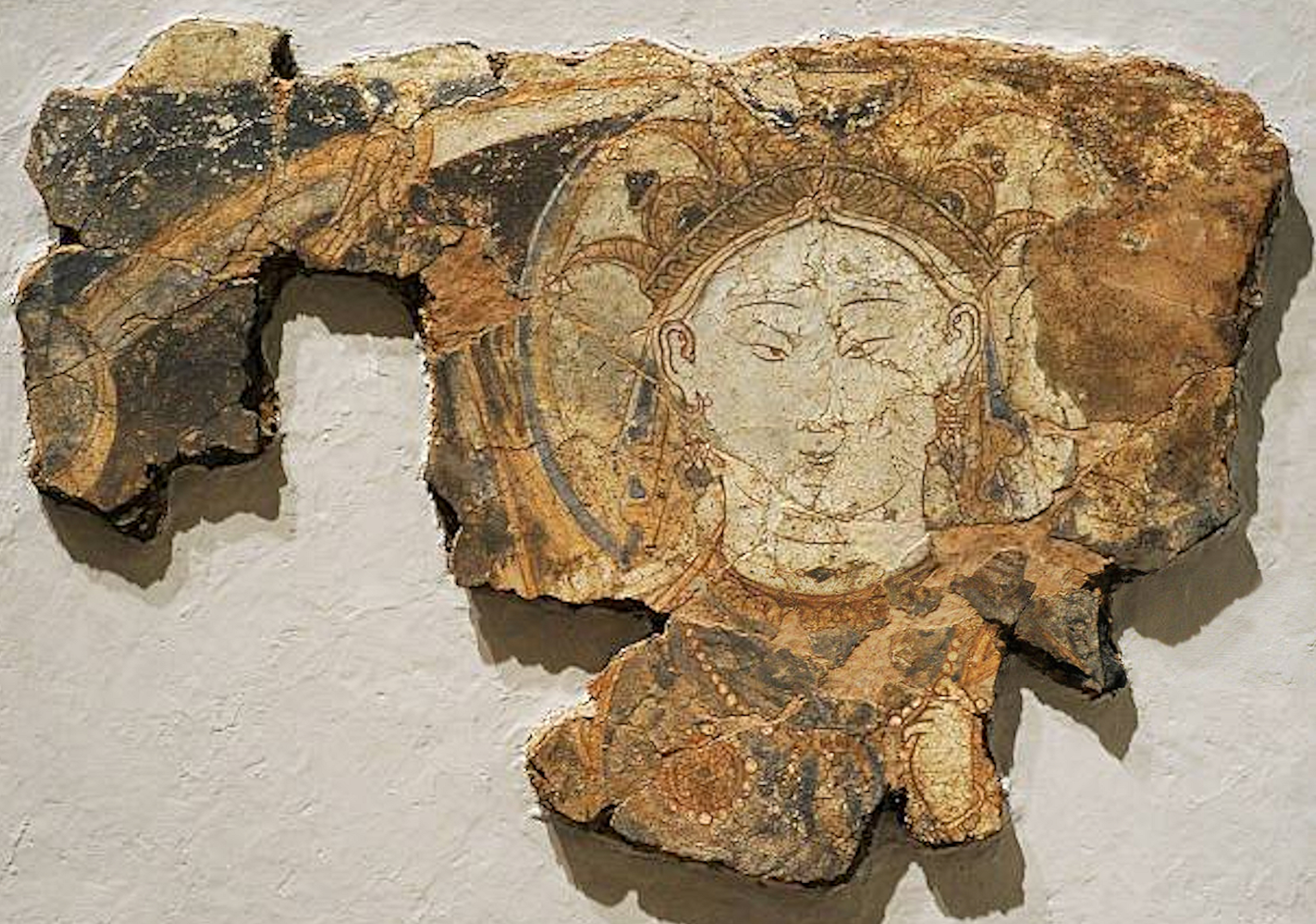
Deity, Kalai Khakaha I, early 9th century CE, Hermitage Museum.

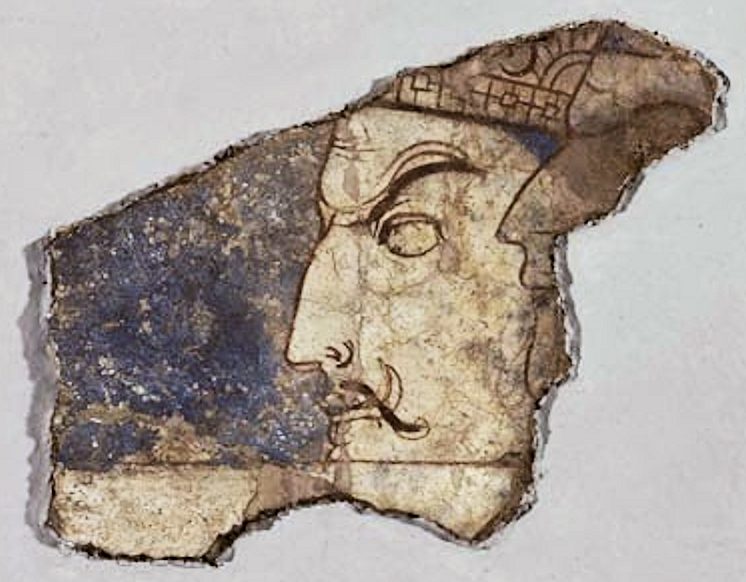
Heads of Demons, Kala-i Kahkaha I Palace, Bunjikat, Ustrushana, 8th–9th century CE.

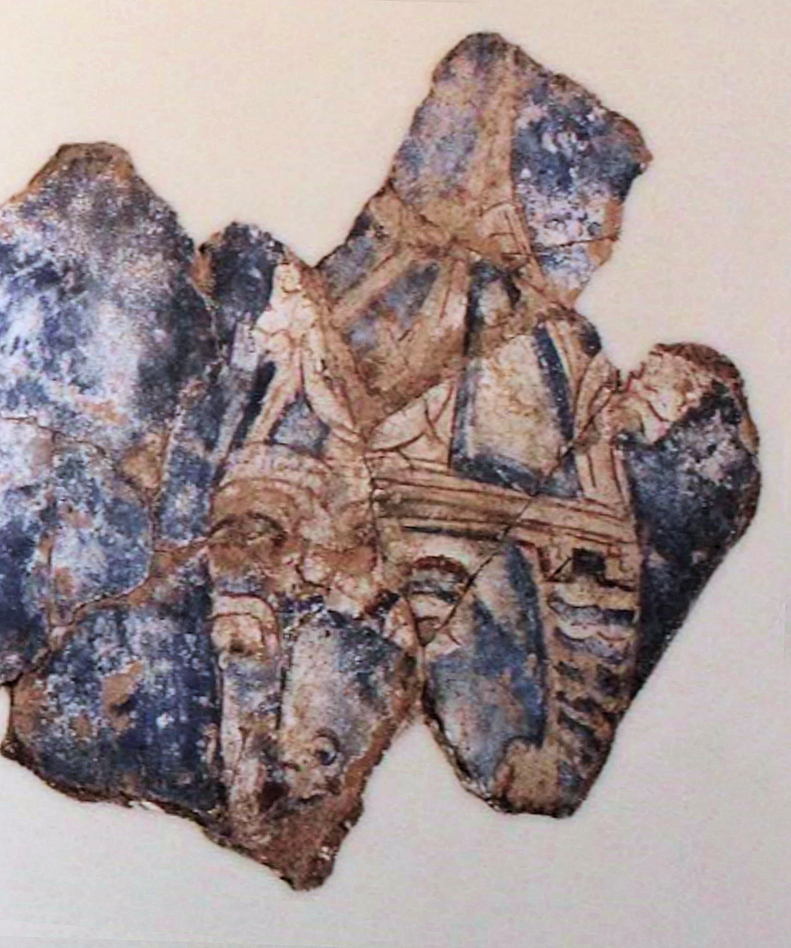
Bunjikat, figure with pointed and crescented helmet

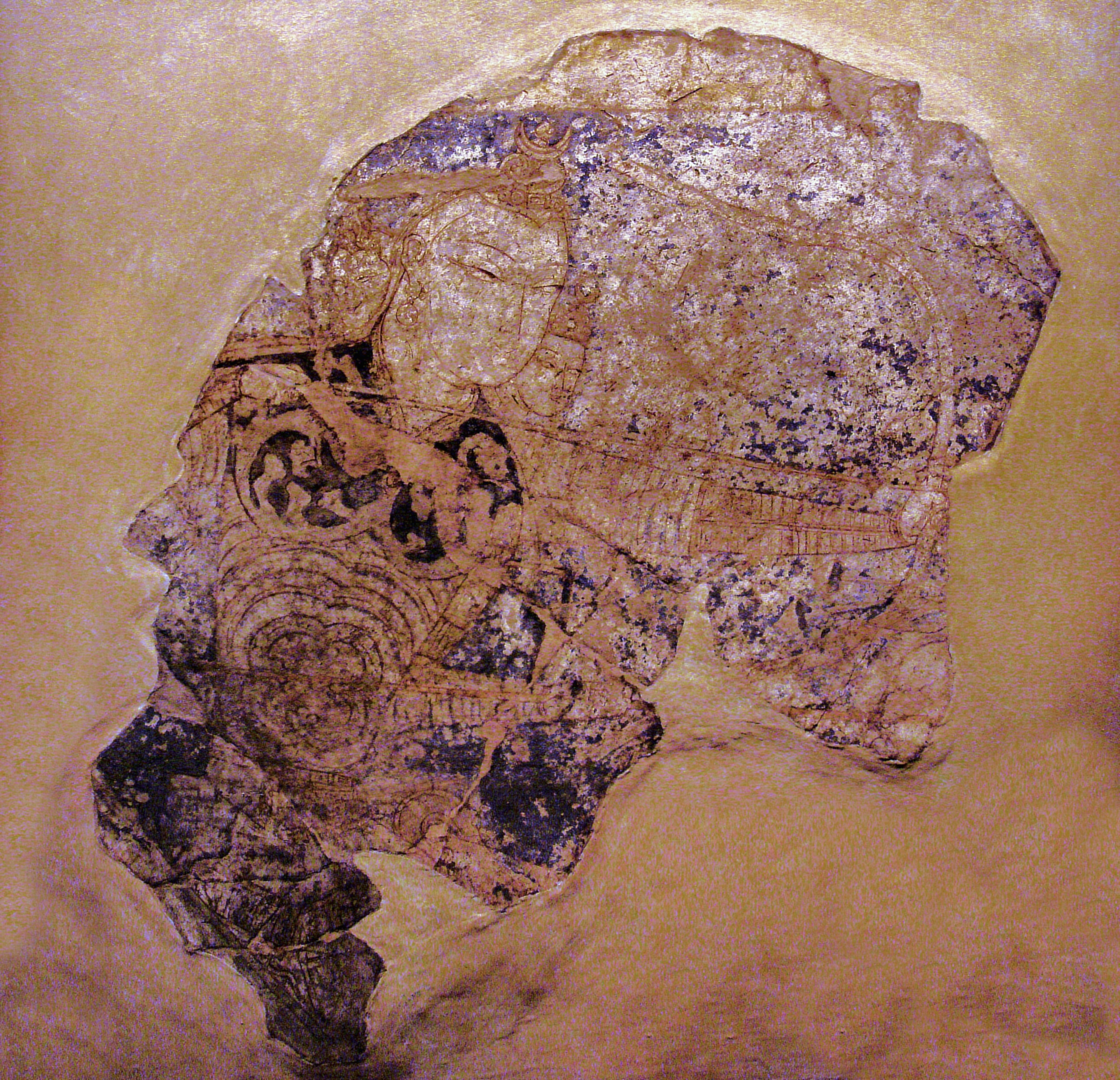
God Weshparkar with bow, Kala-i Kakhakakha I, Shahristan palace, Ustrushana, Tajikistan, 8-9th century CE, National Museum of Antiquities of Tajikistan (RTL 215)

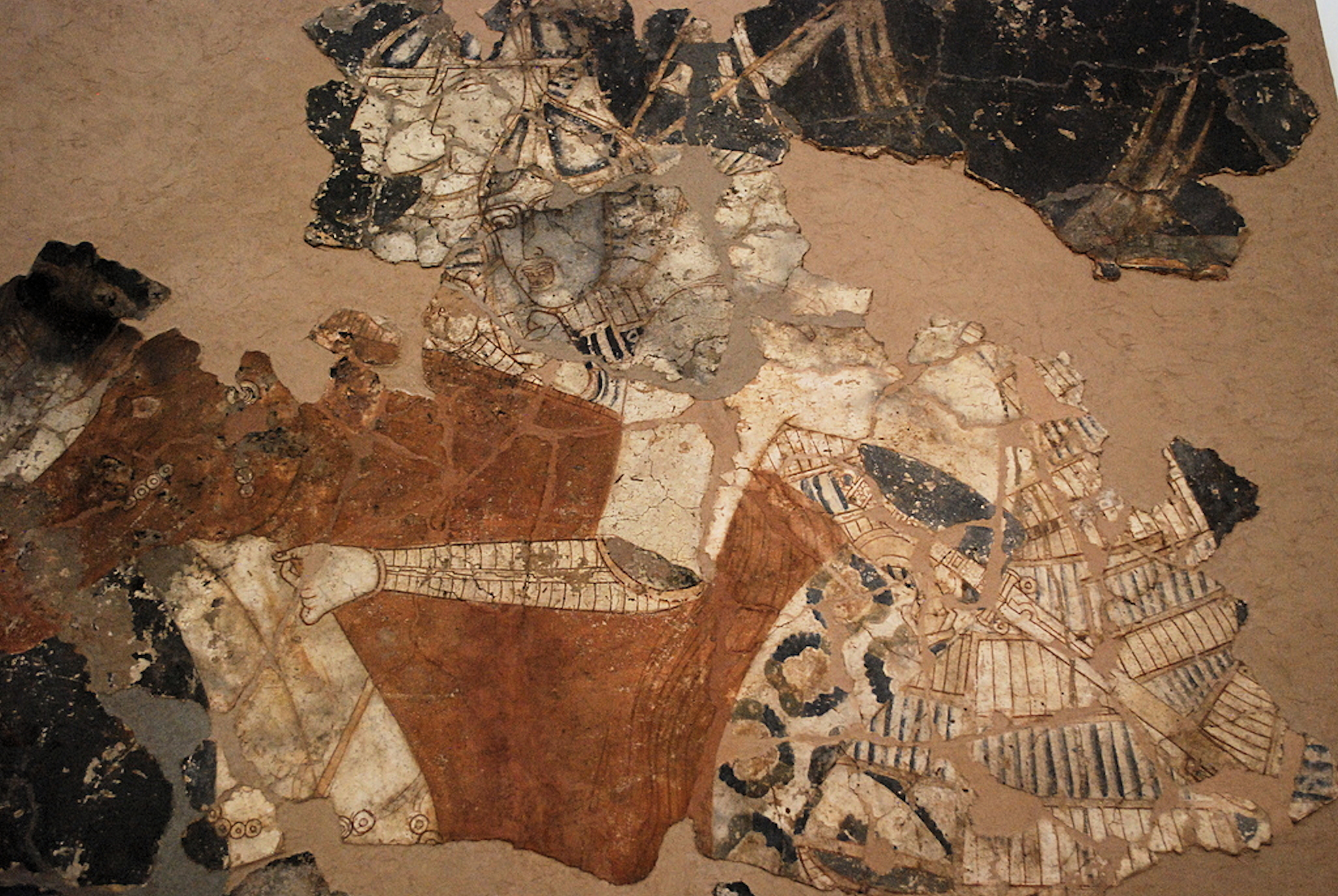
Cavalry battle scene

== World Heritage Status ==
This site was added to the UNESCO World Heritage Tentative List on November 9, 1999, in the Cultural category.
