= Sharad =

Sharad may refer to:

- Sharad (season), an Indian season
- SHARAD, a Mars probe unit

== People with the name ==
=== Politics ===
- Sharad Anantrao Joshi, Member of the Parliament of India representing Maharashtra in the Rajya Sabha
- Sharad Bansode, Indian politician
- Sharad Chauhan, Indian politician
- Sharad Dighe, former member of the Indian National Congress from Mumbai
- Sharad Kumar Awasthi, Indian politician, former MLA from Ram Nagar, Uttar Pradesh
- Sharad Pawar, Indian politician, president of the Nationalist Congress Party
- Sharad Ranpise, member of the Indian National Congress
- Sharad Singh Bhandari, Nepalese politician
- Sharad Tripathi, Indian politician, member of the Bharatiya Janata Party
- Sharad Yadav, Indian politician

=== Film and television ===
- Sharad Gogate, Indian publisher and writer
- Sharad Haskar, Indian photographer
- Sharad Joshi, Indian poet, writer, satirist and a dialogue and scriptwriter in Hindi films and television
- Sharad Kapoor, Indian actor in Hindi films
- Sharad Kelkar, Indian actor in Hindi and Marathi films and television
- Sharad Malhotra, Indian actor in Hindi films and television
- Sharad Ponkshe, Indian actor and writer
- Sharad Sharma, Indian cartoonist
- Sharad Talwalkar, Indian actor in Marathi films and television

=== Law and order ===
- Sharad Bobde, 47^{th} Chief Justice of India
- Sharad Kumar (police officer), former Indian Police Service officer
- Sharad Rao (judge), Indian judge

=== Medicine ===
- Sharad Kumar Dixit, Indian-American plastic surgeon
- Sharad Panday, Indian heart surgeon
- Sharad Vaidya, Indian surgeon

=== Sports ===
- Sharad Diwadkar, Indian cricketer
- Sharad Hazare, Indian cricketer
- Sharad Kumar (athlete), Indian paralympic high jumper
- Sharad Rao (cricketer), Indian cricketer
- Sharad Vesawkar, Nepalese cricketer

=== Entrepreneur ===
- Sharad Devarajan, CEO of Gotham Comics
- Sharad Sagar, Indian social entrepreneur and the founder and CEO of Dexterity Global

== See also ==
- Sharad Kumar (disambiguation)
- Sharada (disambiguation)
- Sharat (disambiguation)
- Sarat (disambiguation)
