= Sharda =

Sharda may refer to:

- Sharda (1942 film), a 1942 Indian Hindi-language film
- Sharda (1981 film), a 1981 Indian Hindi-language drama film
- Sharda (singer) (1933–2023), Indian playback singer in 1960s and 1970s Hindi films
- Sharda Tehsil, Neelum District, Azad Kashmir, Pakistan
- Sharda River, a Ghaghara-Ganga tributary that runs along the India–Nepal border
- Sharada script, a script used to write Kashmiri
- Sharda University, in Greater Noida, Uttar Pradesh, India
- A name of the Hindu goddesses Saraswati, Durga or Yogamaya
- Sharda Pandit, a fictional character portrayed by Bhasha Sumbli in the 2022 Indian film The Kashmir Files

== See also ==
- Sharada (disambiguation)
- Sharad (disambiguation)
- Sharla, a given name
