= Sharada =

Sharada (Sanskrit for "autumnal") may refer to:

- the season spanning the months of Bhadrapada, Ashvin, and Kārtika of the traditional lunar Hindu calendar
- Another name for the Hindu goddess Saraswati
- Sharada script, abugida writing system
- Sharada (Unicode block), a Unicode block of Sharada script characters

== Geography ==
- Sharda River, downstream renaming mainly in Uttar Pradesh of (Maha)Kali River on Nepal's western border with Uttarakhand, India
- Sharad Khola tributary to Babai River, Dang and Bardiya districts, Nepal

== Films ==
- Sharada (1942 film), in Hindi
- Sharada (1957 film), in Hindi
- Sharada (1981 film), in Hindi

== Literature ==
- Sharada (magazine), a Nepali literary magazine
- Sharada (Malayalam women's magazine), an Indian magazine in Malayalam language

== People ==
- Nerella Sharada, Indian politician
- Princess Sharada Shah of Nepal (1943-2001), princess of Nepal
- Sharada Sharma, poet and writer
- Sarada, Indian film actress

== Other ==
- Sharada Peeth, a temple in Sharda, Kashmir
- "Sharada", a song by Skye Sweetnam on her album Noise from the Basement

== See also ==
- Sarada (disambiguation)
- Sharda (disambiguation)
- Sharad (disambiguation)
