= Bo Fuzhun =

- Majestic Sovereign
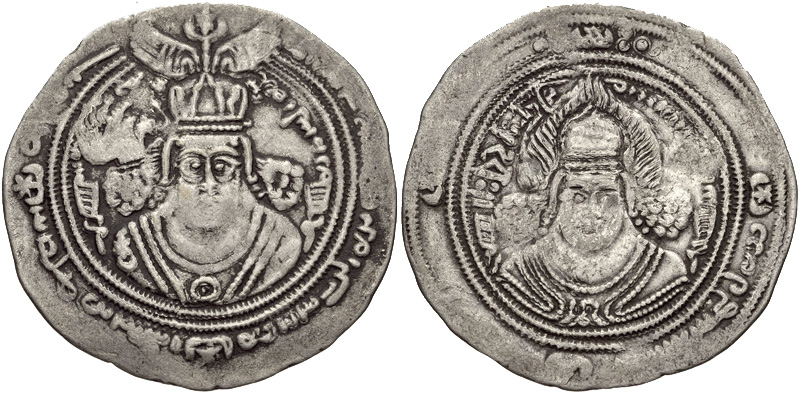
- Possible coinage of Bo Fuzhun.

Turk Shahi King
- Reign: 745-? CE
- Predecessor: Fromo Kesaro
- Successor: Possibly Khingal
- Father: Fromo Kesaro

Approximate location of the Turk Shahis

Bo Fuzhun, also Bofuzhun (Chinese language: 勃匐準 Bo-fu-zhun, ruled from 745 CE per Chinese sources) was a ruler of the Turk Shahis. He is only known in name from Chinese imperial accounts and possibly numismatic sources. The identification of his coinage remains conjectural.

== Chinese accounts ==
Bo Fuzhun appears in the Chinese annals of the Old Book of Tang, which record many dynastic events and ethnological information about the polities of Central and Southern Asia in the 6th-8th century, which were nominally under Chinese suzerainty and part of the Protectorate General to Pacify the West. According to the Old Book of Tang, in 745 CE, Fromo Kesaro, king of the Turk Shahis, sent a request to the Chinese court in order to abdicate in favour of his son Bo Fuzun. These events are again recorded in the Chinese annals Old Book of Tang and Tang Huiyao.

天寶四年，又冊其子勃匐準為襲罽賓及烏萇國王，仍授左驍衛將軍
In the 4th year of the Tianbao reign [745 CE] (Note: Tianbao (天寶, 742–756), era name used by Emperor Xuanzong of Tang) another imperial edict was issued to make his [ie Fromo Kesaro's] son Bo Fuzun succeed him on the throne as the King of Jibin and Uddiyana. He was conferred the title of "General of Left Stalwart Guard".

— Old Book of Tang, Book 198.

== Coinage ==
According to Kuwayama the coinage of Bo Fuzhun corresponds to the late Turk Shahi coinage marked "Śrī Vāsudeva", and designed in the style of the coinage of the Sasanian Emperor Khosrow II. These coins follow the design of the coin of Khosrow II (ruled 590-628) issued in his regnal years 26,27,36 and 37. "Vāsudeva" would be a regnal name that he adopted as he obtained the throne of Uddiyana (烏萇國).

== Relation with Khingal ==
There is a possibility that Khingal, a ruler of the Turk Shahis, is identical with the Bo Fuzhun.

== Sources ==
- "The Countenance of the other: The Coins of the Huns and Western Turks in Central Asia and India". Kunsthistorisches Museum. Archived from the original on 2020-11-25.
  - "The Countenance of the other: The Coins of the Huns and Western Turks in Central Asia and India" (PDF). Kunsthistorisches Museum (Press release).
- Alram, Michael (2014). "From the Sasanians to the Huns New Numismatic Evidence from the Hindu Kush". The Numismatic Chronicle. 174: 261–291. JSTOR 44710198. (registration required)
- Grenet, Frantz (2002). "Nēzak". Encyclopædia Iranica, online edition.
- Kuwayama, Shōshin (桑山正進) (1976s). "The Turki Śāhis and Relevant Brahmanical Sculptures in Afghanistan". East and West. 26 (3/4): 375–407. ISSN 0012-8376. JSTOR 29756318.
- Kuwayama, Shōshin (桑山正進) (1993s). "6-8 世紀 Kapisi-Kabul-Zabul の貨幣と發行者" (PDF). 東方學報 (in Japanese). 65: 371-430.
- Martin, Dan (2011). "Greek and Islamic Medicines' Historical Contact with Tibet". In Akasoy, Anna; Burnett, Charles; Yoeli-Tlalim, Ronit (eds.). Islam and Tibet: Interactions Along the Musk Routes. Farnham, Surrey: Ashgate Publishing. pp. 117–144. ISBN 978-0-7546-6956-2.
- Payne, Richard (2016). "The Making of Turan: The Fall and Transformation of the Iranian East in Late Antiquity". Journal of Late Antiquity. 9. Johns Hopkins University Press: 4–41. doi:10.1353/jla.2016.0011. S2CID 156673274.
- Rezakhani, Khodadad (2017). ReOrienting the Sasanians: East Iran in Late Antiquity. Edinburgh University Press. pp. 1–256. ISBN 9781474400305.
- Martin, Dan (2011). "Greek and Islamic Medicines' Historical Contact with Tibet". In Akasoy, Anna; Burnett, Charles; Yoeli-Tlalim, Ronit (eds.). Islam and Tibet: Interactions Along the Musk Routes. Farnham, Surrey: Ashgate Publishing. pp. 117–144. ISBN 978-0-7546-6956-2.

Preceded by Fromo Kesaro	Turk Shahis; 745-? CE	Succeeded by Possibly; Khingal
