= Khingala =

Ruler of the Turk Shahis (r. c. 775–785)

- The supreme lord, the Great King, the King of Kings, the Majestic Sovereign
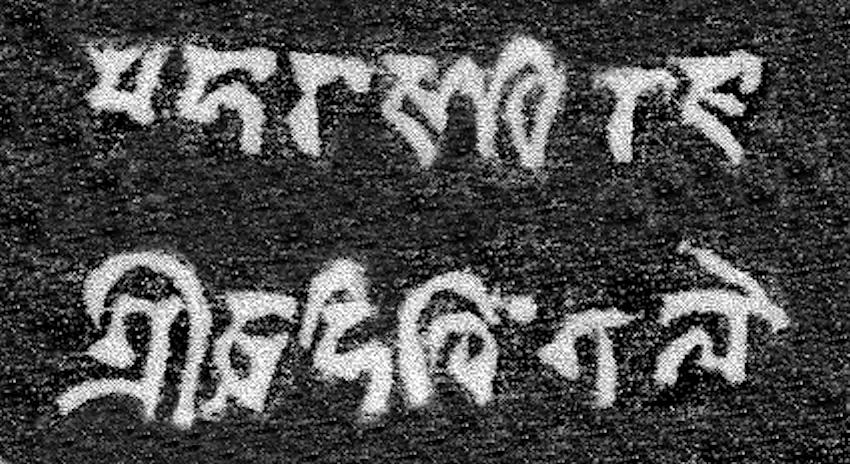
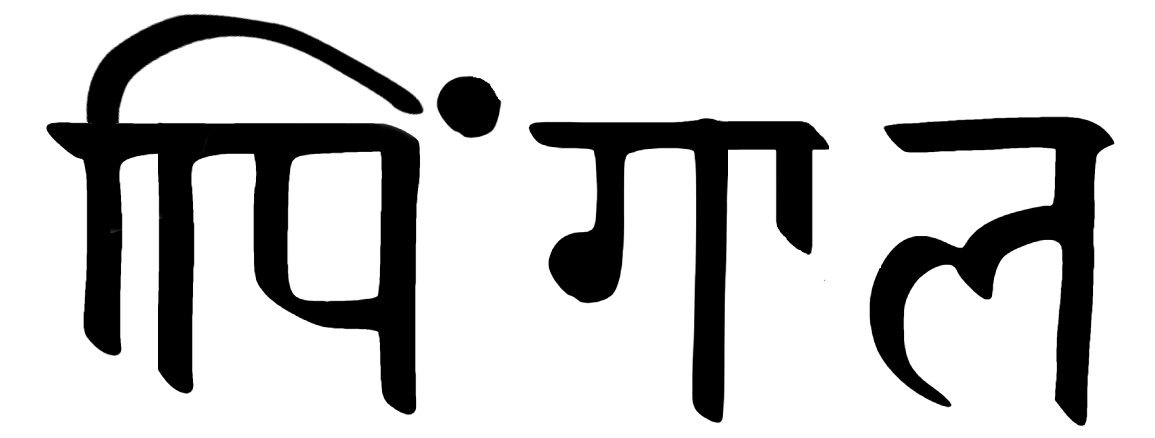
- Name and titles of Khingala ( khiṃ-gā-la) in the Gardez Ganesha inscription, in proto-Sharada script: Mahārājadhirāja śrī ṣāhi Khiṃgālau "The great king, the king of kings Sri Shahi Khimgala"

Turk Shahi King
- Reign: circa 775–785 CE
- Predecessor: Possibly Bo Fuzhun
- Successor: Possibly Langaturman

Approximate location of the Turk Shahis

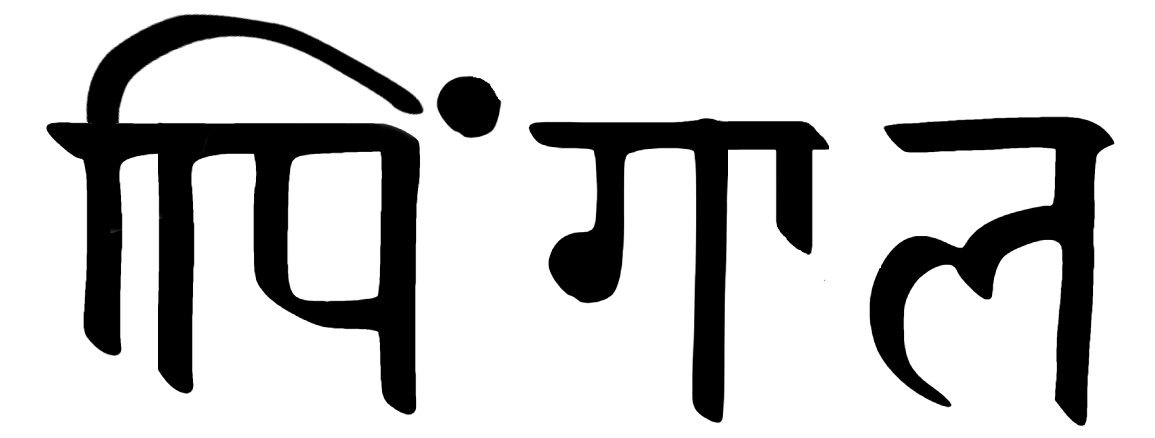
Khingala, also transliterated Khinkhil, Khinjil or Khinjal, (Sharada script: khiṃ-gā-la, ruled circa 775–785 CE) was a ruler of the Turk Shahis. He is only known in name from the accounts of the Muslim historian Ya'qubi and from an epigraphical source, the Gardez Ganesha. The identification of his coinage remains conjectural.

== Arabic accounts ==
The Muslim historian Ya'qubi (died 897/8) in his Ta'rikh ("History"), recounts that the third Abbasid Caliph Al-Mahdi (ruled 775–785 CE) asked for, and apparently obtained, the submission of various Central Asian rulers, including that of the Kabul Shah. Al-yaqubi seems to give the name of the Kabul Shah as "Ḥanḥal", but the reading is uncertain. But a later handwritten copy of the book is known to transcribe the name as "Khanjal". The original account by Ya'qubi reads:

Al-Mahdī sent messengers to the kings, calling on them to submit, and most of them submitted to him. Among them were the king of Kābul Shāh, whose name was Ḥanḥal; the king of Ṭabaristān, the Iṣbahbadh; the king of Soghdia, the Ikhshīd; the king of Tukhāristān, Sharwin; the king of Bamiyan, the Shīr; the king of Farghana, ------ ; the king of Usrūshana, Afshīn; the king of the Kharlukhiyya, Jabghūya; the king of Sijistān, Zunbīl; the king of Turks, Tarkhan; the king of Tibet, Ḥ-h-w-r-n; the king of Sind, al-Rāy; the king of China, Baghbür; the king of India and Atrāḥ, Wahūfūr; and the king of the Tughuz-ghuz, Khāqān.

— Ya'qubi (died 897/8), Ta'rikh ("History")

The name "Khanjal" has been variously reconstructed as "Khinkhil", "Khinjil" or "Khinjal", and is very similar to the name of an earlier Alchon Hun ruler named Khingila (5th century CE). According to historian Rezakhani, the name mentioned by Ya'qubi is "obviously a namesake" of Khingila.

== Epigraphy ==
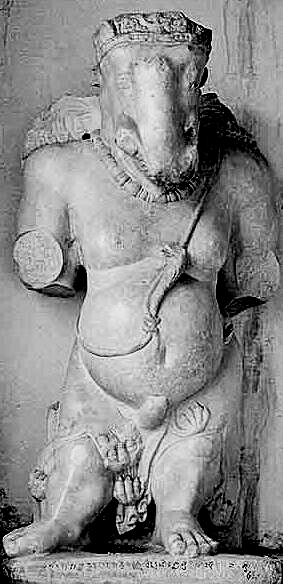
The Gardez Ganesha from Gardez, Afghanistan, was dedicated by Khiṃgāla.

The Gardez Ganesha is a statue of the Hindu god Ganesha, discovered in Gardez, near Kabul in Afghanistan. It is considered as "a typical product of the Indo-Afghan school". A dedicatory inscription appears on the base of the statue. It is written in the Siddhamatrika script, a development of the Brahmi script. An analysis of the writing suggests a date from the 6th or 8th century CE.

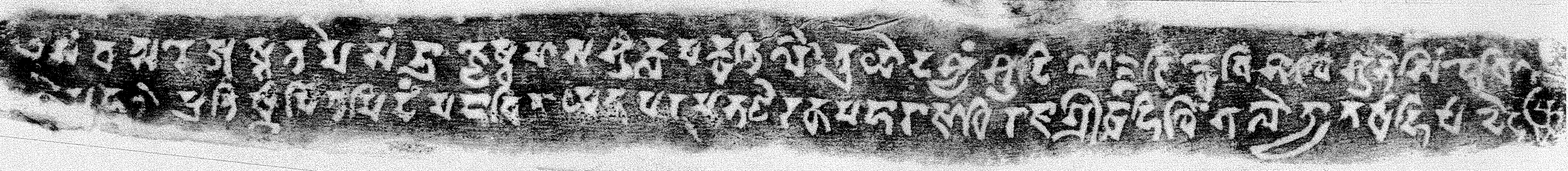

1. sarṃvatsare aṣṭatame saṃ 8 jyeṣṭha-māsa-śukla-pakṣa-tithau ttrayodaśyāṃ śu di 10-3 rikṣe viśākhe śubhe siṃhe[citra-]
2. [-ke] mahat pratiṣṭhāpitam idaṃ māha-vināyaka paramabhaṭṭeraka mahārājādhirāja-śri-ṣāhi-khiṃgālauḍyāna-ṣāhi-pādaiḥ.

On the thirteenth day of the bright half of the month of yestha, the [lunar] mansion being the Visakha, at the auspicious time when the zodiacal sign Lion was bright on the horizon (lagna), in the year eight, this great [image] of the Mahavinayaka was consecrated by the supreme lord, the great king, the king of the kings, the Sri Shahi Khiṃgāla, the king of Odyana..

— Inscription of the Ganesh Ganesha (Translation: Hideaki Nakatani).

The identity of this Khingala is uncertain. A famous Khingila is known from the dynasty of the Alchon Huns, and one of his coins has the legend "Deva Shahi Khingila" ( "God-King Khingila"), but he is dated quite earlier, to the 5th century CE.

Given the stylistically probable mid-8th century date for the Ganesha, the Śrī Ṣāhi Khiṃgāla of the inscription may have been identical with the Turk Shahi ruler of Kabul known in Arab sources as Khinkhil or Khinjil, who, according to Ya'qubi, gave his submission to Al-Mahdi in 775–785.

== Relation with Bo Fuzhun ==
There is a possibility that the Khinkhil of the Arabs is identical with the Turk Shahi Bo Fuzhun of the Chinese sources, which mention that he was the son of Fromo Kesaro and acceded to the throne precisely in 745 CE.

== Sources ==
- Alram, Michael; Filigenzi, Anna; Kinberger, Michaela; Nell, Daniel; Pfisterer, Matthias; Vondrovec, Klaus (2012–2013). "The Countenance of the other (The Coins of the Huns and Western Turks in Central Asia and India) 2012-2013 exhibit". Vienna, Austria: Kunsthistorisches Museum, Coin Cabinet. Archived from the original on 17 February 2021.
- Alram, Michael (2014). "From the Sasanians to the Huns New Numismatic Evidence from the Hindu Kush". The Numismatic Chronicle. 174: 261–291. JSTOR 44710198. (registration required)
- Grenet, Frantz (2002). "Nēzak". Encyclopædia Iranica, online edition.
- Kuwayama, Shōshin (桑山正進) (1976s). "The Turki Śāhis and Relevant Brahmanical Sculptures in Afghanistan". East and West. 26 (3/4): 375–407. ISSN 0012-8376. JSTOR 29756318.
- Kuwayama, Shōshin (桑山正進) (1993s). "6-8 世紀 Kapisi-Kabul-Zabul の貨幣と發行者" (PDF). 東方學報 (in Japanese). 65: 371-430.
- Martin, Dan (2011). "Greek and Islamic Medicines' Historical Contact with Tibet". In Akasoy, Anna; Burnett, Charles; Yoeli-Tlalim, Ronit (eds.). Islam and Tibet: Interactions Along the Musk Routes. Farnham, Surrey: Ashgate Publishing. pp. 117–144. ISBN 978-0-7546-6956-2.
- Payne, Richard (2016). "The Making of Turan: The Fall and Transformation of the Iranian East in Late Antiquity". Journal of Late Antiquity. 9. Johns Hopkins University Press: 4–41. doi:10.1353/jla.2016.0011. S2CID 156673274.
- Rezakhani, Khodadad (2017). ReOrienting the Sasanians: East Iran in Late Antiquity. Edinburgh University Press. pp. 1–256. ISBN 9781474400305.
- Martin, Dan (2011). "Greek and Islamic Medicines' Historical Contact with Tibet". In Akasoy, Anna; Burnett, Charles; Yoeli-Tlalim, Ronit (eds.). Islam and Tibet: Interactions Along the Musk Routes. Farnham, Surrey: Ashgate Publishing. pp. 117–144. ISBN 978-0-7546-6956-2.

Preceded by Possibly; Bo Fuzhun	Turk Shahis; 665-680 CE	Succeeded by Possibly; Langaturman
