= Gethu =

2016 Indian film by Krish Thirukumaran

- Directed by: Krish Thirukumaran
- Written by: Krish Thirukumaran
- Produced by: Udhayanidhi Stalin
- Starring: Udhayanidhi Stalin; Amy Jackson; Sathyaraj; Vikranth
- Cinematography: M. Sukumar
- Edited by: Dinesh Ponraj
- Music by: Harris Jayaraj
- Production company: Red Giant Movies
- Distributed by: Red Giant Movies
- Release date: 14 January 2016
- Running time: 118 minutes
- Country: India
- Language: Tamil

Gethu (transl. Swag) is a 2016 Indian Tamil-language action thriller film written and directed by Krish Thirukumaran. Produced by Udhayanidhi Stalin, the film features himself in the lead role along with Amy Jackson, Sathyaraj in a supporting role, and Vikranth as the main antagonist. Featuring music composed by Harris Jayaraj and cinematography by Sukumar, the film was released on 14 January 2016. It received mixed reviews. Critics praised the cinematography and music of the film but heavily criticized the screenplay and the misleading title of the film.

== Plot ==
The film opens with a renegade sniper named Craig, who assassinates an army officer from a long distance and is given a new assignment by a traitor to finish off an ISRO scientist named Abdul Kamaal within 30 days. The story then shifts to Kumily, where a PT teacher named Thulasi Raman leads a peaceful life with his son Sethu, wife, and daughter. Sethu, who works as a librarian to retired Colonel Matthews, meets a kleptomaniac named Nandhini, who steals books from the library. After a few altercations, the two fall in love. Craig, for some unknown reasons, lands in the hill town and is seen wandering and taking photographs of Matthews. Meanwhile, Thulasi Raman complaints about a political based bar owner named Kandhan, and in an ensuing fight, Sethu comes to his rescue by bashing up the goons. Mysteriously, the corpse of Kandhan is pulled out of a waterfall, and a ring belonging to Thulasi Raman is found in his hands. The police then arrests Thulasi Raman. Sethu takes it upon himself to clear his father's name and set out to find the real killer.

== Cast ==
- Udhayanidhi Stalin as Sethu Raman
- Sathyaraj as Thulasi Raman
- Amy Jackson as Nandhini Ramanujan
- Vikranth as Craig aka Bull
- Karunakaran as Kanagu
- Pragathi as Thulasi Raman's wife
- Rajesh as Colonel Matthews
- Sachu as Vathsala Sadagoppan
- Mime Gopi as Kandhan
- I. M. Vijayan as Rajendran
- Avinash as Craig's boss
- Anuradha as Kandhan's mother
- Vasu Vikram as Headmaster
- Uma as herself (guest appearance)
- Besant Ravi as Graveyard security
- Supergood Subramani as Police Inspector
- Aadukalam Naren as DSP (guest appearance)
- Sharad Haksar as Abdul Kamal (guest appearance)
- Sandy (guest appearance in the song "Mutta Bajji")
- Mahek Chahal in an item number in the song "Mutta Bajji"

== Production ==
In July 2014, Udhayanidhi Stalin revealed that he would collaborate with director Thirukumaran of Maan Karate (2014) fame for his next production. Gethu was revealed to be the title in September 2014, with Harris Jayaraj and Sukumar signed on as music composer and cinematographer respectively. Actor Vikranth, previously only seen in leading roles, signed on to appear in the film as an antagonist. Sathyaraj was chosen to play the father of Udhayanidhi's character and was given top billing in the credits. The film was revealed to be half complete by April 2015, and a first look poster was released to the public. The team began a second schedule in Kodaikanal later that month. Gethu also marks the first major appearance of Udhayanidhi in a non-comedy film. He stated that he chose to work on the film due to having grown bored of working in comedy films, and his desire to "experiment, try something different".

== Music ==
Gethu

Soundtrack album by Harris Jayaraj
- Released: 25 December 2015
- Recorded: 2015
- Genre: Feature film soundtrack
- Length: 22:19
- Language: Tamil
- Labels: Sony Music; Divo
- Producer: Harris Jayaraj

Harris Jayaraj chronology
Nannbenda (2015)	Gethu (2015)	Iru Mugan (2016)

The film's soundtrack album and background score was composed by Harris Jayaraj. The soundtrack album consists of five tracks, and Harris is collaborating with Udhayanidhi Stalin for the fourth time in this project. The music rights were purchased by Sony Music India & Divo. The soundtrack's track list was released by Red Giant Movies on 23 December 2015. The track list was unveiled on YouTube using an innovative motion poster technique. The album was released on 25 December 2015, coinciding with Christmas.

Track listing
No.	Title	Lyrics	Singer(s)	Length
1.	"Thillu Mullu"	V Padmavathy, Sirkali Sirpi, Gana Vinoth	Naresh Iyer, Ranina Reddy	6:02
2.	"Thaen Kaatru"	Thamarai	Haricharan, Shashaa Tirupati	5:06
3.	"Yevanda Ivan"	MC Vickey	MC Vickey, Sharmila	4:36
4.	"Adiyae Adiyae"	Thamarai	Karthik, Pop Shalini	3:23
5.	"Mutta Bajji"	Gana Vinoth, G Praba	Gana Vinoth, Anthony Daasan, Marana Gana Viji, Ebisa	3:12
Total length:				22:19

== Release ==
The film was released on 14 January 2016, coinciding with Pongal. The entertainment tax exemption request for the film was denied on the basis that the filmmakers misspelled the English title as "Gethu" instead of "Kethu", the latter being the correct transliteration of a Tamil word. Government officials argued that since films released using Tamil words are entitled to an entertainment tax, and that "Gethu" is not a Tamil word, the film would not be entitled to an exemption. The matter was heard by the Madras State Court, which ruled that the film was entitled to the entertainment tax exemption.

== Critical reception ==
M Suganth of The Times of India rated it 2.5 out of 5, commenting, "Thirukumaran has the essentials for a high-concept thriller — a determined hitman, an ordinary man who stumbles into a nefarious plot by accident, a sub-plot that provides some mystery, and a bit of family drama. It is in his execution that he falters. For a thriller clocking in at under two hours, Gethu moves at a pace that is as sleepy as the hill station where the action happens. The director's choice of slow motion shots as a device to make the action stylish and prolong the tension in the plot works against the film." Sudhir Srinivasan of The Hindu stated, "The whole movie bears the flavour of a short-story adaptation, and at a little over two hours, there isn't too much duration in which to flood the story with masala elements and thoroughly destroy it, although, to its discredit, Gethu certainly does try." S Saraswathi critic of Rediff.com gave 2 stars out of 5 and stated that "Director Thirukumaran’s Gethu fails to live up to its interesting premise; the film is all show and no substance.". Samayam critic gave 2.5 stars out of 5. A critic from Dinamalar noted that the film was a decent watch. Ananda Vikatan gave a mixed review.
