= Sarat =

Sarat may refer to:

== People ==
- Sarat Chandra (disambiguation), the given names of several people
- Archana Sarat, Indian author
- Austin Sarat (born 1947), American lawyer and academic
- Sarat Kumar Rai or Kumar Saratkumar Rai (1876–1946), a member of the royal family of Dighapatia
- Sarat Kumar Ghosh (1878-1962), an Indian civil servant
- Sarat Kumar Kar (born 1939), an Indian politician

== Other uses ==
- Sharad, or Śarat or Sharat, the early autumn season in the Hindu calendar
- Sarat, a protagonist in American War (novel)

== See also ==
- Sharat (disambiguation)
- Sharad (disambiguation)
- Sarath (disambiguation)
- Sarratt (disambiguation)
- Sarrat, a municipality in Ilocos Norte, Philippines
