= Sarath =

Sarath may refer to:

== People ==
- R. Sarath, Indian film director and Screenwriter.
- Sarath (composer) or Sharreth (born 1969), Indian film composer
- Sarath Babu (born 1951), Indian film actor
- Sarath Das (born 1978), Indian film actor
- Sarath Fonseka (born 1950), Sri Lankan military leader
- R. Sarathkumar (born 1954), Indian film actor, journalist and politician
- Sarath Ranawaka (1951–2009), Member of the Parliament of Sri Lanka
- Sarath N. Silva, former Chief Justice of the Supreme Court of Sri Lanka
- Sarath Kumara Gunaratna, Sri Lankan politician and former minister
- Sarath Weerasekara (born 1951), Sri Lankan politician, admiral and former deputy minister
- Sarath Amunugama, Sri Lankan academic
- Sarath Amunugama (politician) (born 1939), Sri Lankan civil servant, politician, and minister
- Sarath Kumar (actor) (1991–2015), Indian television actor

== Places ==
- Sarath, Deoghar, a community development block in Jharkhand, India
- Sarath, Deoghar (village), a village in Jharkhand, India
- Sarath (Vidhan Sabha constituency)

== See also ==
- Sarat (disambiguation)
