= Sharad Kumar =

Sharad Kumar may refer to

- Sharad Kumar (athlete), Indian para high jumper
- Sharad Kumar (bureaucrat), chief of National Investigation Agency
- Sharad Chauhan, also known as Sharad Kumar, member of Legislative Assembly of Delhi
- Sharad Kumar Dixit, American plastic surgeon, Padma Shri awardee
