= Gardez Ganesha =

Afghan statue of the Hindu god Ganesha

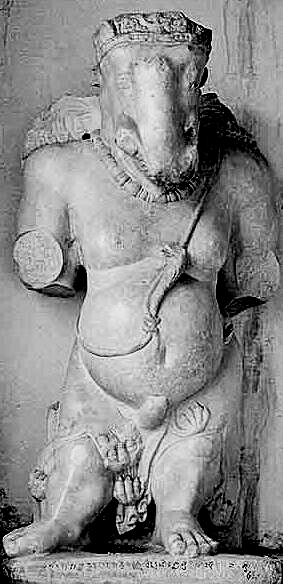
- The Ganesha from Gardez, Afghanistan.
- Material: Marble
- Size: 24 inches high x 14 inches wide
- Created: 7th-8th century CE
- Discovered: Gardez; 34.525278°N 69.178333°E
- Present location: Dargha Pir Rattan Nath temple, Kabul

Location

The Gardez Ganesha is a statue of the Hindu god Ganesha, discovered in Gardez, near Kabul in Afghanistan. It is considered "a typical product of the Indo-Afghan school". It was dedicated by a king named Khingal.

== Temporality ==
D.C. Sircar has dated the statue to the 6th-7th century CE, and more precisely 7th century CE based on the palaeography of the inscription on its base. Some authors have attributed the statue to the transitional period between Kushan art to Gupta art, to the 5th or even 4th-century CE. The statue of Ganesha from Gardez is now attributed to the period of Turk Shahis in the 7-8th century CE, rather than to their successors the Hindu Shahis (9th-10th century) as formerly suggested. The datation is essentially based on stylistic analysis, as the displays great iconographical and stylistic similarities with the works of the Buddhist monastery of Fondukistan, which is also dated to the same period.

The statue of Ganesha is also considered contemporary to the famous Hindu statue of Surya in tunic and boots discovered in Khair Khaneh near Kabul, also attributed to the Turk Shahis in the 7-8th century CE. Archaeologically, the construction of the Khair Khaneh temple itself is now dated to 608-630 CE, at the beginning of the Turk Shahis period. Brahmanism seems to have flourished to some extent under the Turk Shahis, who were primarily supporters of Buddhism, with various works of art also attributed to their period of the 7-8th century CE.

After its discovery in Gardez, the statue was transferred to the Hindu temple of Dargah Pir Rattan Nath in Kabul, near the Pamir Cinema.

== Inscription ==
The inscription appears on the base of the statue. It is written in the Siddhamatrika script, a development of the Brahmi script, or in proto-Sharada script: An analysis of the writing suggests a date from the 6th or 8th century CE.

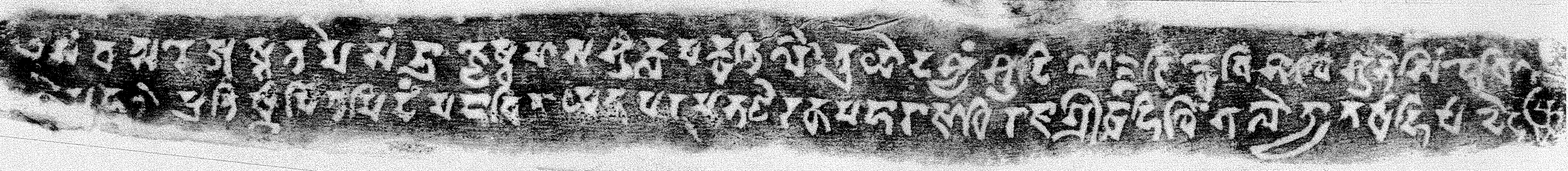

1. sarṃvatsare aṣṭatame saṃ 8 jyeṣṭha-māsa-śukla-pakṣa-tithau ttrayodaśyāṃ śu di 10-3 rikṣe viśākhe śubhe siṃhe[citra-]
2. [-ke] mahat pratiṣṭhāpitam idaṃ māha-vināyaka paramabhaṭṭeraka mahārājādhirāja-śri-ṣāhi-khiṃgālauḍyāna-ṣāhi-pādaiḥ.

On the thirteenth day of the bright half of the month of Jyestha, the [lunar] mansion being the Visakha, at the auspicious time when the zodiacal sign Lion was bright on the horizon (lagna), in the year eight, this great [image] of the Mahavinayaka was consecrated by the supreme lord, the great king, the king of the kings, the Sri Shahi Khiṃgāla, the king of Odyana..

— Inscription of the Ganesh Ganesha (Translation: Hideaki Nakatani).

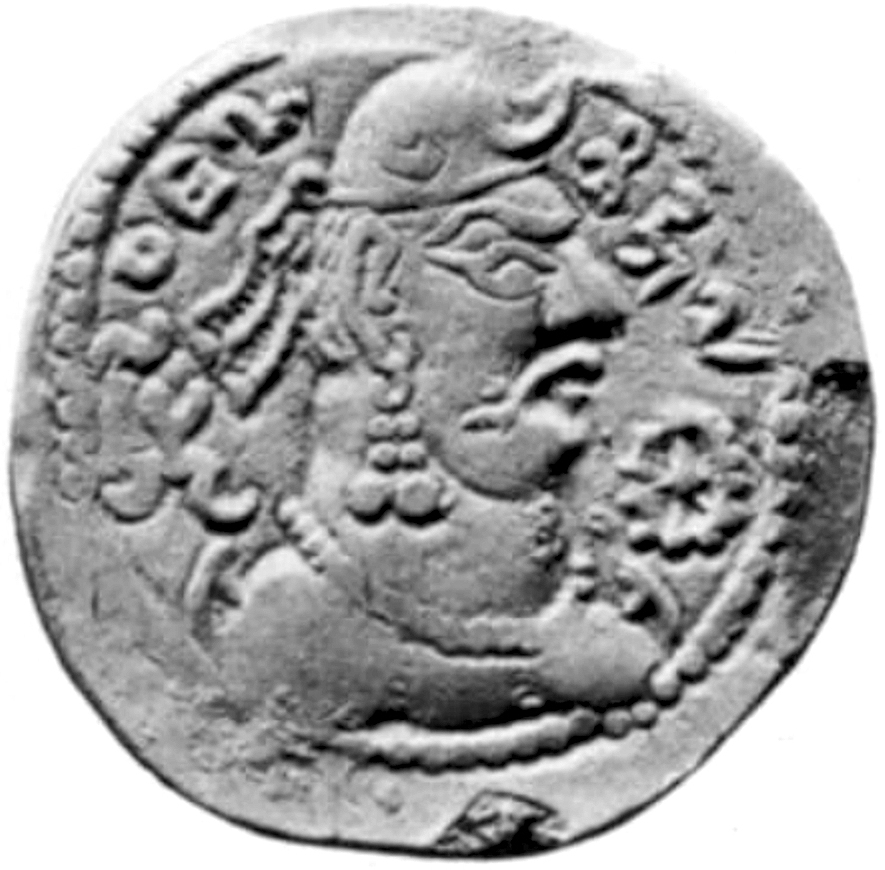
A coin of Khingila with the title Deva Shahi Kinghila ( "God-King Khingila"), 440-490 CE

The identity of this Khingala is uncertain. A famous Khingila is known from the dynasty of the Alchon Huns, and one of his coins has the legend "Deva Shahi Khingila" ( "God-King Khingila"), but he is dated quite earlier, to the 5th-century CE.

=== 8th century Turk Shahi ruler Khingala ===
Given the stylistically probable mid-8th century date for the Ganesha, the Śrī Ṣāhi Khiṃgāla of the inscription may have been identical with the Turk Shahi ruler of Kabul known in Arab sources as Khinkhil or Khingala, who, according to Al-Yakubhi, gave his submission to Al-Mahdi in 775–785. The Khinkhil of the Arabs may also be identical with the Turk Shahi Bo Fuzhun (勃匐準) of the Chinese sources, which mention that he was the son of Fromo Kesaro and acceded to the throne precisely in 745 CE.

== See also ==
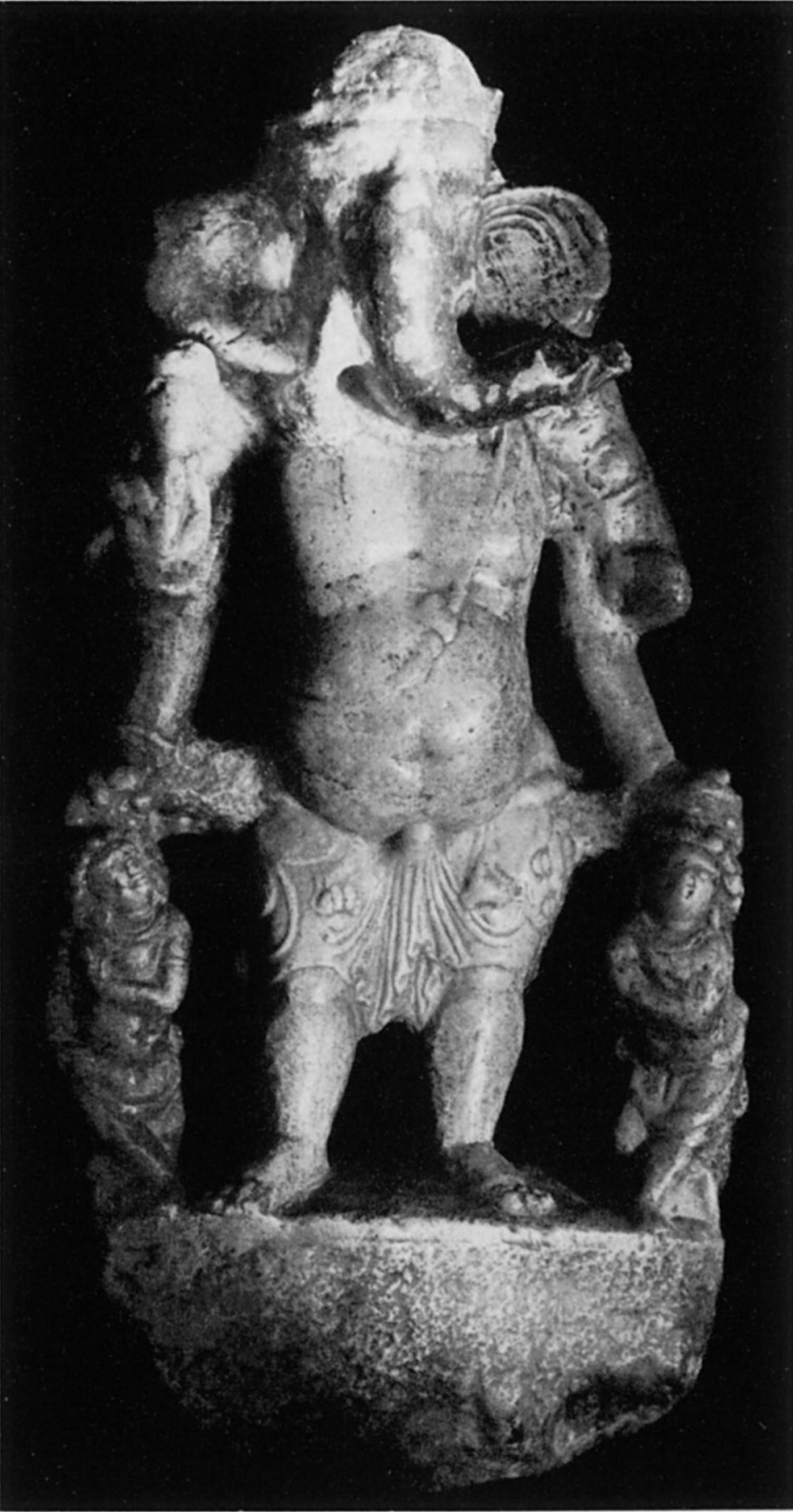
A similar white marble Ganesha, excavated in Sakar Darah near Kabul, circa 7th century CE.

- Khair Khaneh
