= Sharat =

Sharat may refer to:

- Al-Sharat, a region in Jordan and Saudi Arabia
- Sharada (season), a season in India
- Šarat, the name of a gufna (heavenly grapevine) in Mandaeism
- Sharat, an Indian given name (for a list of people, see)

== See also ==
- Sarat (disambiguation)
- Sharad (disambiguation)
