= Sarada =

Sarada may refer to:

- Saraswati, a Hindu goddess
- Sarada River in Andhra Pradesh, India
- Sarada (1962 film), in Tamil
- Sarada (1973 film), in Telugu
- Sarada (novel), an 1892 Malayalam novel
- Sarada (actress) (born 1945), Indian actress
- Sarada Devi or Sarada Ma (1853–1920), wife and spiritual counterpart of Hindu mystic Ramakrishna Paramahamsa
- Sarada Uchiha (うちは サラダ), a main character in the manga and anime series Boruto: Naruto Next Generations

== See also ==
- Sharada (disambiguation)
