= Sharada Supplement =

- Range: U+11B60..U+11B7F (32 code points)
- Plane: SMP
- Scripts: Sharada
- Assigned: 8 code points
- Unused: 24 reserved code points

Unicode version history
- 17.0 (2025): 8 (+8)

Unicode documentation
- Code chart ∣ Web page

Sharada Supplement is a Unicode block containing Kashmiri-specific vowels for contemporary use with Sharada script.

== Block ==
Sharada Supplement^{[1]}^{[2]} Official Unicode Consortium code chart (PDF)
	0	1	2	3	4	5	6	7	8	9	A	B	C	D	E	F
U+11B6x	𑭠	𑭡	𑭢	𑭣	𑭤	𑭥	𑭦	𑭧								
U+11B7x																
Notes: 1. As of Unicode version 17.0; 2. Grey areas indicate non-assigned code points

== History ==
The following Unicode-related documents record the purpose and process of defining specific characters in the Sharada Supplement block:

Version	Final code points (Note: Proposed code points and characters names may differ from final code points and names)	Count	L2 ID	Document
17.0	U+11B60..11B67	8	L2/23-122	Rajan, Vinodh (2023-05-05), Proposal to Encode Kashmiri Sharada Characters
17.0	U+11B60..11B67	8	L2/23-164	Anderson, Deborah; Kučera, Jan; Whistler, Ken; Pournader, Roozbeh; Constable, Peter (2023-07-21), "6 Sharada", Recommendations to UTC #176 July 2023 on Script Proposals
17.0	U+11B60..11B67	8	L2/23-157	Constable, Peter (2023-07-31), "Consensus 176-C34", UTC #176 Minutes

== See also ==
- Sharada (Unicode block)
