= Sharada (Unicode block) =

- Range: U+11180..U+111DF (96 code points)
- Plane: SMP
- Scripts: Sharada
- Major alphabets: Kashmiri; Sanskrit
- Assigned: 96 code points
- Unused: 0 reserved code points

Unicode version history
- 6.1 (2012): 83 (+83)
- 7.0 (2014): 85 (+2)
- 8.0 (2015): 94 (+9)
- 13.0 (2020): 96 (+2)

Unicode documentation
- Code chart ∣ Web page

Sharada is a Unicode block containing historic characters for writing Kashmiri, Sanskrit, and other languages of the northern Indian subcontinent in the 8th to 20th centuries.

== Block ==
Sharada^{[1]} Official Unicode Consortium code chart (PDF)
	0	1	2	3	4	5	6	7	8	9	A	B	C	D	E	F
U+1118x	𑆀	𑆁	𑆂	𑆃	𑆄	𑆅	𑆆	𑆇	𑆈	𑆉	𑆊	𑆋	𑆌	𑆍	𑆎	𑆏
U+1119x	𑆐	𑆑	𑆒	𑆓	𑆔	𑆕	𑆖	𑆗	𑆘	𑆙	𑆚	𑆛	𑆜	𑆝	𑆞	𑆟
U+111Ax	𑆠	𑆡	𑆢	𑆣	𑆤	𑆥	𑆦	𑆧	𑆨	𑆩	𑆪	𑆫	𑆬	𑆭	𑆮	𑆯
U+111Bx	𑆰	𑆱	𑆲	𑆳	𑆴	𑆵	𑆶	𑆷	𑆸	𑆹	𑆺	𑆻	𑆼	𑆽	𑆾	𑆿
U+111Cx	𑇀	𑇁	𑇂	𑇃	𑇄	𑇅	𑇆	𑇇	𑇈	𑇉	𑇊	𑇋	𑇌	𑇍	𑇎	𑇏
U+111Dx	𑇐	𑇑	𑇒	𑇓	𑇔	𑇕	𑇖	𑇗	𑇘	𑇙	𑇚	𑇛	𑇜	𑇝	𑇞	𑇟
Notes: 1. As of Unicode version 16.0

== History ==
The following Unicode-related documents record the purpose and process of defining specific characters in the Sharada block:

Version	Final code points (Note: Proposed code points and characters names may differ from final code points and names)	Count	L2 ID	WG2 ID	Document
6.1	U+11180..111C8, 111D0..111D9	83	L2/05-377	N3245	Pandey, Anshuman (2005-11-21), Request to Allocate the Sharada Script in the Unicode Roadmap
6.1	U+11180..111C8, 111D0..111D9	83	L2/08-017		Pandey, Anshuman (2008-01-18), Draft Proposal to Encode the Sharada Script in ISO/IEC 10646
6.1	U+11180..111C8, 111D0..111D9	83	L2/08-200		Pandey, Anshuman (2008-05-05), Draft Proposal to Encode the Sharada Script in ISO/IEC 10646
6.1	U+11180..111C8, 111D0..111D9	83	L2/09-104		Moore, Lisa (2009-05-20), "E.3", UTC #119 / L2 #216 Minutes
6.1	U+11180..111C8, 111D0..111D9	83	L2/09-074R2	N3595	Pandey, Anshuman (2009-08-05), Proposal to encode the Sharada Script in ISO/IEC 10646
6.1	U+11180..111C8, 111D0..111D9	83		N3703 (pdf, doc)	Umamaheswaran, V. S. (2010-04-13), "M55.27", Unconfirmed minutes of WG 2 meeting no. 55, Tokyo 2009-10-26/30
6.1	U+11180..111C8, 111D0..111D9	83	L2/10-330R		Sharma, Shriramana (2010-09-14), Concerning the Brahmi and Sharada characters for jihvamuliya and upadhmaniya
6.1	U+11180..111C8, 111D0..111D9	83	L2/10-440		Anderson, Deborah; McGowan, Rick; Whistler, Ken (2010-10-27), "4. Jihvamuliya and Upadhmaniya characters in Brahmi and Sharada", Review of Indic-related L2 documents and Recommendations to the UTC
6.1	U+11180..111C8, 111D0..111D9	83	L2/11-308		Sharma, Shriramana (2011-07-28), A clear policy on encoding OM characters
6.1	U+11180..111C8, 111D0..111D9	83	L2/12-019		Sharma, Shriramana (2012-01-12), Recommendation against use of 111C4 SHARADA OM for now
6.1	U+11180..111C8, 111D0..111D9	83	L2/12-028		Anderson, Deborah (2012-01-23), Representation of JIHVAMULIYA and UPADHMANIYA in Sharada
6.1	U+11180..111C8, 111D0..111D9	83	L2/12-031		Anderson, Deborah; McGowan, Rick; Whistler, Ken (2012-01-27), "2. SHARADA OM, 3. SHARADA JIHVAMULIYA and UPADHMANIY", Review of Indic-related L2 documents and Recommendations to the UTC
6.1	U+11180..111C8, 111D0..111D9	83	L2/12-224		Sharma, Shriramana (2012-07-06), Annotation for 111C4 SHARADA OM
6.1	U+11180..111C8, 111D0..111D9	83	L2/12-267		Anderson, Deborah; McGowan, Rick; Whistler, Ken (2012-07-21), "VII. SHARADA", Review of Indic-related documents and Recommendations to the UTC
6.1	U+11180..111C8, 111D0..111D9	83	L2/13-028		Anderson, Deborah; McGowan, Rick; Whistler, Ken; Pournader, Roozbeh (2013-01-28), "18", Recommendations to UTC on Script Proposals
6.1	U+11180..111C8, 111D0..111D9	83	L2/13-074	N4417	Pandey, Anshuman (2013-04-25), Request to reallocate some recently-approved Sharada characters
6.1	U+11180..111C8, 111D0..111D9	83	L2/15-183R		Pournader, Roozbeh (2015-07-28), Candidate characters for Grapheme_Cluster_Break=Prepend
6.1	U+11180..111C8, 111D0..111D9	83	L2/15-187		Moore, Lisa (2015-08-11), "Consensus 144-C6", UTC #144 Minutes, "Change the Grapheme_Cluster_Break property of the 12 characters listed in L2/15-183R to "Prepend" for Unicode 9.0."
6.1	U+11180..111C8, 111D0..111D9	83	L2/15-255		A, Srinidhi; A, Sridatta (2015-10-23), Request to change the representative glyph of Sharada Vowel Signs Vocalic L and Vocalic LL
6.1	U+11180..111C8, 111D0..111D9	83	L2/16-004		Moore, Lisa (2016-02-01), "D.3", UTC #146 Minutes
7.0	U+111CD	1	L2/12-171R	N4269	Pandey, Anshuman (2012-05-03), Proposal to encode the SUTRA MARK for Sharada
7.0	U+111CD	1	L2/12-112		Moore, Lisa (2012-05-17), "D.4.2", UTC #131 / L2 #228 Minutes
7.0	U+111CD	1	L2/12-291		Pandey, Anshuman (2012-08-01), Request for name change for U+111CD SHARADA SUTRA MARK
7.0	U+111DA	1	L2/11-430R	N4158	Pandey, Anshuman (2011-11-02), Proposal to Encode the Sign EKAM for Sharada
7.0	U+111DA	1	L2/12-031		Anderson, Deborah; McGowan, Rick; Whistler, Ken (2012-01-27), "1. SHARADA EKAM", Review of Indic-related L2 documents and Recommendations to the UTC
7.0	U+111DA	1	L2/12-007		Moore, Lisa (2012-02-14), "D.4.2", UTC #130 / L2 #227 Minutes
7.0	U+111DA	1	L2/12-285		Pandey, Anshuman (2012-07-29), Proposal to Reallocate Sharada EKAM
7.0	U+111DA	1	L2/12-216R		Anderson, Deborah (2012-08-01), Annotation for SHARADA EKAM in nameslist
7.0	U+111DA	1	L2/12-239		Moore, Lisa (2012-08-14), "Consensus 132-C17", UTC #132 Minutes, "Move Sharada Ekam from U+111C9 to U+111DA."
7.0	U+111DA	1		N4253 (pdf, doc)	"M59.16a", Unconfirmed minutes of WG 2 meeting 59, 2012-09-12
8.0	U+111C9	1	L2/12-322	N4330	Pandey, Anshuman (2012-09-27), Proposal to encode the SANDHI MARK for Sharada
8.0	U+111C9	1	L2/12-343R2		Moore, Lisa (2012-12-04), "Consensus 133-C14", UTC #133 Minutes
8.0	U+111C9	1		N4353 (pdf, doc)	"M60.15d", Unconfirmed minutes of WG 2 meeting 60, 2013-05-23
8.0	U+111C9	1	L2/17-247		Whistler, Ken; Iancu, Laurențiu (2017-07-26), Proposed Property Changes for U+111C9 SHARADA SANDHI MARK
8.0	U+111C9	1	L2/17-222		Moore, Lisa (2017-08-11), "Consensus 152-C5", UTC #152 Minutes, "Change the properties for U+111C9 SHARADA SANDHI MARK as documented in L2/17-247, for Unicode 11.0."
8.0	U+111CA..111CC	3	L2/12-147		Anderson, Deborah; McGowan, Rick; Whistler, Ken (2012-04-25), "IX. SHARADA", Review of Indic-related L2 documents and Recommendations to the UTC
8.0	U+111CA..111CC	3	L2/12-239		Moore, Lisa (2012-08-14), "D.4.4", UTC #132 Minutes
8.0	U+111CA..111CC	3	L2/12-124R	N4265	Pandey, Anshuman (2012-08-29), Proposal to Encode Signs for Writing Kashmiri in Sharada
8.0	U+111CA..111CC	3		N4353 (pdf, doc)	"M60.15a", Unconfirmed minutes of WG 2 meeting 60, 2013-05-23
8.0	U+111DB	1	L2/12-318	N4331	Pandey, Anshuman (2012-09-27), Proposal to encode the sign SIDDHAM for Sharada
8.0	U+111DB	1	L2/12-343R2		Moore, Lisa (2012-12-04), "Consensus 133-C14", UTC #133 Minutes
8.0	U+111DB	1		N4353 (pdf, doc)	"M60.15c", Unconfirmed minutes of WG 2 meeting 60, 2013-05-23
8.0	U+111DB	1	L2/13-132		Moore, Lisa (2013-07-29), "Consensus 136-C14", UTC #136 Minutes, "Move characters..."
8.0	U+111DB	1		N4403 (pdf, doc)	Umamaheswaran, V. S. (2014-01-28), "9.2.1 Reallocating recently approved characters within the Sharada block", Unconfirmed minutes of WG 2 meeting 61, Holiday Inn, Vilnius, Lithuania; 2013-06-10/14
8.0	U+111DC	1	L2/12-324	N4337	Pandey, Anshuman (2012-09-29), Proposal to encode the HEADSTROKE for Sharada
8.0	U+111DC	1	L2/12-343R2		Moore, Lisa (2012-12-04), "Consensus 133-C14", UTC #133 Minutes
8.0	U+111DC	1		N4353 (pdf, doc)	"M60.15b", Unconfirmed minutes of WG 2 meeting 60, 2013-05-23
8.0	U+111DC	1	L2/13-132		Moore, Lisa (2013-07-29), "Consensus 136-C14", UTC #136 Minutes, "Move characters..."
8.0	U+111DC	1		N4403 (pdf, doc)	Umamaheswaran, V. S. (2014-01-28), "9.2.1 Reallocating recently approved characters within the Sharada block", Unconfirmed minutes of WG 2 meeting 61, Holiday Inn, Vilnius, Lithuania; 2013-06-10/14
8.0	U+111DD	1	L2/12-319	N4329 (pdf, doc)	Pandey, Anshuman (2012-09-27), Proposal to encode the CONTINUATION SIGN for Sharada
8.0	U+111DD	1	L2/12-343R2		Moore, Lisa (2012-12-04), "Consensus 133-C14", UTC #133 Minutes
8.0	U+111DD	1		N4353 (pdf, doc)	"M60.15e", Unconfirmed minutes of WG 2 meeting 60, 2013-05-23
8.0	U+111DD	1	L2/13-132		Moore, Lisa (2013-07-29), "Consensus 136-C14", UTC #136 Minutes, "Move characters..."
8.0	U+111DD	1		N4403 (pdf, doc)	Umamaheswaran, V. S. (2014-01-28), "9.2.1 Reallocating recently approved characters within the Sharada block", Unconfirmed minutes of WG 2 meeting 61, Holiday Inn, Vilnius, Lithuania; 2013-06-10/14
8.0	U+111DE..111DF	2	L2/12-325	N4338	Pandey, Anshuman (2012-09-30), Proposal to encode section marks for Sharada
8.0	U+111DE..111DF	2	L2/12-343R2		Moore, Lisa (2012-12-04), "Consensus 133-C14", UTC #133 Minutes
8.0	U+111DE..111DF	2		N4353 (pdf, doc)	"M60.15f", Unconfirmed minutes of WG 2 meeting 60, 2013-05-23
8.0	U+111DE..111DF	2	L2/13-132		Moore, Lisa (2013-07-29), "Consensus 136-C14", UTC #136 Minutes, "Move characters..."
8.0	U+111DE..111DF	2		N4403 (pdf, doc)	Umamaheswaran, V. S. (2014-01-28), "9.2.1 Reallocating recently approved characters within the Sharada block", Unconfirmed minutes of WG 2 meeting 61, Holiday Inn, Vilnius, Lithuania; 2013-06-10/14
13.0	U+111CE	1	L2/17-214R	N4931	A, Srinidhi; A, Sridatta (2017-10-13), Proposal to encode the Prishthamatra for Sharada
13.0	U+111CE	1	L2/17-255		Anderson, Deborah; Whistler, Ken; Pournader, Roozbeh; Moore, Lisa; Liang, Hai (2017-07-28), "10. Nandinagari", Recommendations to UTC #152 July-August 2017 on Script Proposals
13.0	U+111CE	1	L2/18-039		Anderson, Deborah; Whistler, Ken; Pournader, Roozbeh; Moore, Lisa; Liang, Hai; Cook, Richard (2018-01-19), "15. Nandinagari", Recommendations to UTC #154 January 2018 on Script Proposals
13.0	U+111CE	1	L2/18-115		Moore, Lisa (2018-05-09), "D.5.2", UTC #155 Minutes
13.0	U+111CE	1		N5020 (pdf, doc)	Umamaheswaran, V. S. (2019-01-11), "10.3.4", Unconfirmed minutes of WG 2 meeting 67
13.0	U+111CF	1	L2/17-428	N4930	Pandey, Anshuman (2017-12-14), Proposal to encode the INVERTED CANDRABINDU for Sharada
13.0	U+111CF	1	L2/18-039		Anderson, Deborah; Whistler, Ken; Pournader, Roozbeh; Moore, Lisa; Liang, Hai; Cook, Richard (2018-01-19), "b. INVERTED CANDRABINDU for Sharada", Recommendations to UTC #154 January 2018 on Script Proposals
13.0	U+111CF	1	L2/18-115		Moore, Lisa (2018-05-09), "D.15", UTC #155 Minutes
13.0	U+111CF	1		N5020 (pdf, doc)	Umamaheswaran, V. S. (2019-01-11), "10.3.3", Unconfirmed minutes of WG 2 meeting 67

== See also ==
- Sharada Supplement (Unicode block)
