= Fromo Kesaro =

King of the Turk Shahis

Fromo Kesaro ϕρoµo κησαρo "Rome Caesar"
- Majestic Sovereign
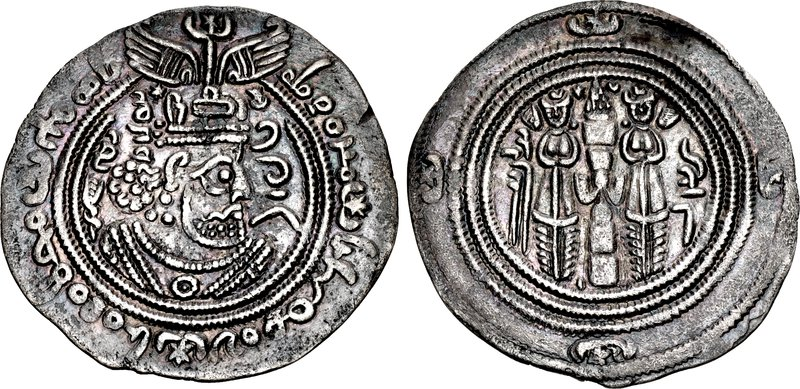
- Sasanian-style silver coin of Fromo Kesaro, circa 738-745 CE. Corrupted legend spwl in Pahlavi. In the outer margin in Bactrian: ϕρoµo κησαρo βαγo χoαδηo phromo kesaro zeoro bago xodeo "Fromo Kesaro, the Majestic Sovereign".

Turk Shahi King
- Reign: 739-745 CE
- Predecessor: Tegin Shah
- Successor: Bo Fuzhun

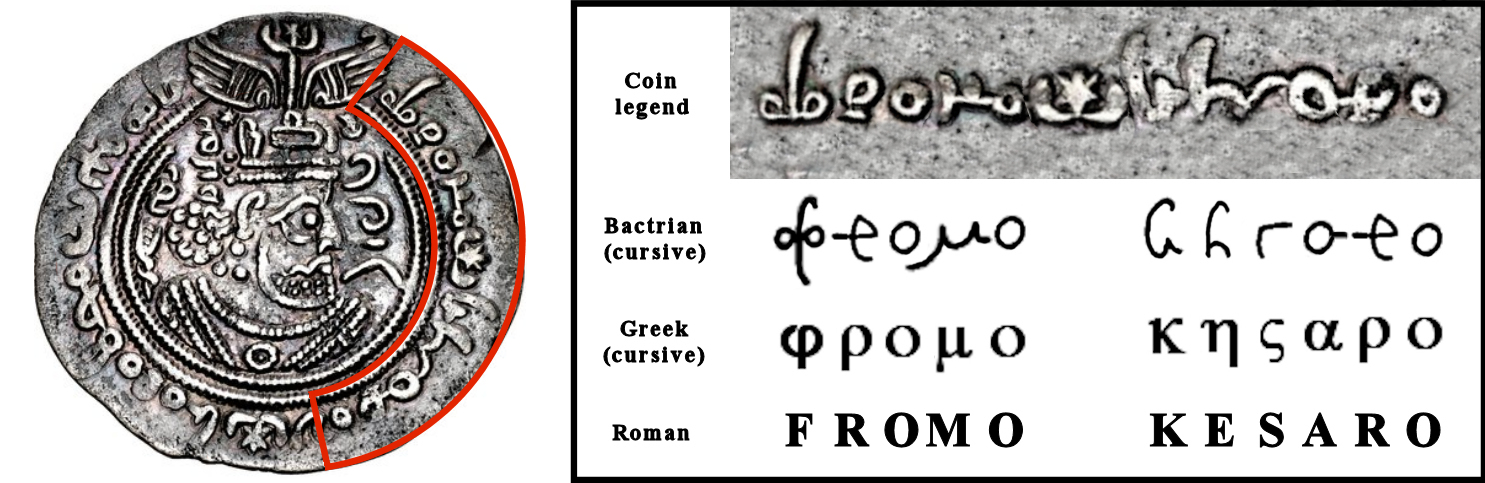
Bactrian script reading of "Fromo Kesaro" (ϕρoµo κησαρo, "Rome Caesar") on the coinage of the ruler, with Greek script and Latin script correspondence. The final "υ" after the name is the Greek genitive, i.e. "Of...".

Approximate location of the Turk Shahis

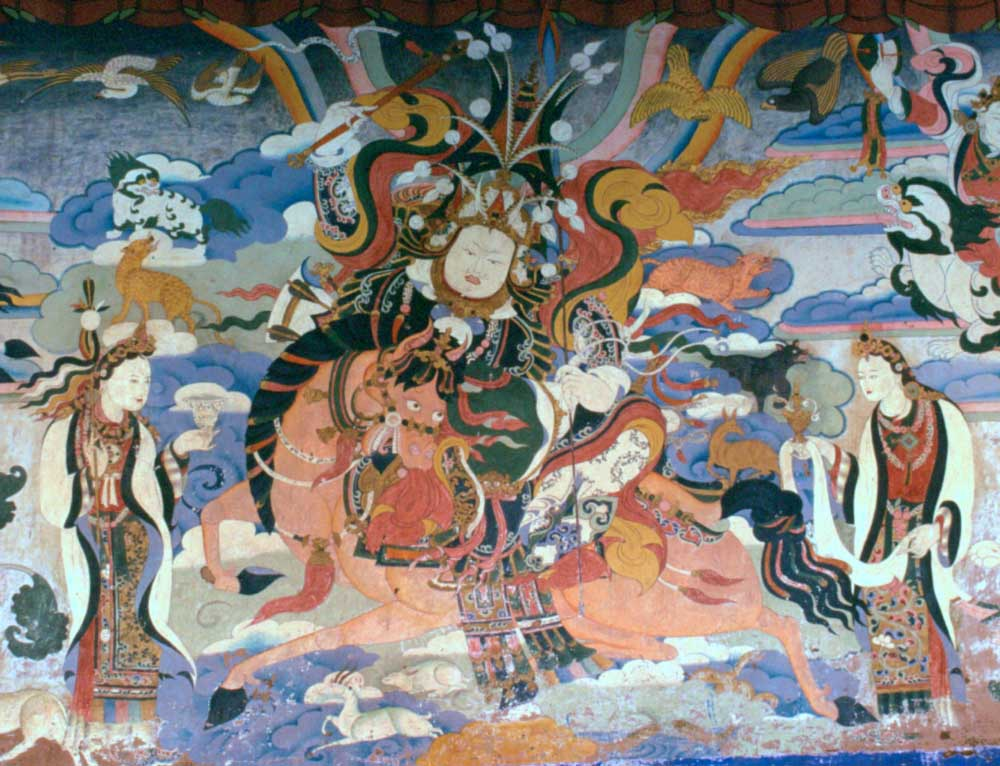
Fromo Kesaro in a mural depicting the Tibetan Epic of King Gesar.

Fromo or Phromo Kesaro (Bactrian script: ϕρoµo κησαρo, phonetical transcription of "Rome Caesar") was a king of the Turk Shahis (also known as the Kabul Shahis), a dynasty of Western Turk or mixed Western Turk-Hephthalite origin, who ruled from Kabul and Kapisa to Gandhara in the 7th to 9th centuries. In Chinese sources "Fromo Kesaro" was transcribed 拂菻罽娑 (pinyin: Fulin Jisuo; jyutping: fat1lam4 gai3so1), "Fulin" (拂菻) being the standard Tang dynasty name for "Byzantine Empire".

== Origin of the name "Rome Caesar" ==
From 719 CE, Tegin Shah was the king of the Turk Shahis. He then abdicated in 739 CE in favour of his son Fromo Kesaro. The name "Fromo Kesaro" was the probable phonetic transcription of "Rome Caesar" in honor of Caesar, the title of the then Eastern Roman Emperor Leo III the Isaurian who had defeated their common enemy the Arabs in 717 CE. (Note: Martin 2011, p. 127:"He received this laudatory epithet because he, like the Byzantines, was successful at holding back the Muslim conquerors.") Leo III the Isaurian then sent an embassy through Central Asia in 719 CE, which travelled as far as China. The Chinese annals record that "In the first month of the seventh year of the period Kaiyuan [719 CE] their Lord [拂菻王, "the King of Fulin"] sent the Ta-shou-ling [an officer of high rank] of T'u-huo-lo [吐火羅, Tokhara] (...) to offer lions and ling-yang [antelopes], two of each. A few months after, he further sent Ta-te-seng ["priests of great virtue"] to our court with tribute."

== Investiture of Fromo Kesaro in 738/739 CE ==
The Turk Shahis were nominally vassals of the Chinese Tang dynasty court and regularly sent embassies for official matters. In 738 CE, Tegin Shah sent a request to abdicate in favour of his son Fromo Kesaro. These events are recorded in the Chinese annals Cefu Yuangui.

In the 27th year [of Emperor Xuanzong i.e. 739 CE] the king Wusan Tele Sa [for Khorasan Tegin Shah] submitted a memorial requesting that due to his old age, his son Fulin Jipo [for Fulin Jisuo 拂菻罽娑] may succeed him on the throne. The Emperor agreed and dispatched an envoy to confer the King's title on him through an Imperial Edict.

— Cefu Yuangui, Vol. 964.

== Conflict with the Arabs ==
Kabulistan was the heartland of the Turk Shahi domain, which at times included Zabulistan and Gandhara. Some of their coins were minted in eastern Gandhara, in the Turk Shahi's winter capital of Hund (Udabhandapura). During their rule, the Turk Shahi were in constant conflict against the eastward expansion of the Abbasid Caliphate. Circa 650 CE, the Arabs attacked Shahi territory from the west, and captured Kabul. But the Turk Shahi were able to mount a counter-offensive and repulsed the Arabs, taking back the areas of Kabul and Zabulistan (around Ghazni), as well as the region of Arachosia as far as Kandahar. The Arabs again failed to capture Kabul and Zabulistan in 697-698 CE, and their general Yazid ibn Ziyad was killed in the action.

Fromo Kesaro appears to have fought vigorously against the Arabs. The Arabs are known to have been forced to pay tribute to Fromo Kesaro, since Sasanian coins and coins of Arab governors were overstruck on the rim with the following text in the Bactrian script describing his victory over the Arabs:

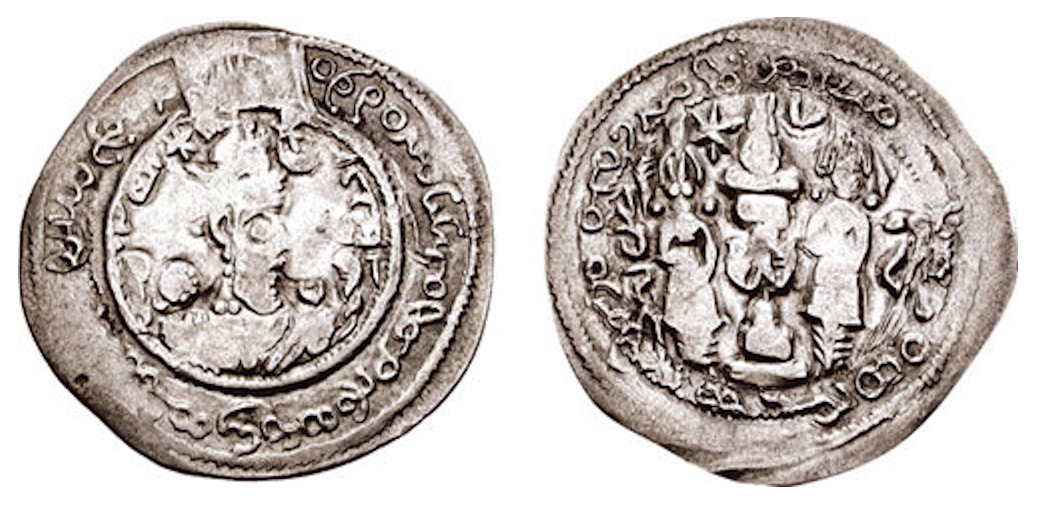
Sasanian drachm with Fromo Kesaro obverse and reverse rim overstrike in Bactrian.

Obverse: ϕρoµo κησαρo βαγo χoαδηo κιδo βo ταzικανo χoργo
Reverse:oδo σαo βo σαβαγo ατo ι µo βo γαινδo
Fromo Kesaro, the Majestic Sovereign, [is] who defeated the Arabs and laid a tax [on them]. Thus they sent it.

— Rim legend of Arab and Sasanian coins overstruck by Fromo Kesaro. (Note: The study of these new coins originally appeared in "New Coins of Fromo Kēsaro" by Helmut Humbach in: G. Pollet (ed.), "India and the Ancient World. History, trade and culture before A.D. 650". Professor P.H.L. Eggermont jubilee volume. Leuven 1987, 81-85, plates. XI-XIII)

The victories of Fromo Kesaro against the Arabs may have forged the Tibetan epic legend of King Phrom Ge-sar.

== Succession ==
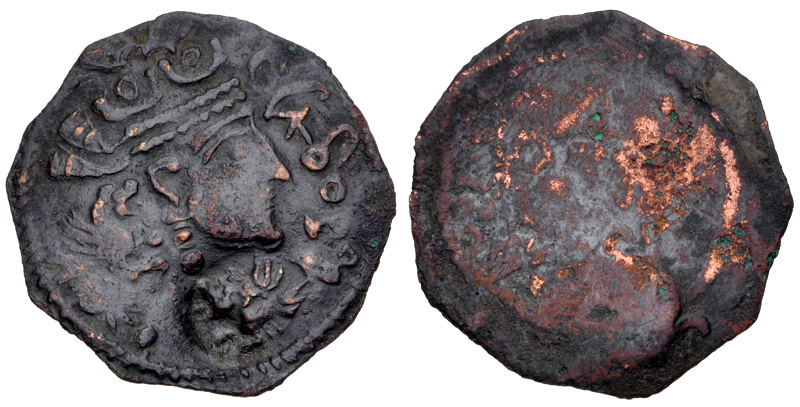
Base metal (Æ) drachm of Phromo Kesaro, circa 738-745 CE. The legend in front reads ζηβoρo (intended κησαρo, kesaro "Caesar".)

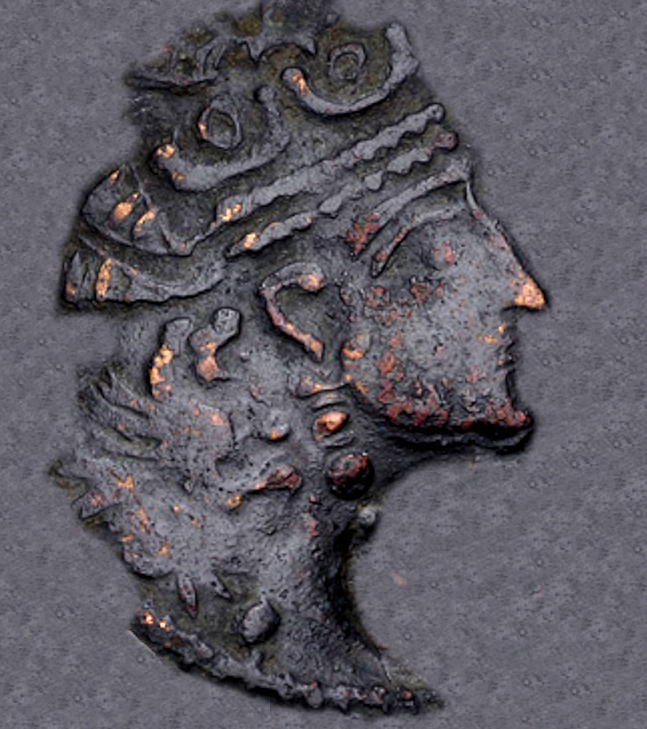
Profile from coinage.

In 745 CE, Fromo Kesaro sent a request to the Chinese court in order to abdicate in favour of his son Bo Fuzhun (his name is only known from Chinese sources). These events are again recorded in the Chinese annals Old Book of Tang and Tang Huiyao.

In the 4th year of the Tianbao reign [745 CE] (Note: Tianbao (天寶, 742–756), era name used by Emperor Xuanzong of Tang) another imperial edict was issued to make his [Fromo Kesar's] son Bo Fuzun succeed him on the throne as the King of Jibin and Wuchang. He was conferred the title of "General of Left Stalwart Guard".

— Old Book of Tang, Book 198.

The Turk Shahis eventually weakened against the Arabs in the late 9th century CE. Kandahar, Kabul and Zabul were lost to the Arabs, while in Gandhara the Hindu Shahi took over. The last Shahi ruler of Kabul, Lagaturman, was deposed by a Brahmin minister, possibly named Vakkadeva, in c. 850, signaling the end of the Buddhist Turk Shahi dynasty, and the beginning of the Hindu Shahi dynasty of Kabul.

== Sources ==
- Martin, Dan (2011). "Greek and Islamic Medicines' Historical Contact with Tibet". In Akasoy, Anna; Burnett, Charles; Yoeli-Tlalim, Ronit (eds.). Islam and Tibet: Interactions Along the Musk Routes. Farnham, Surrey: Ashgate Publishing. pp. 117–144. ISBN 978-0-7546-6956-2.

Preceded by Tegin Shah	Turk Shahis; 738-745 CE	Succeeded by Bo Fuzhun
