= Sharada script =

Abugida

Sharada script Śāradā 𑆯𑆳𑆫𑆢𑆳
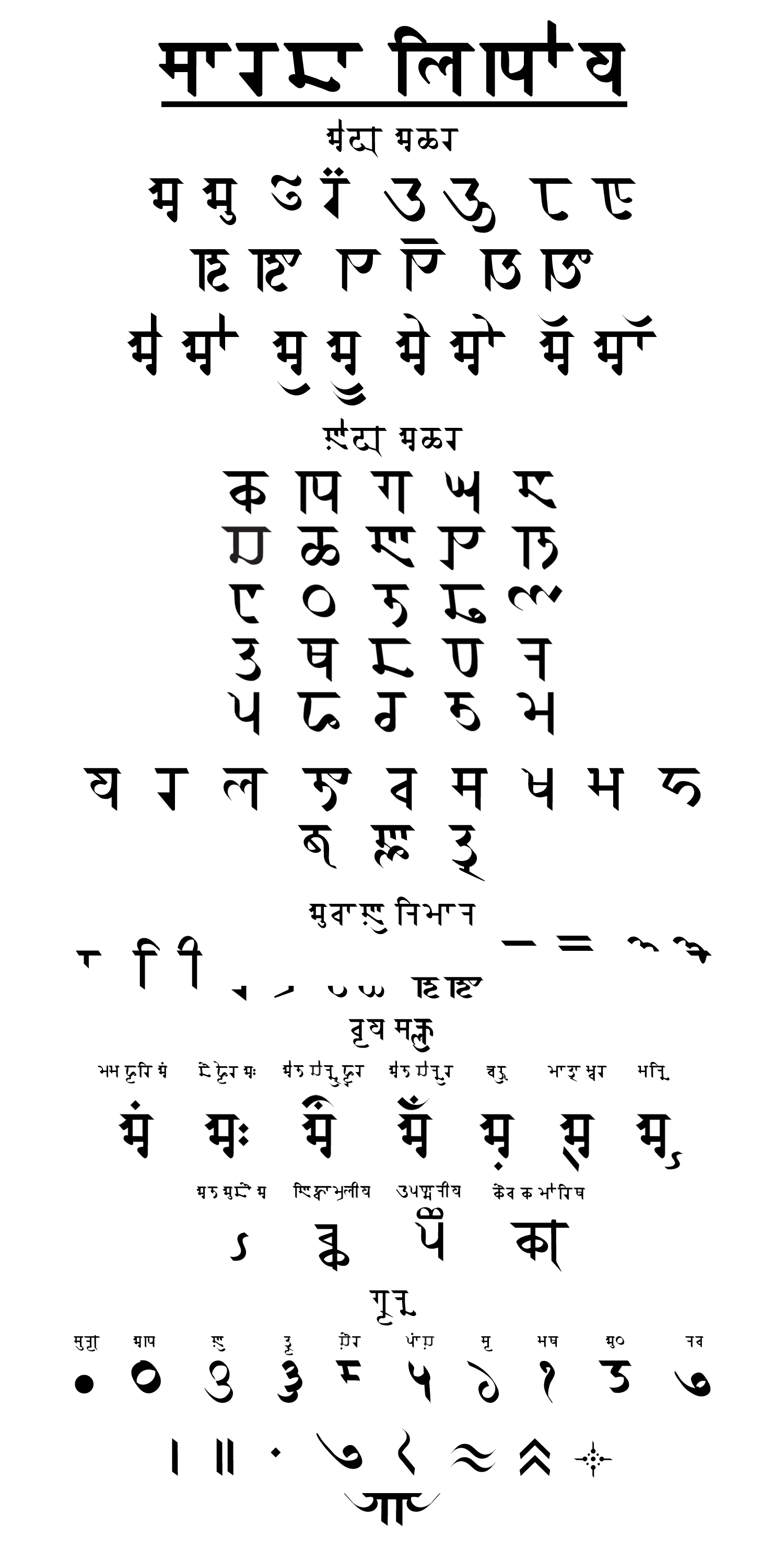
- Śāradā script chart divided into 14 Sanskrit origin vowels, 8 new vowel diacritics for modern Kashmiri, 37 consonants, 14 vowel diacritics, 11 special diacritic marks (Note: mostly used in historical Sanskrit texts),10 numerical digits and 8 punctuation marks with the invocation sign Oksangor (𑇚) at the very top.
- Script type: Abugida
- Period: 700 CE –present (almost extinct)
- Direction: Left-to-right
- Region: India, Pakistan, Central Asia
- Languages: Sanskrit, Kashmiri

Related scripts
- Parent systems: Egyptian: Proto-Sinaitic; Phoenician; Aramaic (debated); Brahmi; Gupta; Sharada script
- Child systems: Takri; Landa
- Sister systems: Siddham, Tibetan, Kalinga, Bhaiksuki

ISO 15924
- ISO 15924: Shrd (319), Sharada, Śāradā

Unicode
- Unicode alias: Sharada
- Unicode range: U+11180–U+111DF Sharada, U+11B60–U+11B7F Sharada Supplement

The Śāradā (also spelled Sarada or Sharada) script is an abugida writing system of the Brahmic family of scripts. The script was widespread between the 8th and 12th centuries in the northwestern parts of Indian Subcontinent (in Kashmir and neighbouring areas), for writing Sanskrit and Kashmiri. Although originally a signature Brahminical script created in the valley, it was more widespread throughout northwestern Indian subcontinent, and later became restricted to Kashmir, and is now rarely used, except by the Kashmiri Pandit community for religious purposes.

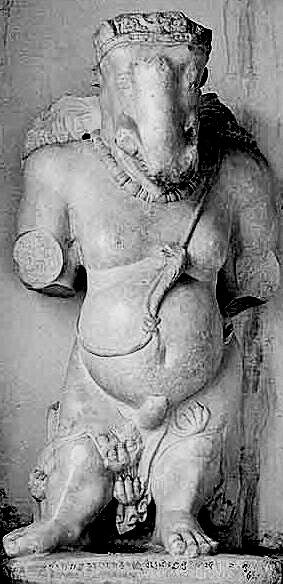
The Gardez Ganesha, a 6th-century marble Ganesha found in Gardez, Afghanistan, now at Dargah Pir Rattan Nath, Kabul. The Sharada inscription says that this "great and beautiful image of Mahāvināyaka" was consecrated by the Turk Shahi king Khingala.

== Name ==
Sharda script is named after the Hindu goddess Śāradā, also known as Saraswati, the goddess of learning and the main Hindu deity of the Sharada Peeth temple.

== History ==
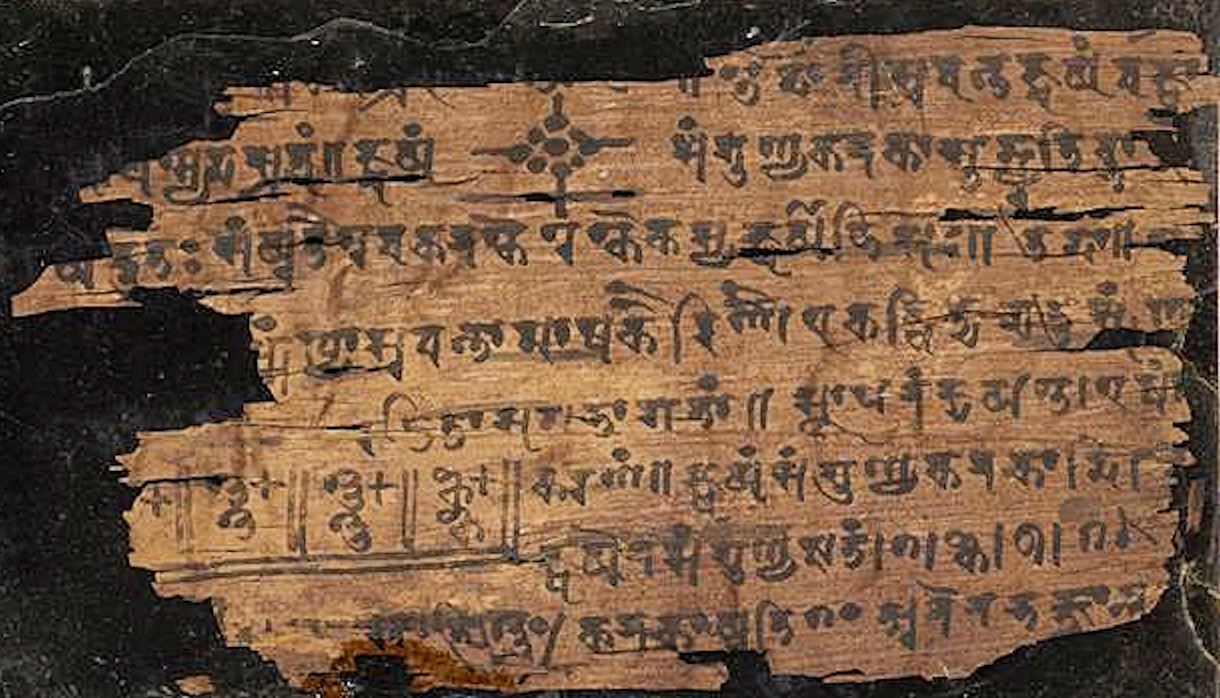
Bakhshali manuscript

Om in Sharada script

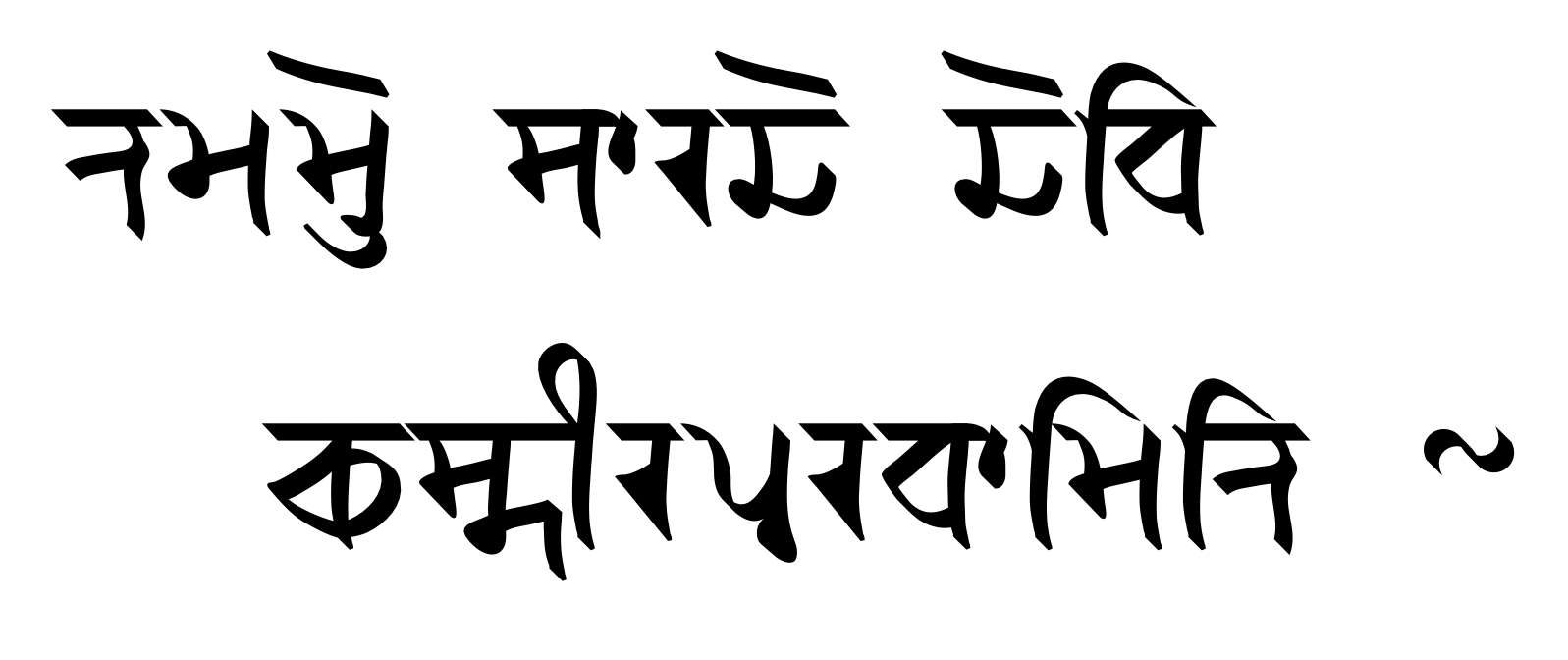
The first half stanza of the Śāradāstotra rendered in Śāradā script.

The Bakhshali manuscript uses an early stage of the Sharada script. The Sharada script was used in Afghanistan as well as in the Himachal region in India. In Afghanistan, the Kabul Ganesh has a 6th to 8th century Proto-Sharada inscription mentioning the, Turk Shahis, king Khingala of Oddiyana.

From the 10th century onwards, regional differences started to appear between the Sharada script used in Punjab, the Hill States (partly Himachal Pradesh) and Kashmir. Sharada proper was eventually restricted to very limited ceremonial use in Kashmir, as it grew increasingly unsuitable for writing the Kashmiri language. With the last known inscription dating to 1204 C.E., the early 13th century marks a milestone in the development of Sharada. The regional variety in Punjab continued to evolve from this stage through the 14th century; during this period it starts to appear in forms closely resembling Gurmukhī and other Landa scripts. By the 15th century, Sharada had evolved so considerably that epigraphists denote the script at this point by a special name, Devāśeṣa. At the historic temple of Mirkula Devi (also Mrikula Devi) in Lahaul, [Himachal Pradesh], the goddess Mahishamardini has a Sharada inscription of 1569 CE.

Although originally a script restricted to only Brahmins, Sharda was later spread throughout the larger Hindu population in Northwestern Indian subcontinent, as Hinduism became the dominant religion in the region again.

== Letters ==
The word śāradā in Sharada script

=== Vowels ===
Letter	Diacritic on ⟨𑆥⟩	Special forms
𑆃- a IPA: [ɐ]	𑆥 pa	
𑆄𑆳 ā IPA: [aː]	𑆥𑆳 pā	𑆕 → 𑆕𑆳; 𑆘 → 𑆘𑆳; 𑆛 → 𑆛𑆳; 𑆟 → 𑆟𑆳
𑆅𑆴 i IPA: [ɪ]	𑆥𑆴 pi	
𑆆𑆵 ī IPA: [iː]	𑆥𑆵 pī	
𑆇𑆶 u IPA: [ʊ]	𑆥𑆶 pu	𑆑 → 𑆑𑆶; 𑆓 → 𑆓𑆶; 𑆙 → 𑆙𑆶; 𑆚 → 𑆚𑆶; 𑆝 → 𑆝𑆶; 𑆠 → 𑆠𑆶; 𑆨 → 𑆨𑆶; 𑆫 → 𑆫𑆶; 𑆯 → 𑆯𑆶
𑆈𑆷 ū IPA: [uː]	𑆥𑆷 pū	𑆑 → 𑆑𑆷; 𑆓 → 𑆓𑆷; 𑆙 → 𑆙𑆷; 𑆚 → 𑆚𑆷; 𑆝 → 𑆝𑆷; 𑆠 → 𑆠𑆷; 𑆨 → 𑆨𑆷; 𑆫 → 𑆫𑆷; 𑆯 → 𑆯𑆷
𑆉𑆸 r̥ IPA: [r̩]	𑆥𑆸 pr̥	𑆑 → 𑆑𑆸
𑆊𑆹 r̥̄ IPA: [r̩ː]	𑆥𑆹 pr̥̄	𑆑 → 𑆑𑆹
𑆋𑆺 l̥ IPA: [l̩]	𑆥𑆺 pl̥	
𑆌𑆻 l̥̄ IPA: [l̩ː]	𑆥𑆻 pl̥̄	
𑆍𑆼 ē IPA: [eː]	𑆥𑆼 pē	
𑆎𑆽 ai IPA: [aːi̯], [ai], [ɐi], [ɛi]	𑆥𑆽 pai	
𑆏𑆾 ō IPA: [oː]	𑆥𑆾 pō	
𑆐𑆿 au IPA: [aːu̯], [au], [ɐu], [ɔu]	𑆥𑆿 pau	
𑆃𑆀𑆀 am̐ IPA: [◌̃]	𑆥𑆀 pam̐	
𑆃𑆁𑆁 aṃ IPA: [n], [m]	𑆥𑆁 paṃ	
𑆃𑆂𑆂 aḥ IPA: [h]	𑆥𑆂 paḥ	

=== Consonants ===
𑆑 ka IPA: [kɐ]	𑆒 kha IPA: [kʰɐ]	𑆓 ga IPA: [ɡɐ]	𑆔 gha IPA: [ɡʱɐ]	𑆕 ṅa IPA: [ŋɐ]
𑆖 ca IPA: [tɕɐ]	𑆗 cha IPA: [tɕʰɐ]	𑆘 ja IPA: [dʑɐ]	𑆙 jha IPA: [dʑʱɐ]	𑆚 ña IPA: [ɲɐ]
𑆛 ṭa IPA: [ʈɐ]	𑆜 ṭha IPA: [ʈʰɐ]	𑆝 ḍa IPA: [ɖɐ]	𑆞 ḍha IPA: [ɖʱɐ]	𑆟 ṇa IPA: [ɳɐ]
𑆠 ta IPA: [tɐ]	𑆡 tha IPA: [tʰɐ]	𑆢 da IPA: [dɐ]	𑆣 dha IPA: [dʱɐ]	𑆤 na IPA: [nɐ]
𑆥 pa IPA: [pɐ]	𑆦 pha IPA: [pʰɐ]	𑆧 ba IPA: [bɐ]	𑆨 bha IPA: [bʱɐ]	𑆩 ma IPA: [mɐ]
𑆪 ya IPA: [jɐ]	𑆫 ra IPA: [rɐ], [ɾɐ], [ɽɐ], [ɾ̪ɐ]	𑆬 la IPA: [lɐ]	𑆭 ḷa IPA: [ɭɐ]	𑆮 va IPA: [ʋɐ]
𑆯 śa IPA: [ɕɐ]	𑆰 ṣa IPA: [ʂɐ]	𑆱 sa IPA: [sɐ]	𑆲 ha IPA: [ɦɐ]	

== Numerals ==
0 𑇐	1 𑇑	2 𑇒	3 𑇓	4 𑇔	5 𑇕	6 𑇖	7 𑇗	8 𑇘	9 𑇙

Sharada script uses its own signs for the positional decimal numeral system.

== Image gallery ==
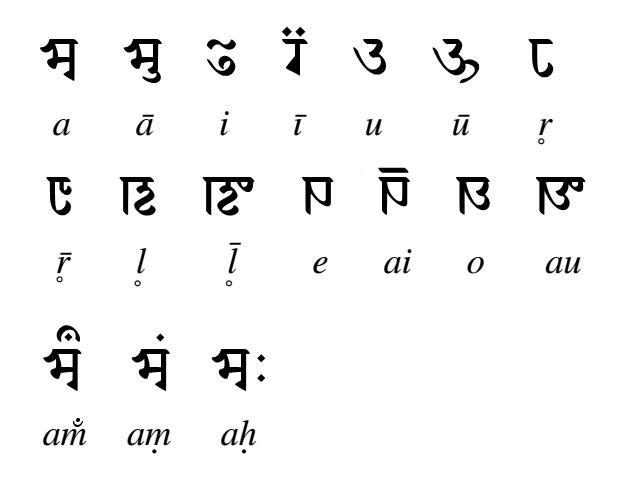
Sharada vowels

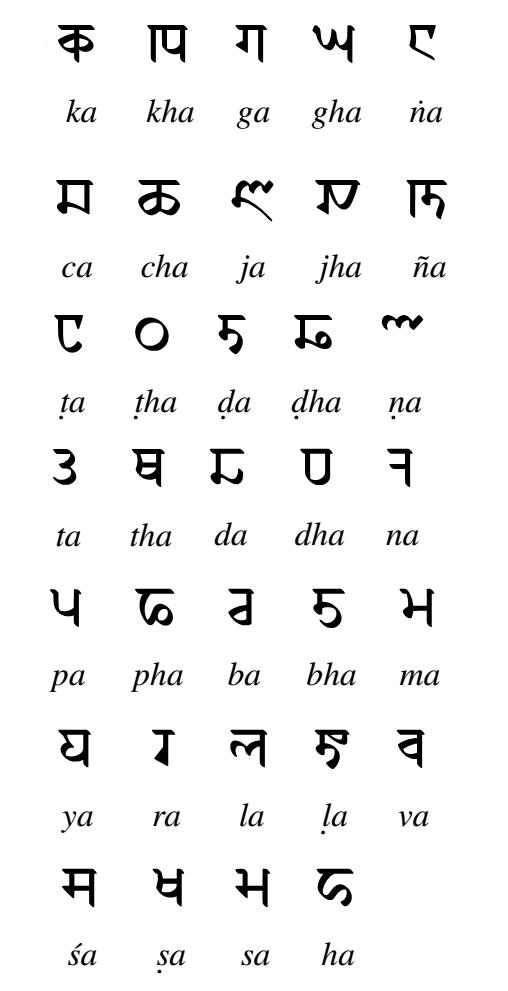
Sharada consonant signs

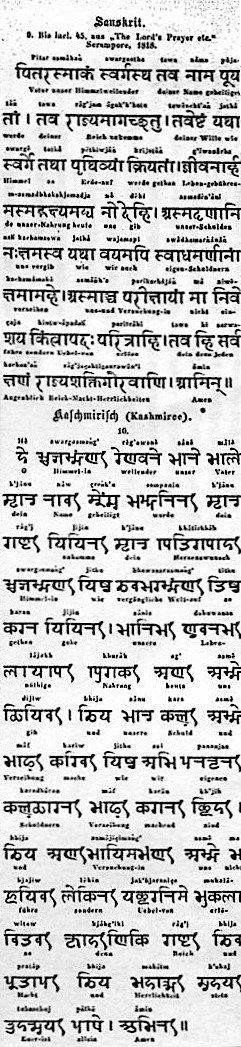
Sanskrit (above; devanagari script) and Kashmiri language (below; sharada script)

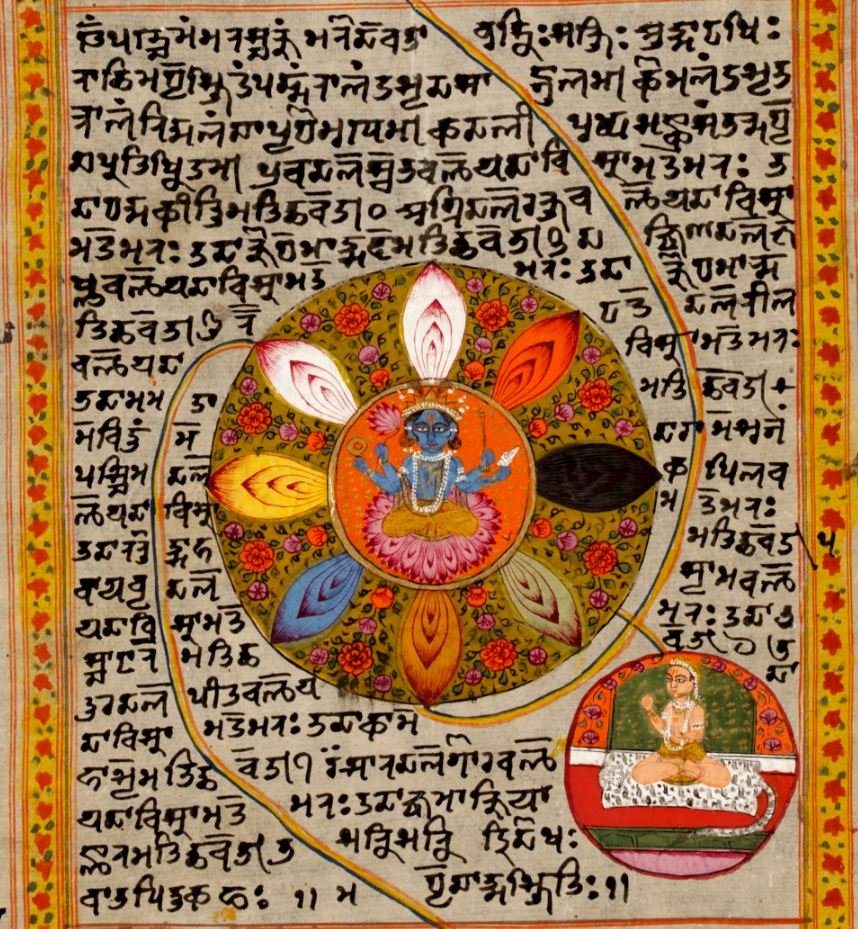
Old manuscript using Sharada script

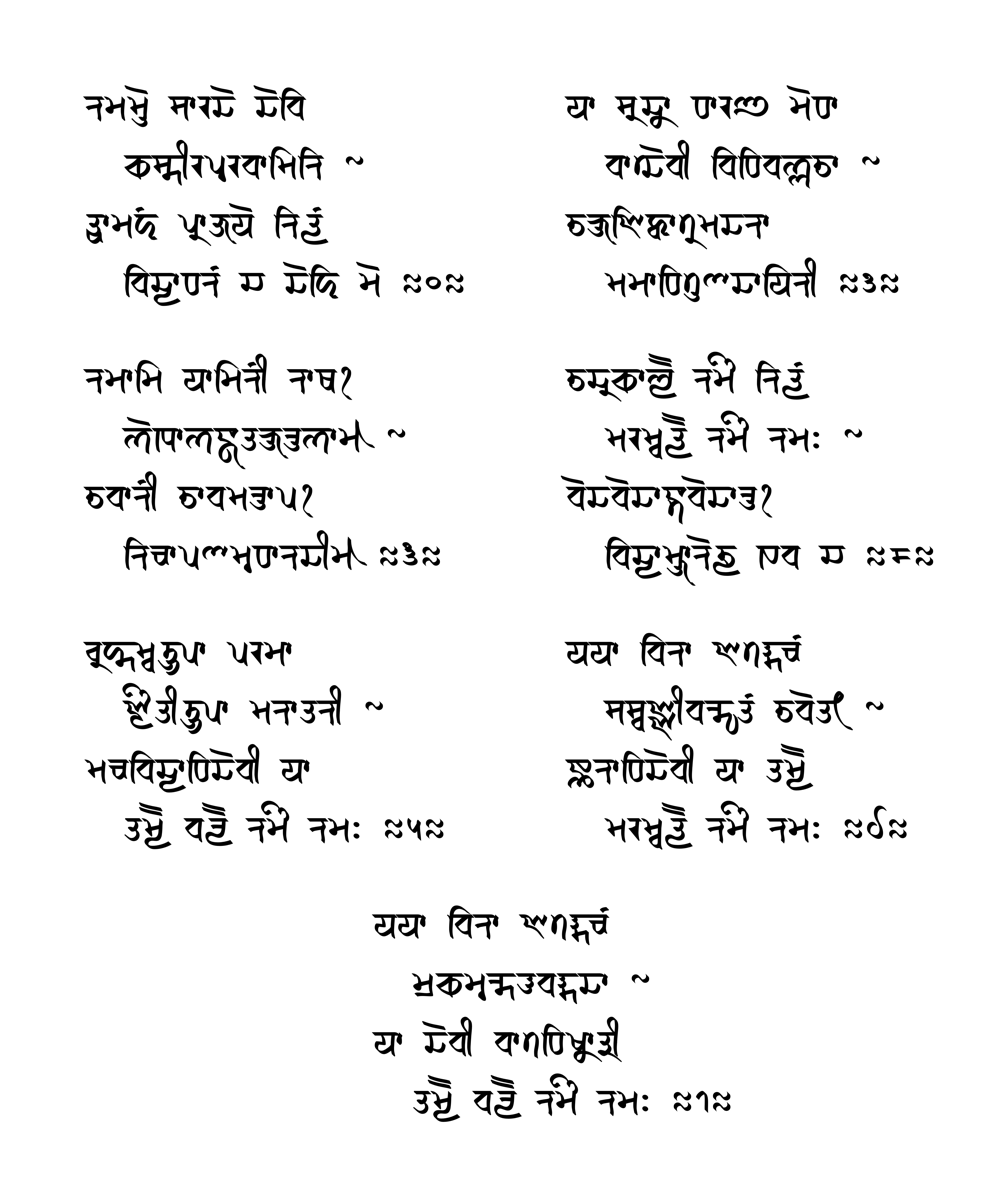
The Sharadastotra rendered in the style of handwritten manuscripts from the 17th to 19th century

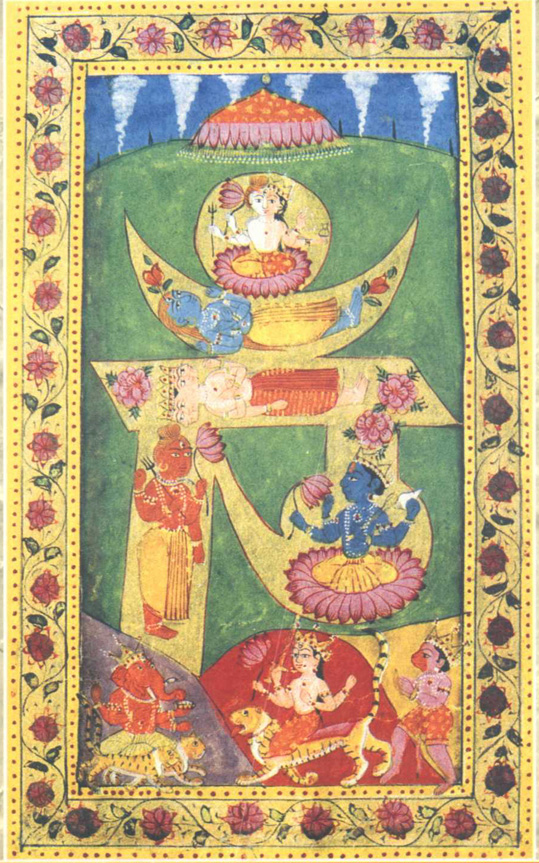
Kashmiri miniature painting of Brahma, Vishnu, Mahesh, and other Indic deities figuratively within the Sharada script Omkar glyph

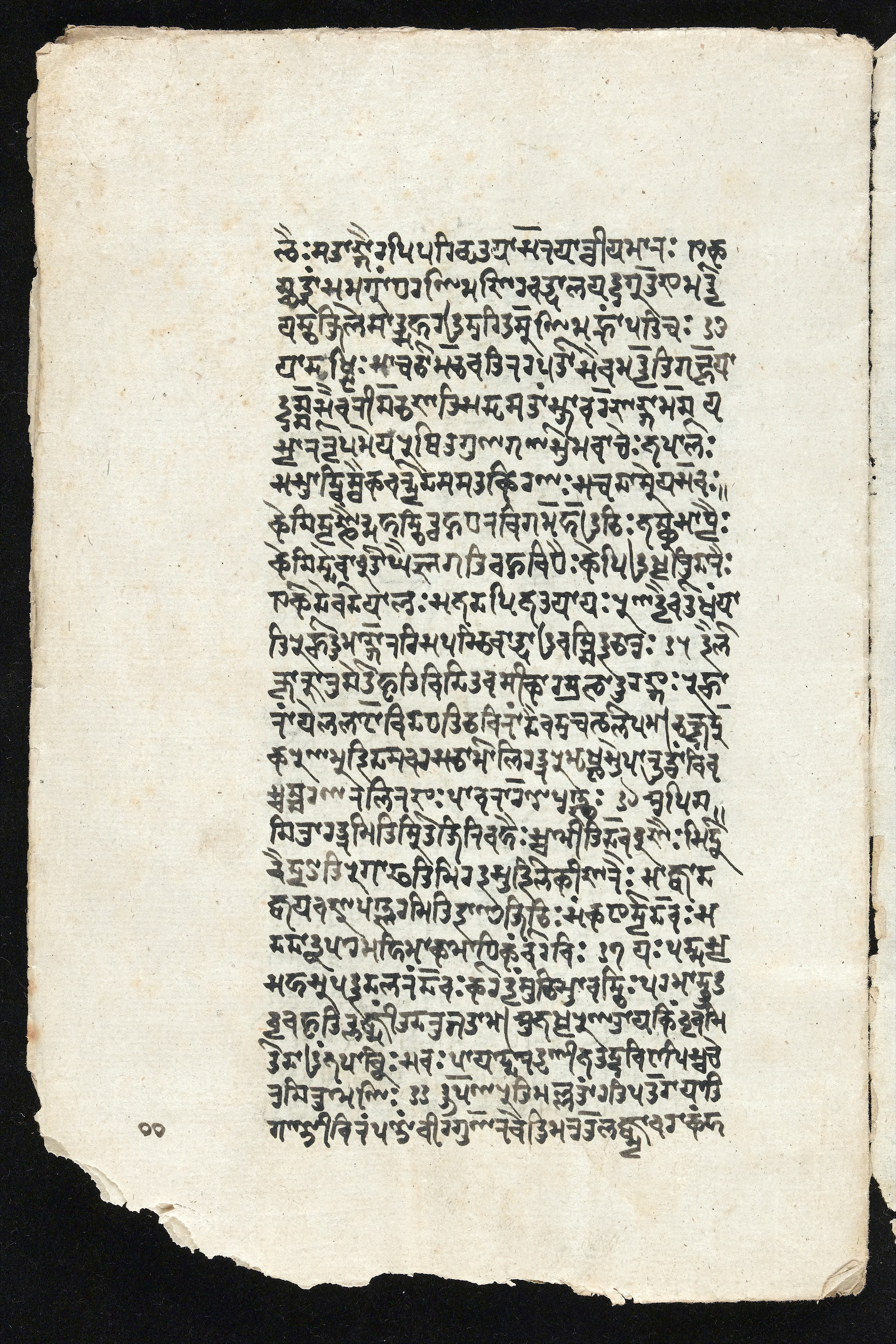
Folio of the Citrabhânuçataka by Ratnakantha Rajanaka written in Sharada script, circa 17th century

== Unicode ==
Śāradā script was added to the Unicode Standard in January, 2012 with the release of version 6.1.

The Unicode block for Śāradā script, called Sharada, is U+11180–U+111DF:

Sharada^{[1]} Official Unicode Consortium code chart (PDF)
	0	1	2	3	4	5	6	7	8	9	A	B	C	D	E	F
U+1118x	𑆀	𑆁	𑆂	𑆃	𑆄	𑆅	𑆆	𑆇	𑆈	𑆉	𑆊	𑆋	𑆌	𑆍	𑆎	𑆏
U+1119x	𑆐	𑆑	𑆒	𑆓	𑆔	𑆕	𑆖	𑆗	𑆘	𑆙	𑆚	𑆛	𑆜	𑆝	𑆞	𑆟
U+111Ax	𑆠	𑆡	𑆢	𑆣	𑆤	𑆥	𑆦	𑆧	𑆨	𑆩	𑆪	𑆫	𑆬	𑆭	𑆮	𑆯
U+111Bx	𑆰	𑆱	𑆲	𑆳	𑆴	𑆵	𑆶	𑆷	𑆸	𑆹	𑆺	𑆻	𑆼	𑆽	𑆾	𑆿
U+111Cx	𑇀	𑇁	𑇂	𑇃	𑇄	𑇅	𑇆	𑇇	𑇈	𑇉	𑇊	𑇋	𑇌	𑇍	𑇎	𑇏
U+111Dx	𑇐	𑇑	𑇒	𑇓	𑇔	𑇕	𑇖	𑇗	𑇘	𑇙	𑇚	𑇛	𑇜	𑇝	𑇞	𑇟
Notes 1.As of Unicode version 18.0

Kashmiri-specific vowels for contemporary use with Śāradā script were added in September 2025 with the release of version 17.0.

They are in the Sharada Supplement block, which is U+11B60–U+11B7F:

Sharada Supplement^{[1]}^{[2]} Official Unicode Consortium code chart (PDF)
	0	1	2	3	4	5	6	7	8	9	A	B	C	D	E	F
U+11B6x	𑭠	𑭡	𑭢	𑭣	𑭤	𑭥	𑭦	𑭧								
U+11B7x																
Notes 1.As of Unicode version 18.0 2.Grey areas indicate non-assigned code points

== See also ==
- Lipi – writing scripts in Buddhist, Hindu and Jaina texts
- Sharada Peeth in Kashmir
