= Sarat Chandra =

Sarat Chandra may refer to the following:

== People ==
- Sarat Chandra Bose (1889–1950), Indian barrister and independence activist
- Sarat Chandra Chattopadhyay (1876–1938), Indian novelist and short story writer
- Sarat Chandra Das (1849–1917), Indian scholar of Tibetan language and culture
- Sarat Chandra Pandit (1881–1968), Indian composer
- Sarat Chandra Roy (1871–1942), Indian scholar of anthropology
- Sarat Chandra Sinha (1914–2005), Indian politician
- Sarat Chandralal Fonseca (1950-present), Field Marshal of Sri Lankan army

== Places ==
- Sarat Chandra Kuthi (house of Sarat Chandra Chattopadhyay), Samta, Howrah district, West Bengal, India
- Sarat Chandra metro station, Kolkata, India; named after Sarat Chandra Chattopadhyay
