= Sharad Sagar =

Indian businessman

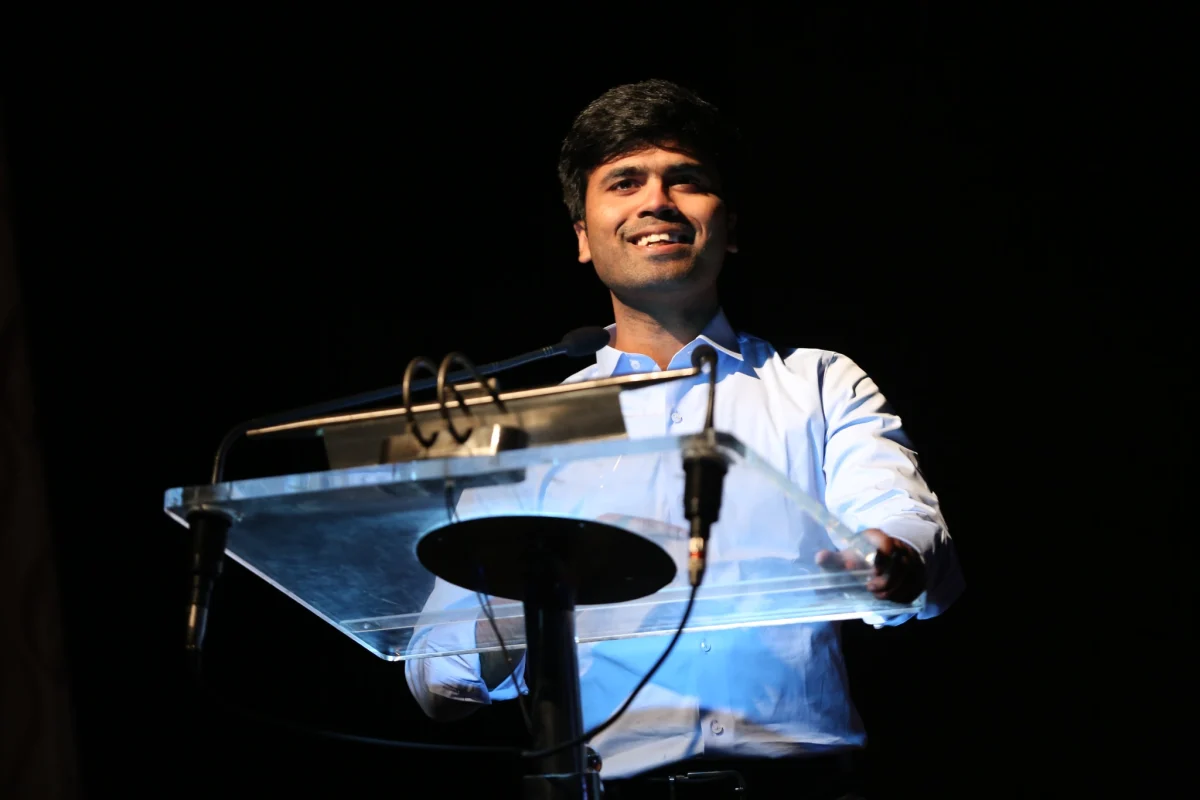
- Born: October 24, 1991 (age 34); Zeradei, Bihar, India.
- Education: Tufts University, Harvard Graduate School of Education
- Occupation: Social Entrepreneur
- Organization: The Dexterity Global Group

Sharad Sagar (born October 24, 1991) is an Indian social entrepreneur and the Founder and CEO of Dexterity Global. He is enlisted in the 2016 Forbes 30 under 30 list as a social entrepreneur. Sagar is also the expert for famous television show Kaun Banega Crorepati (KBC).

== Early life ==
Sagar was born in a small village called Ziradei in Siwan, Bihar, India.

== Education ==
Sagar graduated from Tufts University, Medford, Massachusetts with a degree in International Relations. At Tufts University, he was the first freshman to win the Tufts’ $100,000 Entrepreneurship Challenge. The following year, he was a winner of the Paul and Elizabeth Montle Prize. In May 2016, Sharad delivered the baccalaureate address at Tufts University. He was also one of the winners of the 2016 Samuel Huntington Public Service Award.

== Career ==
Sagar is working in the field of education and public service as an entrepreneur. He founded Dexterity Global in 2008 at the age of 16.

Sagar participated in Telenor Youth Forum 2016 in Oslo.

== Awards and recognition ==
He was in the runners-up position for Queen's Young Leaders Awards. awarded to 240 influential change-makers, representing 53 Commonwealth countries in 2018. He was invited by President Barack Obama to the White House.
