= Oddiyana =

Region ascribed importance in Buddhism

The region of Udiana (also: Uḍḍiyāna, Uḍḍāyāna, Udyāna or 'Oḍḍiyāna') (Note: Sanskrit: ओड्डियान, उड्डियान, उड्डायान, उद्यान, Odia: ଓଡ଼ିଆଣ, ଓଡ୍ଡିଆଣ, Tibetan: ཨུ་རྒྱན་, Wylie: u rgyan, Chinese: 烏萇; pinyin: Wūcháng, Mongolian: Үржин urjin.) is ascribed importance in the development and dissemination of Vajrayāna Buddhism. Tibetan Buddhist traditions view it as a Beyul (Tibetan: སྦས་ཡུལ, Wylie: sbas-yul), a legendary heavenly place inaccessible to ordinary mortals. Padmasambhava, the eighth-century Buddhist master who was instrumental in the introduction of Buddhism to Tibet, was believed to have been born in Oddiyana. The Dzogchen Siddha Garab Dorje is likewise attributed to this region.

It is ascribed importance in the development and dissemination of Vajrayāna Buddhism. The region was also an important place for the practice of Śaivite Hinduism. It is seen as the homeland of the Mahārtha (aka Krama Kalikula) lineage of Śaiva Tantra. The first Mahārtha Siddha, Jñānanetra Nātha, is said to have awakened and taught in this country. It was also called as “the paradise of the Ḍākinīs”.

== Proposed locations ==
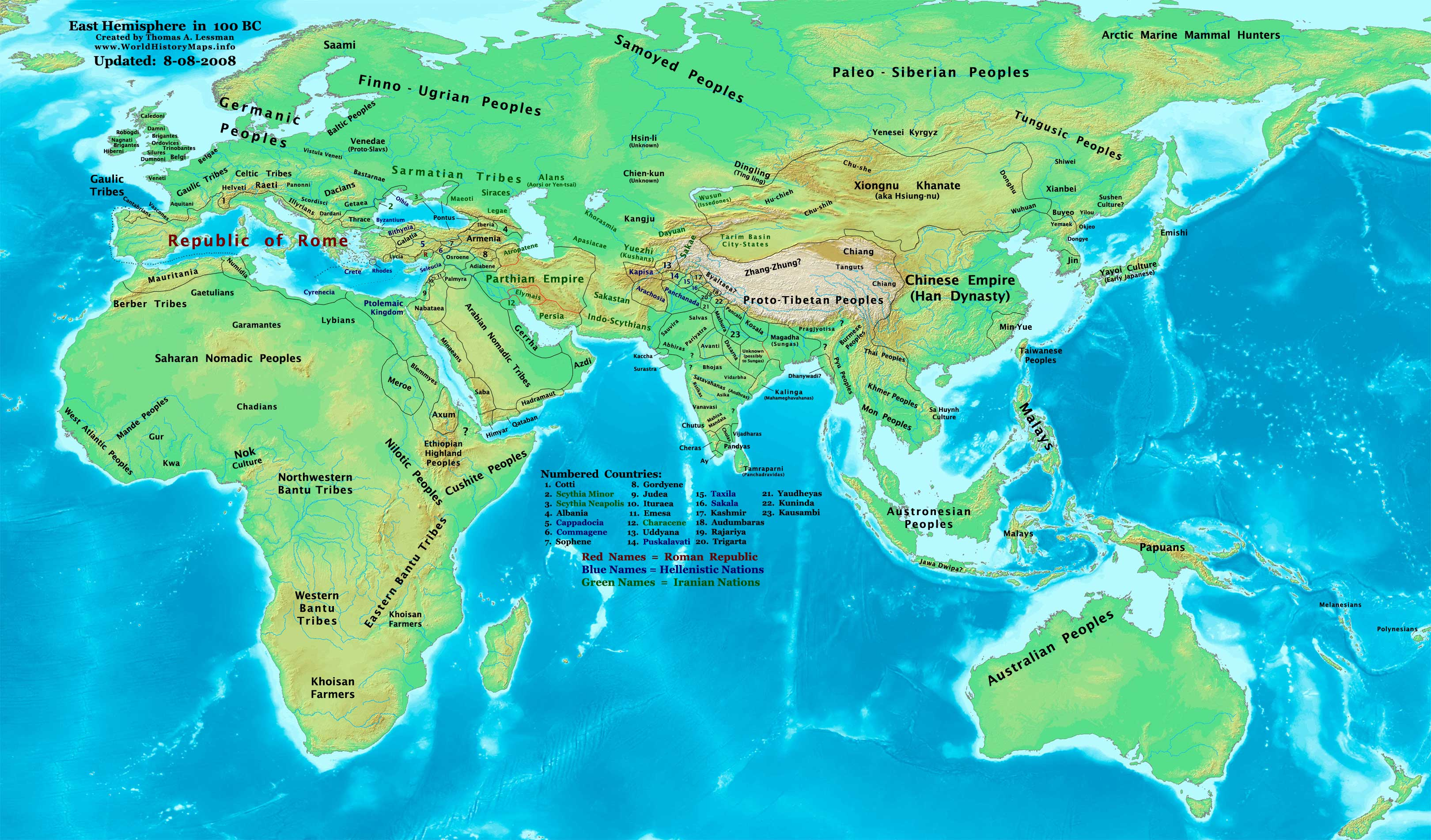
The region of Uddayana in 100 BC, shown to northwest of medieval India

=== Swat ===
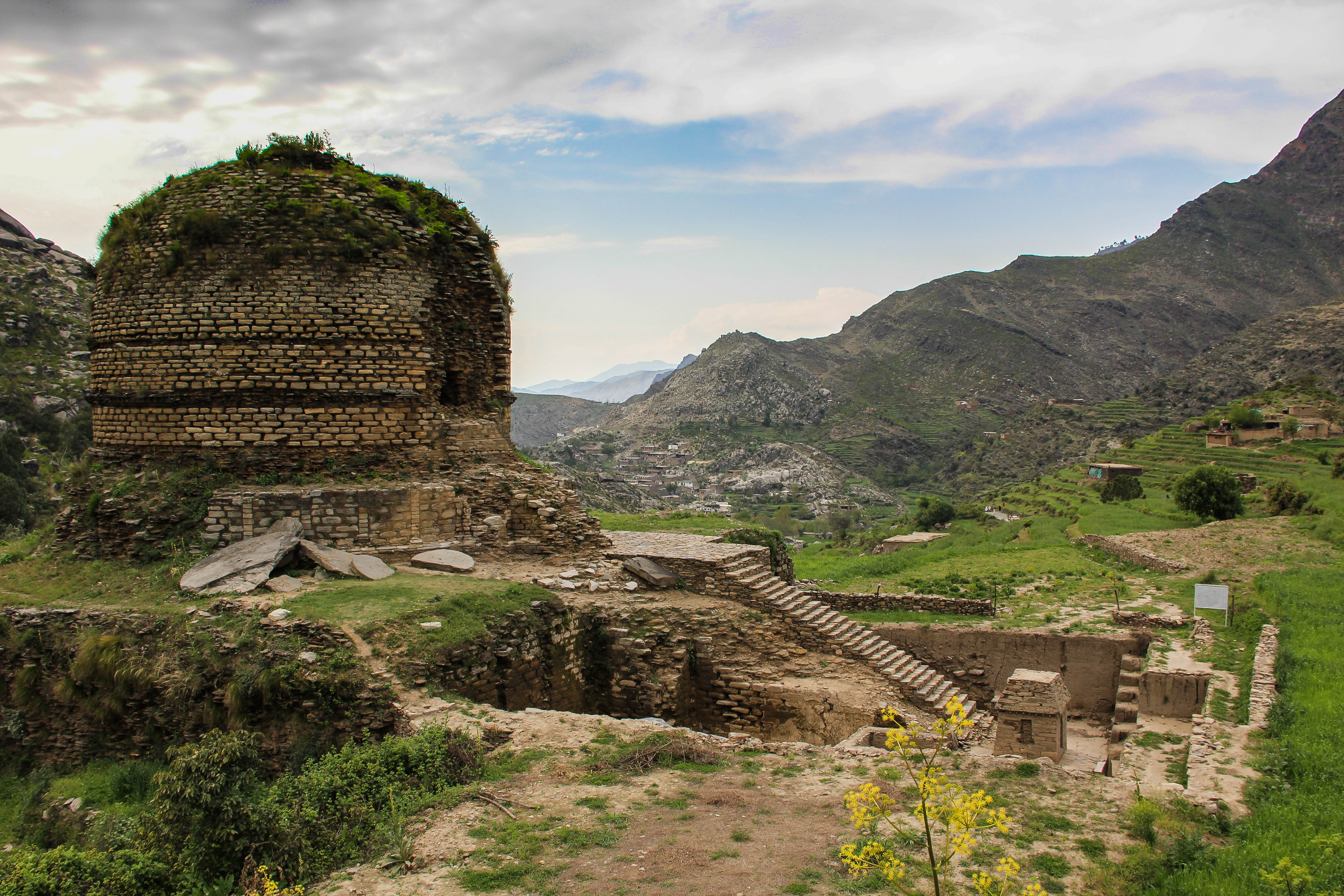
The Amluk-Dara stupa, in the Swat District of Pakistan. The main stupa with its sacred area was founded around the third century and lasted until 10th or 11th century.

Many Western scholars have identified it as the Swat Valley in what is now Khyber Pakhtunkhwa in Pakistan. Laurence Waddell, Sylvain Lévi, Giuseppe Tucci, and Prabodh Chandra Bagchi have shown that the Tibetan name Urgyan and the Chinese name Wutch'ang correspond to Uddiyana which is identical with the modern-day Swat Valley. Alexis Sanderson revisited the issue of the location, taking note of the various far-flung locations that have been identified with Oddiyana at different times and by different sources. He came to the conclusion, drawn from his careful examination of a variety of old textual citations, that it was located near Kashmir, accepting the modern-day Swat as the probable epicentre of a historical Oddiyana.

Udyāna (Sanskrit "garden, orchard") is sometimes reported as being located north of Peshawar along the Swat River; it was regarded as the furthest part of northern ancient India during the time of Faxian. The 8th century Korean monk Hye Cho wrote in his Memoir of the travel to the five Indian regions that after visiting Gandhara, he went directly north, entered the mountains and after travelling for three days, arrived in Udyana (locally called Oddiyana), a mountainous Buddhist region. From Udyana, he travelled northeast for fifteen days and reached Chitral. Faxian stated that the food and clothing worn by those in Udyana were similar to those residing in the Indo-Gangetic Plain.

The area is said to have supported some 500 viharas of the Sthavira Nikāya, at which traveling monks were provided lodgings and food for three days. It was said to contain a Buddha footprint, a rock on which he dried his clothes, and a locale where he converted a nāga. It is said that two schools derived from the Sthavira nikāya, the Dharmaguptaka and Kāśyapīya, were established in this area. Both of these schools had proto-Mahayana doctrines.

While the 6th to 8th century Gardez Ganesh offers a memorial inscription, to Turk Shahis king Khingala of Oddiyana.

The following Hindu Shahis are believed to belong to the Uḍi/Oḍi tribe, namely the people of Oddiyana whose rulers were already known at the time of the Kushan Empire (3rd century CE) and are recorded as early as the 4th century BCE.

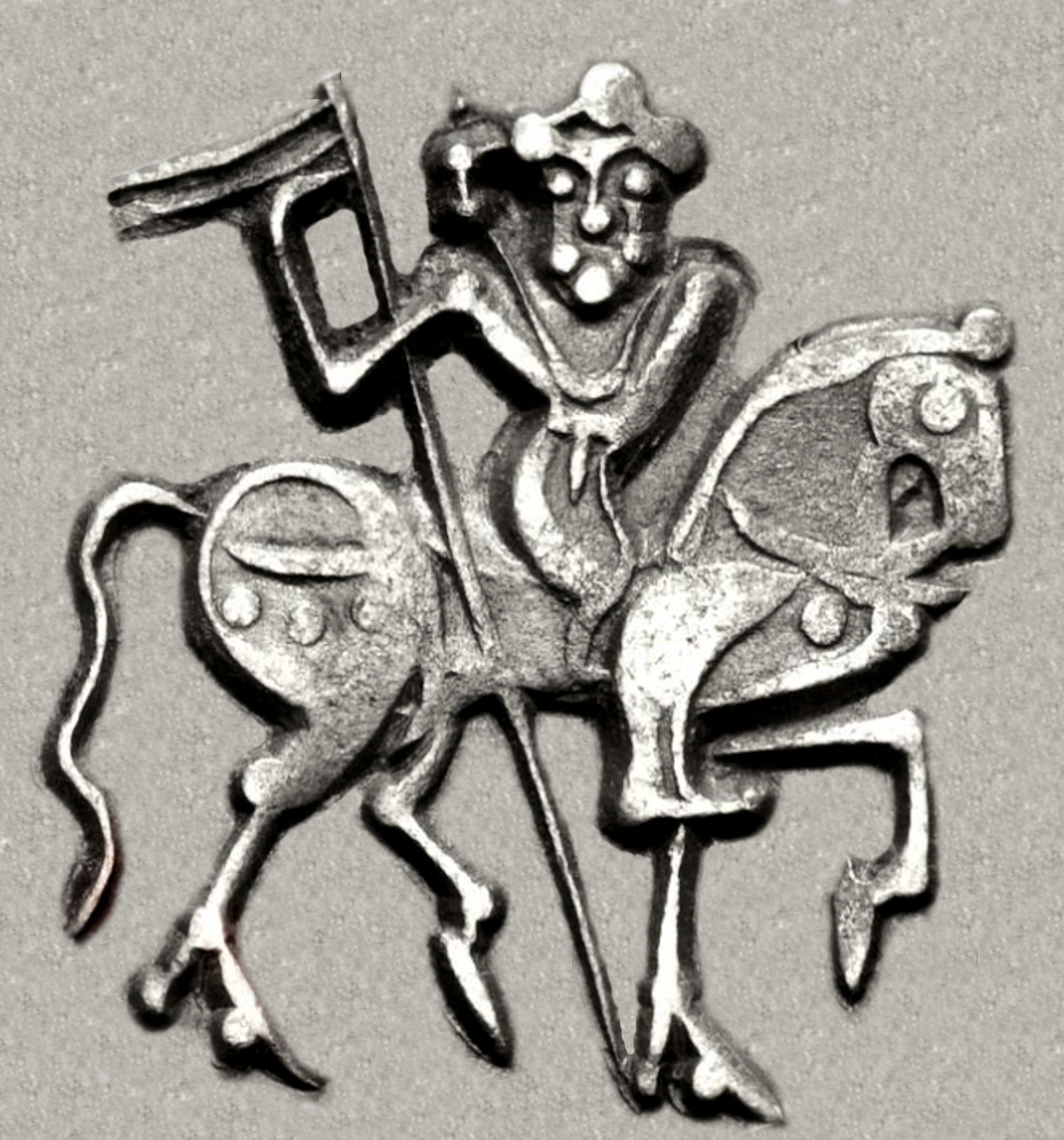
Horseman on a coin of Spalapati, i.e. the "War-lord" of the Hindu Shahis. The headgear has been interpreted as a turban.

=== Odisha ===
An alternate theory places its location in what is now the modern Indian state of Odisha, through a case founded upon "literary, archeological and iconographic evidence". Scholars championing this location contend that the name Oḍḍiyāna derives from the Dravidian Oṭṭiyan, denoting a native or indigenous person of Oḍra ("Odisha") or from Oṭṭiyam, Telugu for Oḍra. Oḍḍiyāna is also the Middle Indic form of Udyāna "garden," the name by which Xuanzang knew the region around Odisha.

Confusion about the identity of Oddiyana is conflated with confusion about the identity of Indrabhuti as Donaldson (2001: p. 11) observes:

In his argument, P. C. Bagchi states that there are two distinct series of names in Tibetan: (1) O-rgyān, U-rgyān, O-ḍi-yā-na, and (2) O-ḍi-vi-śā, with the first series connected with Indrabhūti, i.e., Oḍiyăna and Uḍḍiyāna, while the second series falls back on Oḍi and Oḍiviśa, i.e., Uḍra (Odisha) and has nothing to do with Indrabhūti. N.K. Sahu objects, however, and points out that these two sets of names are seldom distinguished in Buddhist Tantra literature, and opines that the words Oḍa, Oḍra, Uḍra, Oḍiviśa and Oḍiyāna are all used as variants of Uḍḍiyāna. In the Sādhanamālā, he further points out, Uḍḍiyāna is also spelt as Oḍrayāna while in the Kālikā Purāṇa, as indicated earlier, it is spelt either Uḍḍiyāna or Oḍra. There is also evidence, Sahu continues, that Indrabhūti is the king of Odisha rather than of the Swāt valley. The Caturāsiti-siddha-Pravṛtti, for example, mentions him as the king of Oḍiviśa while Cordier, in his Bṣtān-ḥgyur catalogue, gives sufficient indications of his being the king of Orissa. Also, in his famous work Jñānasiddhi, king Indrabhūti opens it with an invocation to Lord Jagannātha, a deity intimately associated with Odisha and with no other area of India.

Arguments contending this stand have also been put forward. But this is improbable; the Chinese sources refer to Odisha as Wu-T'u or Ota or Wu-cha, while the Tibetans refer to Orissa as Odivisa which must be different from Urgyan or Wu-chang. Moreover, Odisha became a centre of Täntrika Buddhism after the 7th century A.D., while the Swat Valley was a centre of Tantric Buddhism long before 700 A.D.

In ancient Indian literature the extreme north-western region of the country, especially Uddiyana, Gandhara, Kapisa and Tushara, find frequent mention. A Kushan inscription mentions a monk Jivaka Odiyanaka, being the earliest epigraphic reference to Uddiyana. It is certainly not in Odisha or Odivisa. The Vihära of Huviska to which Jivaka Odiyanaka made gift of a pillar was in the north-west. Xuanzang entered India from the north-west route and his biographer clearly locates Udyana's capital in North-West. Faxian, who also came from that pass clearly says that Udyana lay in the north on the Swat River.

=== Bactria ===
Some scholars have identified Oddiyana with the region around Iran or the "Near Middle East". This is based mainly on the travelogue of the 16th-century Indian Buddhist monk, Buddhaguptanātha, who identified Oddiyana with the city of Ghazni during his travels in the region in the 1530s. This identification was repeated by Herbert V. Günther who identifies Oddiyana with Bactria and the surrounding region. Gunther states Oddiyana to be the Sanskritised spelling of Urgyan and that the scholars of this region would have been exposed to ideas from other belief systems, including Gnosticism and Manichaeism. Aspects of Garab Dorje's biography (a native of Urgyan) mirror parts of the legend of Moses and Jesus. This region would have been inhabited by groups including the Tocharians and the Sogdians.

=== Others ===
John Reynolds suggests that "perhaps Uddiyana is actually a name of a much wider geographical area than the Swat Valley alone, one embracing parts of Pakistan, Afghanistan, and even Western Tibet (Zhang Zhung)." While professor Lokesh Chandra has argued that Oddiyana was located further in South India.

== In Tibetan Buddhism ==
Tibetan Buddhist traditions see Oḍḍiyāna as a source of many of their tantric teachings. It is seen as having been a land where Buddhist tantra flourished. Many lineages of Tibetan Buddhism are traced to this region, including Dzogchen (which began with the great siddha Garab Dorje). A number of Vajrayana and tantric practitioners are said to have stayed and practiced there. The first Vajrayana teachings were supposedly given there by Gautama Buddha at the request of the king. According to Dudjom Rinpoche, the Mahayoga and Anuyoga tantras were first revealed in Oḍḍiyāna.

In Tibetan Buddhist literature, Oḍḍiyāna is described as being ruled by several kings each of whom were named Indrabhūti.

Oḍḍiyāna is also often conflated or identified with Shambhala, a magical hidden land (beyul) land inhabited by ḍākinīs and inaccessible to or by ordinary mortals.

In the 'Seven Line Prayer' (of Padmasambhava) revealed in Jigme Lingpa's terma of the Ngöndro of the Longchen Nyingthig and throughout the Longchen Nyingtig Ngondro, Oddiyana is rendered in the form Tibetan: ཨོ་རྒྱན, Wylie: o rgyan.

== In Hinduism ==
In Tantric literature, Oddiyana is identified as a Shakta pitha, alongside Purnagiri, Kamarupa & Jalandhar, with Kubjika being its main goddess.
