= Sharad Haksar =

Indian photographer

Sharad Haksar is an advertising photographer from India.

== Biography ==
Born in Chennai, India, Sharad was originally drawn to architecture as a career. While applying to colleges, he shared his work with Iqbal Mohamed, who asked him to give up his plans for college and work with him. He then branched out on his own with Eye-Light Pictures. In 2002, he founded 1pointsize, a creative hotshop that caters to the multiple needs of companies looking to advertise. The strengths of 1pointsize include photography, styling, graphic design, art direction, copywriting, screenwriting, cinematography and web designing. Sharad later went on to float One Eyeland, a virtual island for creative photographers. He launched the One Eyeland Book Vol:1 in 2011, which is a compilation of the best images from creative photographers around the globe.

== Invention ==
In 2009, Sharad invented a camera lens where you can view the calendar on a screen, and change it using the external adjustment controls located on the lens. It is the first invention of its kind and is available online.

== Sources ==
The Hindu on Sharad Haksar's One Eyeland Book (Vol. 1)

- BBC on Sharad's Brand Irony controversy
- The Hindu on Sharad Haksar
