= Sharad Kumar Dixit =

Indian born American plastic surgeon

- Born: 13 December 1930; Pandharpur, Maharashtra, India
- Died: 14 November 2011 (aged 80); Brooklyn
- Occupation: Plastic surgeon
- Known for: Social service
- Spouse: divorced
- Children: 3 children
- Awards: Padma Shri; ASAPS Humanitarian Award; Vanguard Award; The Week Man of the Year; Indian Merchants' Chamber Award; IMIC CHEMTECH Lifetime Achievement Award; Nathan Davis International Award; UNESCO-Hamdan Award; Raul Wallenberg Prize; Conrad Hilton Foundation Award; Kellogg’s Hamnah World of Children Award; Bhagini Sanskar Parishad Award; NRI World-Merrill Lynch NRI of the Year Award; Diwaliben Mehta Award; World Congress of Cosmetic Surgery Lifetime Achievement Award

Sharad Kumar Dixit was an Indian born American plastic surgeon and the founder of The India Project, a social initiative for free treatment of plastic surgery for the financially compromised people. A multiple nominee for Nobel Peace Prize, he was honored by the Government of India, in 2001, with the fourth highest Indian civilian award of Padma Shri.

== Biography ==
Sharad Kumar Dixit was born in Pandharpur, Solapur district, in the Western Indian state of Maharashtra on 13 December 1930, as one among the six children of a post master. His initial choice was to study science for which he enrolled at Nizam College, Hyderabad, but discontinued the course to pursue studies in medicine at Nagpur after which he served in Indian Army for a short while. In 1959, Dixit moved to US and had higher training in Ophthalmology. However, a further change of mind saw him studying plastic surgery to secure a master's degree (MD) and worked at Fairbanks Hospital, Alaska, Mount Sinai Hospital and the New York Methodist Hospital.

Dixit, whom Lester Silver, the plastic surgeon at the Mount Sinai Medical Center termed as an ethical and moral giant, founded The India Project in 1968 for providing plastic surgery treatment for the poor sections of the Indian society. Working half the year in the US and spending the rest of the year in India conducting free medical camps where he performed thousands of cosmetic corrective surgeries for cleft lip, ptosis and squint. Later, he formed a trust and arranged for the continuity of his programs by bequeathing his assets to the Plastic Surgery Educational Foundation of the American Society of Plastic Surgeons.

While his tenure at the Fairbanks Hospital, Dixit met with a car accident in 1978 which rendered him paralysed and confined to a wheel chair. He also contracted cancer of the larynx which forced him to use a voice box, and also suffered two heart attacks. However, despite the disabilities, he did not stop his social service which he continued till his death. Dixit, under the project banner, carried on his free medical service for 42 years since 1968 collaborating with Bharatiya Jain Sangathan and is credited with over 65,000 surgeries personally performed, with a total of 266,000 surgeries under the project. He was also known to be quick in his surgeries, with reports crediting him with less than 30 minutes for a cleft lip surgery and lesser for squint, ptosis and dab surgeries. It is reported that he performed 100 to 150 surgeries in a day and the project, in 2003-04, is reported to have carried out 18,155 surgeries.

Since I am treated as entirely disabled in the United States, this is my way of coming back to my country and contributing to life around me. I do cosmetic surgery, plastic surgery, correctional surgery that helps the poor, who would not be able to otherwise afford it. I see this as my job. This is all…, said Sharadkumar Dicksheet.

Sharad Kumar Dixit married twice but divorced and had two daughters and a son. He died on 14 November 2011 at Brooklyn, USA. His life and times have been captured in a documentary film, Flying on One Engine, a 55 minute biopic directed by Joshua Z Weinstein, which narrates Dixit's life in a dilapidated Ocean Parkway apartment in Brooklyn and outside of it.

== Awards and recognitions ==
Sharad Kumar Dixit, a Maliniac Fellow of the Plastic Surgery Foundation, was nominated for the Nobel Peace Prize eight times, of which five nominations came in successive years. He received the Humanitariaon Award of the American Society of Aesthetical Surgery in 1997 and the Vanguard Award in 1998. The next year, he was selected as the Man of the Year by The Week. The year 2000 saw him receiving the Indian Merchants' Chamber Award and a year later, he received the Chemtech Lifetime Achievement Award from the International Medical Integration Council. The same year, the Government of India honoured him with the civilian award of Padma Shri. He was awarded Hamdan Award for Volunteers in Humanitarian Medical Services in 2002 by Hamdan Medical Award. The American Medical Association conferred on him the Nathan Davis International Award in 2008.

A Nominee for the 2001 Gandhi Peace Prize, he is also a recipient of UNESCO Hamdan bin Rashid Al Maktoum Award, and a nominee for the Conrad Hilton Humanitarian Award. He received US$ 100,000 as cash for the 2001 Kellogg’s Hannah Neil World of Children Award which was reportedly utilized for his humanitarian efforts in India. He also received Bhagini Sanskar Parishad Award, 2001 NRI World-Merrill Lynch NRI of the Year Award, Diwaliben Mehta Award, and the Lifetime Achievement Award of the World Congress of Cosmetic Surgery. He received the 10th Mahaveer Award by Bhagwan Mahaveer Foundation.

== See also ==
- Nobel Prize
