= James Steen (planter) =

American plantation owner (1734–1780)

- Born: 1734; The Vow, County Antrim, Ireland
- Died: 1780 (disputed); Rowan County, North Carolina
- Cause of death: Stabbing
- Spouse: Eleanor Bogan
- Military career
- Allegiance: United States
- Branch: Continental Army
- Service years: 1775–1780
- Rank: Lieutenant Colonel
- Unit: 2nd Spartan Regiment
- Conflicts: American Revolutionary War; Snow Campaign; Battle of Stono Ferry; Battle of Rocky Mount; Battle of Hanging Rock; Battle of Musgrove Mill; Battle of King's Mountain; Battle of Cowpens (disputed)

James Francis Steen (1734 – 1780) was a plantation owner and Continental Army officer at the time of the American Revolution, and resided in the Thicketty Creek area of what was once the northern part of Union County (formed in 1785) and is now part of Cherokee County, South Carolina (formed 1897). Steen, a staunch Presbyterian, was born, according to some sources, in County Antrim, Ireland about 1734, emigrating to Pennsylvania about 1760 with his family; other sources indicate he was born in Pennsylvania. The Steen family did reside in Pennsylvania for a time prior to migrating to South Carolina in the 1760s. John and James Steen both had recorded land deeds on Thicketty Creek in 1766 and 1767.

He was married to Eleanor Bogan about 1762, probably in South Carolina.

Both John and James Steen, as well as many other local natives of Thicketty, South Carolina, were heavily involved in the American Revolution. There were families who were British loyalists, as well as families such as the Steen's who were Whigs and Colonial Militia Officers. In quite a few instances, Thicketty Creek neighbors found themselves on opposite sides and battles throughout the war, in surrounding areas.

According to Lyman Draper (1815–1891), in Kings Mountain and Its Heroes:

James Steen, also of Irish descent, was probably a native of Pennsylvania, and early settled in what is now Union County, South Carolina. In August 1775, he was fully convinced and ready to sign the Continental Association and doubtless led a company on the Snow campaign, as he did the following year against the Cherokees, and, in 1777, commanded at Prince's Fort. In 1779, he served in Georgia, then at Stono, and Savannah; and performed a tour of duty from November in that year till February 1780, near Charleston. At this period, he ranked as Lieutenant-Colonel, distinguishing himself at Rocky Mount, Hanging Rock, Musgrove's Mill, King's Mountain, and probably with his superior, Colonel (Thomas) Brandon (Fair Forest Regiment), at Cowpens. In the summer of 1781, while endeavoring to arrest a Tory, in Rowan County, North Carolina, he was stabbed by an associate, surviving only a week.

== Dispute Over Death ==
There is some dispute about his death. Some in the family have asserted that Steen died at the Battle of King's Mountain. This assertion is based on "family tradition", dating back to at least 1909, though no documentation has been offered to indicate the source of that tradition. The family, however, has been able to prevail upon the Federal Government to add his name to the memorial plaque at the Kings Mountain National Military Park. Notably, there are however several proven errors that appear on the plaque, regarding individuals who did not in fact die at King's Mountain.

The tradition conflicts with at least three other important sources. First, Lyman Draper, who, as stated above, indicates "in the summer of 1781, while endeavoring to arrest a Tory, in Rowan County, North Carolina, he was stabbed by an associate, surviving only a week."

The State of South Carolina also, in the enabling act of a bridge named in Steen's honor, gives Draper's version of his death, that he died of a stabbing in 1781.

"TO REQUEST THAT THE DEPARTMENT OF TRANSPORTATION NAME THE BRIDGE ON EL BETHEL ROAD THAT CROSSES THICKETTY CREEK IN CHEROKEE COUNTY "COLONEL JAMES STEEN MEMORIAL BRIDGE" AND ERECT APPROPRIATE MARKERS OR SIGNS AT THIS BRIDGE THAT CONTAIN THE WORDS "COLONEL JAMES STEEN MEMORIAL BRIDGE". Whereas, Colonel James Steen was a prominent militia officer in the American Revolution, serving from 1775 to 1781, in the Snow Campaign, Commanding Price's Fort, serving in Georgia, then at Stono, Savannah, Charleston, the Battle of Rocky Mount, the Battle of Hanging Rock, the Battle of Musgrove's Mill, the Battle of King's Mountain, and the Battle of Cowpens; and Whereas, in the summer of 1781, while endeavoring to arrest a Tory in Rowan County, North Carolina, he was stabbed, surviving only a week; and Whereas, Colonel James Steen and his brother John Steen held land grants along Thicketty Creek and had a family plantation and family cemetery near Thicketty Creek on El Bethel Road in Cherokee County; and Whereas, it would be appropriate to name the bridge on El Bethel Road over Thicketty Creek in his honor. Now, therefore, Be it resolved by the House of Representatives, the Senate concurring: That the members of the General Assembly request the Department of Transportation name the bridge on El Bethel Road that crosses Thicketty Creek in Cherokee County "Colonel James Steen Memorial Bridge" and erect appropriate markers or signs at this bridge that contain the words "Colonel James Steen Memorial Bridge". Be it further resolved that a copy of this resolution be forwarded to the Department of Transportation."

Lastly, the Rev. James H. Saye, born 1808 in Georgia, but who lived most of his life in South Carolina, a historian who spent much of his life interviewing survivors of the Revolution still living in South Carolina and Georgia, in his notes indicates that "Steen was killed in the summer of 1780, in Rowan Co., N. C. in an attempt to arrest some Tories." This is likely where Draper got his information, erring only in transcribing the year incorrectly. It is also most likely the correct account, as James Steen disappears from the record entirely after the summer of 1780. This would also indicate that James Steen could not have been present at the Battle of Cowpens in January 1781, having died a few months previously.
