= Ezell =

Ezell may refer to:

== People ==
=== Surname ===
- Brittney Ezell (born 1976), American basketball coach
- Edward Ezell (1939–1993), American author and professor
- Glenn Ezell (1944–2020), American baseball player, coach and front-office executive
- Mike Ezell, American politician, Congressman from Mississippi
- Shahine Ezell, American actor
- William Ezell (1892–1963), American boogie-woogie pianist

=== Given name ===
- Ezell Blair, Jr., American activist
- Ezell Brown (born 1970), American businessman
- Ezell Lee, American politician

== Other uses ==
- Ezell, South Carolina, a ghost town
- Ezell, Virginia
- Ezell Park, an urban park in Nashville, Tennessee
- Ezell's Chicken, a fast food restaurant in Seattle, Washington

== See also ==
- Ezel (disambiguation)
