= Kings Pinnacle =

Mountain in United States of America

The Pinnacle

Highest point
- Elevation: 1,705 ft (520 m)
- Coordinates: 35.207817°N 81.312626°W

Geography
- Location: Gaston County, North Carolina, U.S.
- Topo map(s): USGS Kings Mountain, NC

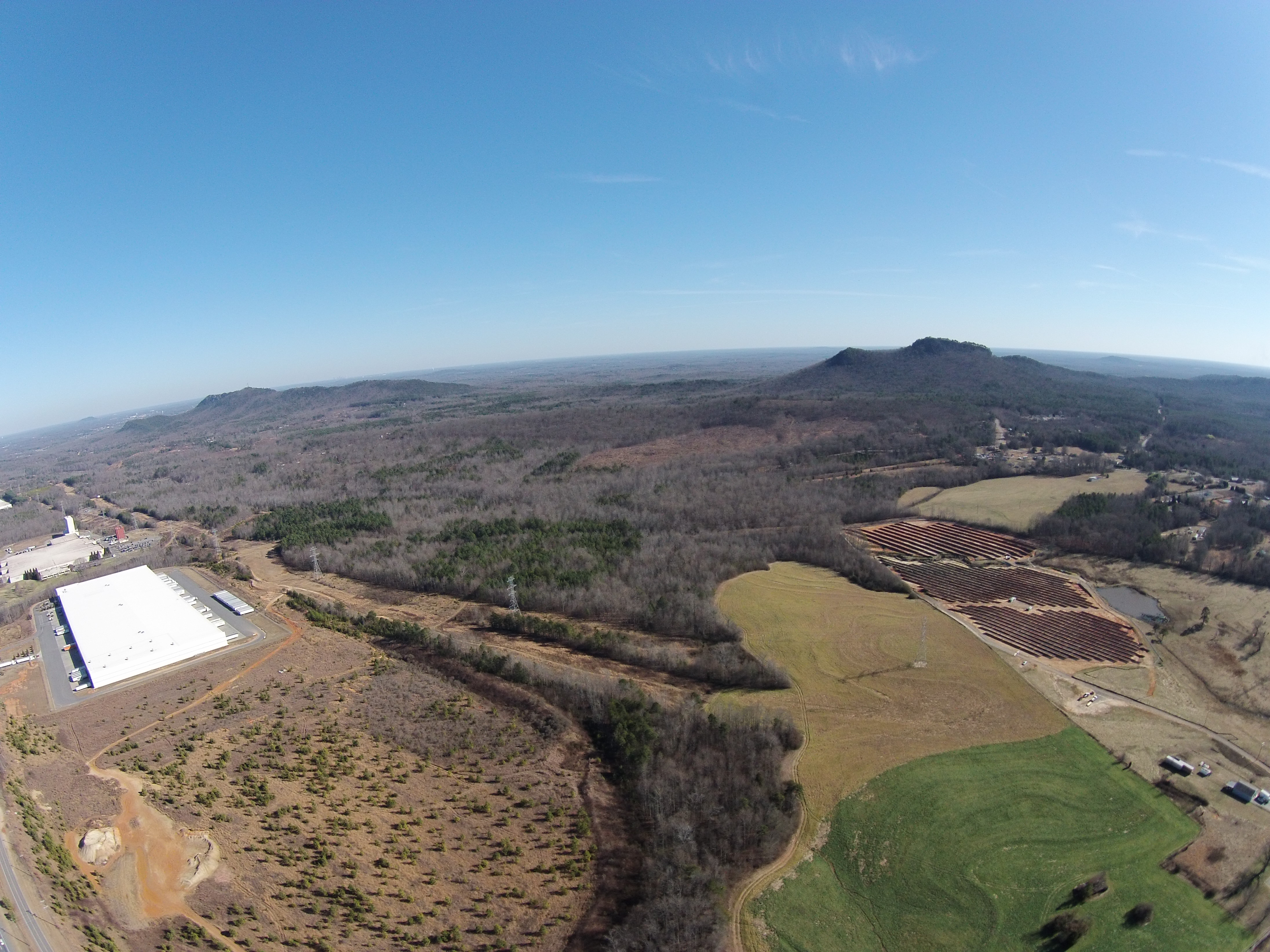
Crowders Mountain (left) and The Pinnacle (right), looking east. The skyline of Charlotte, North Carolina, is barely visible on the horizon looking over the right side of Crowders Mountain.

The Pinnacle, is one of the two main peaks located within Crowders Mountain State Park. The other peak is Crowders Mountain. The park is located in the western Piedmont of North Carolina between the cities of Kings Mountain and Gastonia.

== Geology ==
The monadnock is the remnant of a quartzite ridge which formed approximately 400–500 million years ago. The softer material that once covered and surrounded the monadnock has been gradually worn down to its present height of 1,705 feet (520 meters) above sea level. The monadnock abruptly rises some 800 feet above the surrounding countryside. The Pinnacle is part of the Kings Mountain Belt, a string of monadnocks and rock types along the piedmont in the Carolinas, many of which can be seen from the summit.

== History ==
The Pinnacle and nearby Crowders Mountain separated the historic hunting lands of the Cherokee and Catawba Indians. The Battle of Kings Mountain, an important American victory over the British Army during the American Revolution, was fought southwest of the mountain in 1780 in what is now Kings Mountain National Military Park.

== Today ==
A hiking trail leads to the summit, from which it is possible to view the much higher Blue Ridge mountains far to the west and north, and the skyscrapers of Charlotte, North Carolina some 30 miles to the east.
