= Ezel =

Ezel may refer to:

== Geography ==
- Ezel (biblical place), a rock or cairn where David hides to avoid being killed by King Saul in 1 Samuel 20:19
- Ezel, Kentucky, a town in the United States
- Ezel Island, Russian name for the Estonian island of Saaremaa

== People ==
- Ezel (given name), Turkish given name

== Arts, entertainment, and media ==
- Ezel (TV series), Turkish crime drama

== See also ==
- Ezell (disambiguation)
