= James Steen =

James Steen may refer to:

- Jim Steen (American football) (1913–1983), American football player
- James Steen (planter) (1734–1780), American planter
- James Steen (water polo) (1876–1949), American water polo player
- James Steen (politician) (died 1862), reeve of Fitzroy township, Ontario
- Jim Steen, swimming coach
- James Steen (journalist), journalist and author
