= Blacksburg =

Blacksburg may refer to:

- Blacksburg, South Carolina
- Blacksburg, Virginia
