= Mountain Island Educational State Forest =

Protected area in North Carolina, United States

- IUCN category VI (protected area with sustainable use of natural resources)
- Location within North Carolina
- Location: Lincoln & Gaston, North Carolina, United States
- Coordinates: 35°23′15″N 080°59′21″W
- Area: 2,000 acres (8.1 km^{2})
- Named for: Mountain Island Lake
- Governing body: North Carolina Forest Service
- Website: Mountain Island Educational State Forest

Mountain Island Educational State Forest (MIESF) is a 2,000-acre (8.1 km^{2}) North Carolina State Forest in Mount Holly, North Carolina.

== Nearby state parks ==
The following state parks and state forests are within 30 miles (48 km) of Mountain Island Educational State Forest:

Crowders Mountain State Park
Kings Mountain State Park, South Carolina
Lake Norman State Park
