= Fort Prince =

- Wellford, South Carolina, U.S.

Site information
- Controlled by: James Steen

Location
- Location within South Carolina
- Coordinates: 34°58′08.4″N 82°02′56″W
- Height: 15 ft.

Site history
- Built: 1756-1761
- Materials: Timber
- Battles/wars: Battle of Fort Prince

Fort Prince was built in Spartanburg County, South Carolina for protection against the Cherokee Indians. (Note: "The frequent murders and robberies of the Indians led to the building of three forts: one near Timmon's Old Field, called Prince's Fort; another in the fork of Middle and North river, on the plantation owned (in 1854) by Mr. David Anderson, called Nichol's Fort, from the name of the resident of the place; the third on Fairforest, at what was then called Poole's Iron-works, but now Bivingsville. They were block-houses, consisting of a few log cabins, notched down so closely and otherwise secured as to be impervious to a rifle-ball save at the port-holes. These forts were built previous to the Declaration of Independence.") It was near the residence of a Mr. Prince. Fort Prince was the general rallying point in times of danger when the people of the settlement sought safety. Just in front was a creek for their washing. Nearby stood a mill which ground corn, later known as Grays Mill. There was a Battle of Fort Prince during the American Revolutionary War, when Edward Hampton drove the British from the fort on July 15, 1780, and it stood for several years after.

== Size and Shape ==
Fort Prince, circular in shape, was constructed of heavy logs. It was 150 ft (46 m) in diameter and 15 ft (4.6 m) high. Port holes were cut for use by riflemen, and it was surrounded by a ditch, the dirt from which was thrown against the walls to parapet height. In 1777 Fort Prince was commanded by Captain James Steen (promoted to lieutenant colonel by 1780), of Thicketty, South Carolina (Thicketty Creek).

== Location ==
Various descriptions of location exist, all written years later. One places the fort 2 1/2 miles northeast of the present village Fair Forest on Fairforest Creek, a branch of the Tyger River, Ninety Six District, Union County, South Carolina. This may be an earlier fort by a similar name, whose location was covered in 1971 by a new lake.

A second description locates it as southwest of the city of Union, South Carolina where the road SC49 crosses over Fairforest Creek on a commanding height of land beside Gray's creek, a branch of the Tyger River.

Blackstock Road ran beside the Fort and intersected with the road to Earlesville, now known as Landrum, South Carolina. To the southeast, it became Charles Town Road.

The site of Fort Prince is shown on the 1858 Geognostic Map of Spartanburg District (by Oscar Lieber) as on the Blackstock Road near the North Tyger River and Nazareth Church. This map is available in the South Carolina Archives.

== Directions to the Fort Prince Cemetery ==
I-85 to Exit 68, then take Hwy 129 South towards Greer to first right turn onto Fort Prince Road. Go about 1/4 mile on Fort Prince Road, see Cemetery on left. D.A.R. marker is in the cornfield - hard to find. Across Rt. 129 from cemetery is bicentennial marker erected by Wellford Bicentennial Committee in 1977.
