= Kings Mountain State Park =

State park in South Carolina, United States

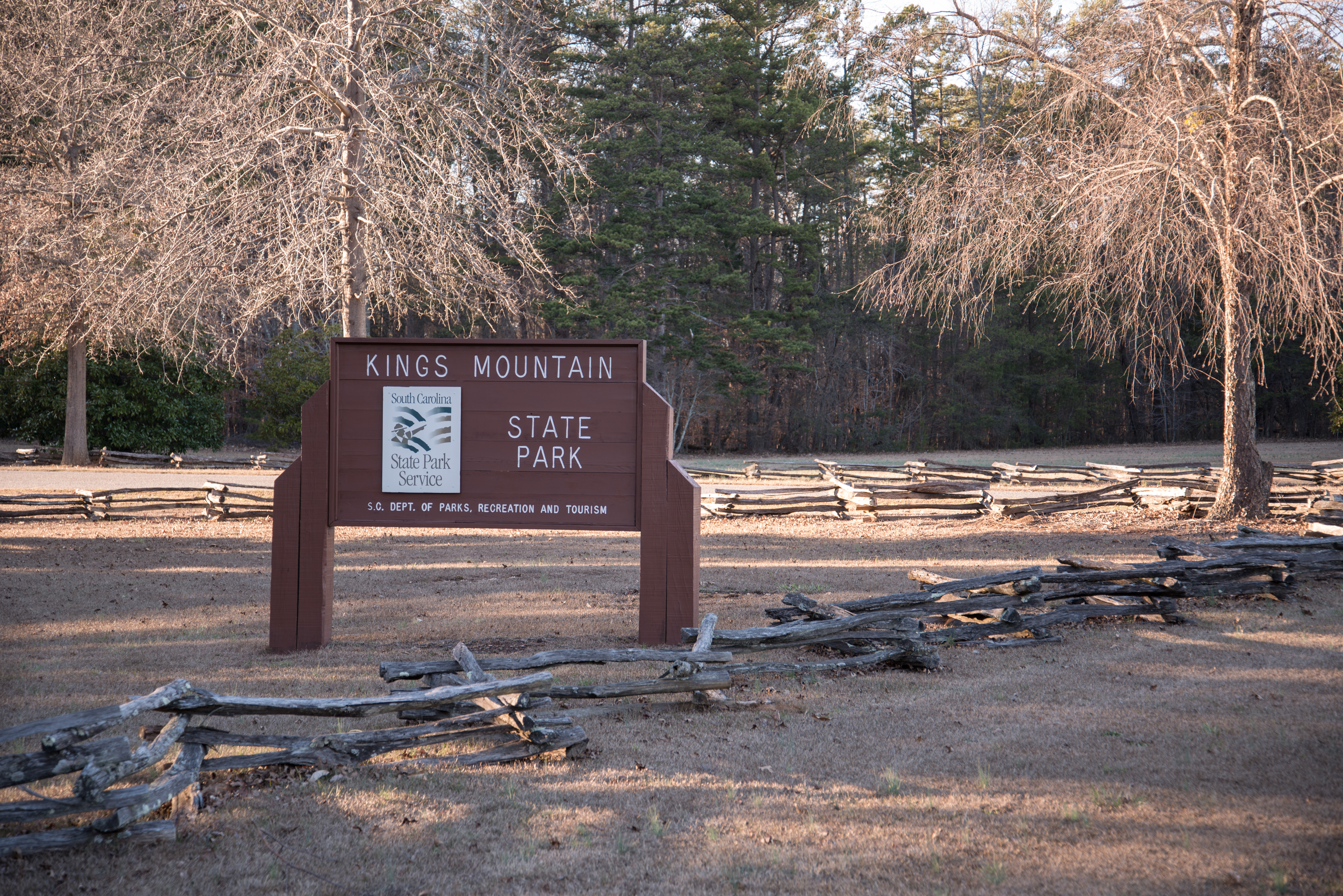
- The entrance on SC 161 to Kings Mountain State Park near Blacksburg, SC

- Location within South Carolina Location within the United States
- Location: York County, South Carolina
- Coordinates: 35°07′50″N 81°20′44″W
- Area: 6,885 acres (2,786.3 ha)
- Created: 1934
- Camp sites: Packed gravel with electric and water as well as tent sites with central water.
- Hiking trails: 16 miles (26 km)
- Other information: Features include:Two fishing lakes, nature trails, a living history farm, johnboat, canoe, and cabin rentals
- Kings Mountain State Park Historic District
- U.S. National Register of Historic Places
- U.S. Historic district
- Area: 6,883 acres (2,785.5 ha)
- Built: 1936
- Architect: Civilian Conservation Corps
- Architectural style: Late 19th And Early 20th Century American Movements, Rustic Parkitecture
- MPS: South Carolina State Parks MPS
- NRHP reference No.: 08000185
- Added to NRHP: March 14, 2008

Kings Mountain State Park is a South Carolina state park located in the Piedmont region of South Carolina. It is situated in York County near the city of Blacksburg, about 40 miles (64 km) southwest of Charlotte, North Carolina near Interstate 85.

This large hilly park includes the Living History Farm, which is representative of a typical early 19th-century Piedmont farm. It includes a barn, cotton gin, blacksmith, and carpenter shop.

The park also surrounds 65-acre (26 ha) Lake York as well as the smaller Lake Crawford.

The park has connecting trails to the adjoining Kings Mountain National Military Park and Crowders Mountain State Park.

== History ==
6,141 acres (2,485 ha) of this park were donated in 1934 by the U.S. Government. An additional 744 acres (301 ha) were donated and purchased in 1995. The park was largely developed by the Civilian Conservation Corps. The Kings Mountain State Park Historic District was named to the National Register of Historic Places in 2008.

== Fees ==
- Admission, $3 adults; $1.50 SC seniors; $1 children age 6–15; age 5 & younger free
- Camping, $17 – $22 per day
- Fishing boat rentals, $10.00 per half day & $20.00 per full day

== Nearby state parks ==
The following state parks and state forests are within 30 miles (48 km) of Kings Mountain State Park:

Croft State Park
Crowders Mountain State Park, North Carolina
Mountain Island Educational State Forest, North Carolina
South Mountains State Park, North Carolina

== See also ==
- Open-air museum
- List of South Carolina state parks
- National Register of Historic Places listings in South Carolina
