= Crowders Mountain State Park =

State park in North Carolina, United States

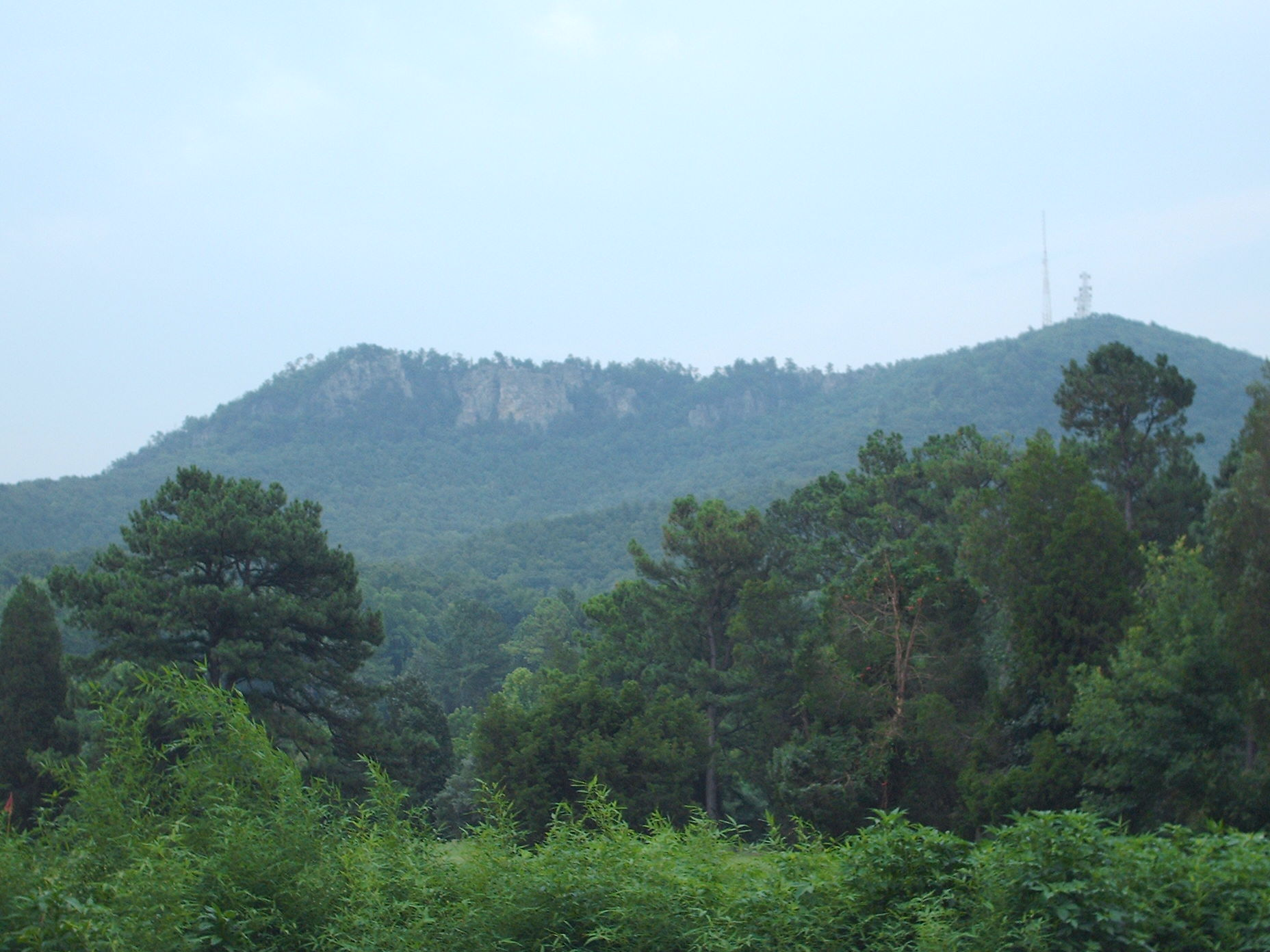
- Crowders Mountain

- Location within North Carolina Location within the United States
- Interactive map of Crowders Mountain State Park
- Location: Gaston County, North Carolina, United States
- Coordinates: 35°12′48″N 81°17′37″W
- Area: 5,217 acres (2,111 ha)
- Elevation: 1,385 ft (422 m)
- Established: 1973
- Administrator: North Carolina Division of Parks and Recreation
- Website: Official website

Crowders Mountain State Park is a 5,217-acre (21.11 km^{2}) North Carolina state park in Gaston County, North Carolina in the United States. It is near Kings Mountain, North Carolina and on the outskirts of Gastonia, North Carolina, it includes the peaks of Crowder's Mountain and The Pinnacle. Crowders Mountain is named for Crowders Creek which originates near its base. The cliffs are a popular destination for rock climbers.

== Features ==
The mountain itself is a monadnock, an isolated erosional remnant that rises abruptly from the surrounding plain. Geologically, Crowders Mountain and The Pinnacle are Class 6 mountains, defined as rising at least 984 feet (300 m) above the lowest point within a 4.35 miles (7.00 km) radius. Crowders Mountain sharply rises some 800 feet (240 m) above the surrounding countryside, and presents sheer rock cliffs that are 100 - 150 feet (46 m) in height. The mountain rises to 1,625 feet (495 m) above sea level, which is barely more than the 984 feet (300 m) above the surrounding terrain needed to qualify it as a true mountain, given that the lowest point within a 4.35 miles (7.00 km) radius is slightly less than 640 feet (200 m) above sea level and located along Crowders Creek between Dickey Mill Road and Superior Stainless Road. The peak is believed to be the remnant of a much higher mountain which formed some 400 - 500 million years ago and was gradually worn down by the elements. The park sets at the northeast end of the Kings Mountain Range, a 16-mile (26 km) long range of low peaks which include the site of the Battle of Kings Mountain of the American Revolution. The Pinnacle qualifies somewhat more solidly as a true mountain than Crowders Mountain does despite the lowest point within 4.35 miles (7.00 km) being more than 640 feet (200 m) (but still well under 680 feet (210 m)) above sea level, owing to its higher overall elevation producing a more than 1,025 feet (312 m) elevation difference with the lowest nearby point along South Crowders Creek.

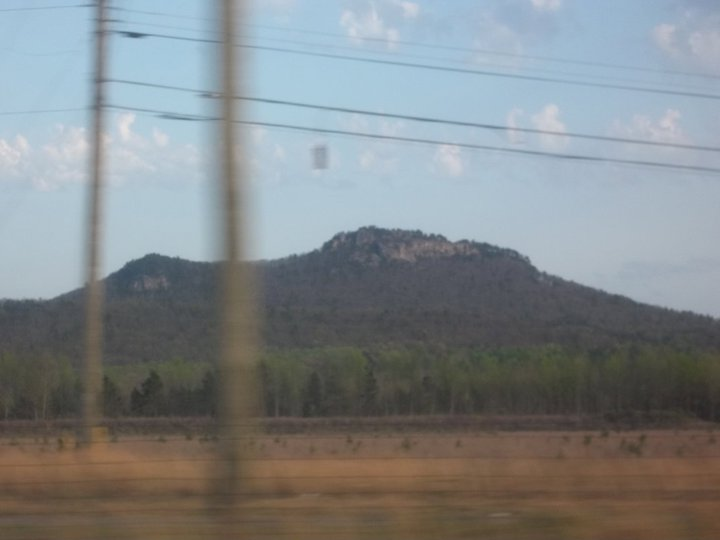
The Pinnacle

The park contains two named peaks:

- Crowders Mountain, 1,625 feet (495 m), is in the northeastern section of the park. 35.232350°N 81.276439°W
- The Pinnacle, 1,705 feet (520 m), is in the western section of the park. 35.207817°N 81.312626°W

The park features a Visitors Center.

== History ==
Buffalo herds grazed much of the land, which was prairie, before European settlers inhabited the land. The Cherokee Indians had a trading route that crossed Crowders Mountain, and the peaks marked boundaries between the hunting lands of the Catawba and Cherokee Indians.

In the early 1970s, a mining company conducted exploratory sampling on the mountain as preparation to purchase the mineral rights. Thanks to grassroots efforts by local citizens, educational institutions, and organizations, the state government was convinced that the area should be set aside and protected due to significant natural communities, plants and animals, intrinsic beauty, and unique recreational opportunities. In 1973, the State of North Carolina officially designated the area as Crowders Mountain State Park, and it opened to the public in 1974. The Pinnacle was added to the park in 1987. Another 2,000 acres (8.1 km^{2}) was added in the year 2000 and officially connected the park with Kings Mountain State Park and Kings Mountain National Military Park, both in South Carolina.

== Trails ==
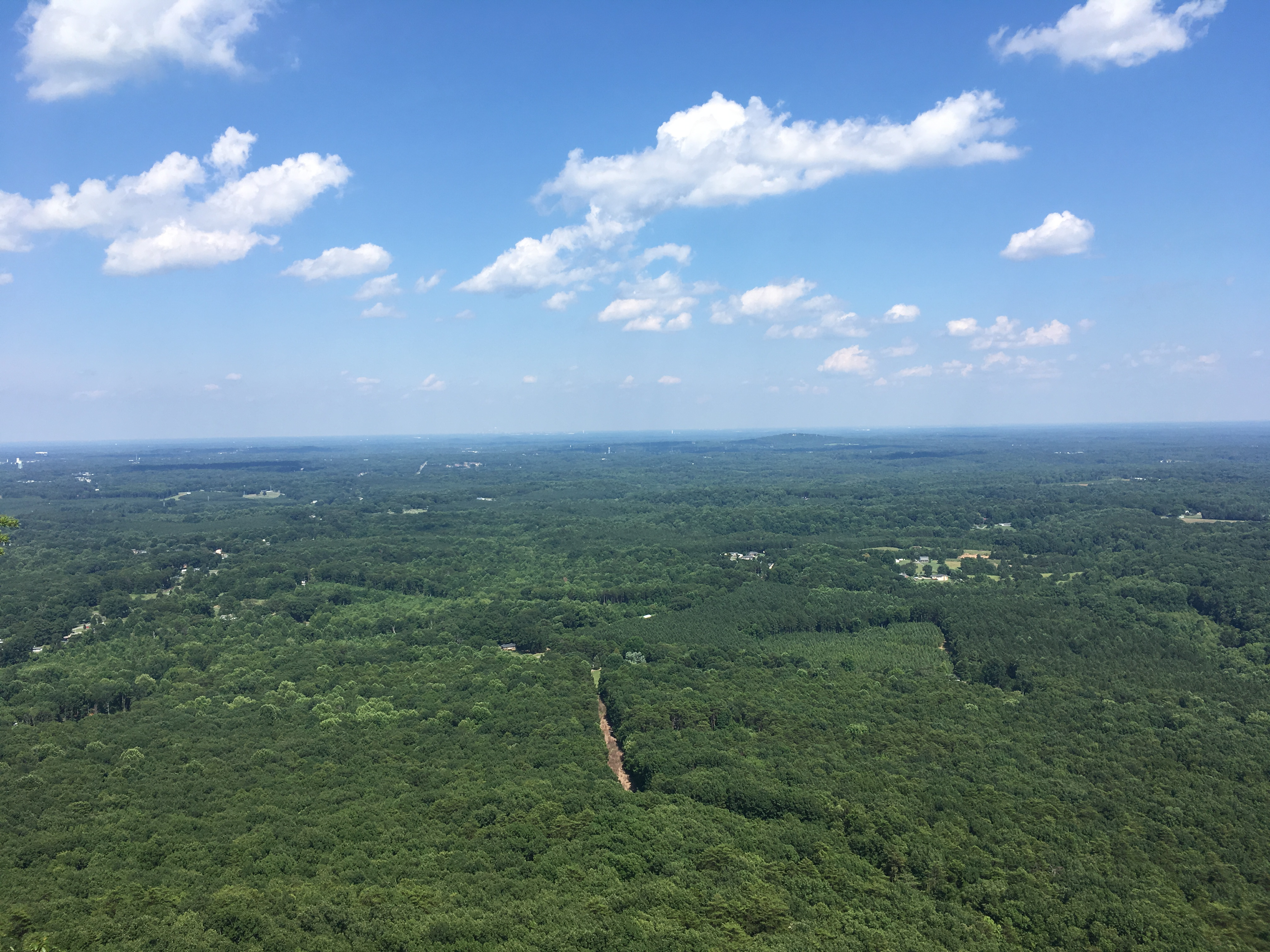
View from the summit of Crowders Mountain

Three hiking trails and one vehicle access trail lead to the summit of Crowders Mountain, and from the summit it is possible on a clear day to see the skyscrapers of Charlotte, North Carolina to the east.

- Crowders Trail - Strenuous, 2.5 miles (4.0 km). This trail winds along the base of Crowders Mountain from the Visitor Center in the southwest and ultimately leads to the Backside Trail and the top of the mountain in the northeast of the park.
- Backside Trail - Strenuous, 0.8 miles (1.3 km). From the Linwood Road Access Area this trail leads around the north side of the mountain where it first connects to the Crowders Trail and eventually to the top where it connects to the Rocktop Trail.
- Rocktop Trail - Strenuous, 1.4 miles (2.3 km). Admittedly the most difficult and technical trail in the park. It travels along the ridge of Crowders Mountain from the southwest where it splits from the Crowders Trail at Sparrow Springs Road. Each side has steep drop offs and unseen cliffs.
- Tower Trail - Strenuous, 1.8 miles (2.9 km). This trail begins at the Linwood Road Access Area and ends at the radio towers on Crowders Mountain. The trail is an old roadbed that begins with a gentle climb that becomes quite steep towards the end. Only official park vehicles can drive on this trail.

Two hiking trails lead to The Pinnacle.

- Pinnacle Trail - Strenuous, 2.0 miles (3.2 km). This trail begins at the Visitor Center and moves southwest to end at the summit of The Pinnacle, the highest point in Gaston County at 1,705 feet.
- Ridgeline Trail - Strenuous, 6.2 miles (10.0 km). Hikers must register before hiking this trail. The longest trail in the park, it starts below The Pinnacle off of Pinnacle Trail, following the ridgeline south all the way to the South Carolina State line. The Ridgeline trail then continues for 2.5 miles into South Carolina through Kings Mountain State Park, and terminates at the 16 mile Kings Mountain National Recreation Trail that goes through Kings Mountain State Park and Kings Mountain National Military Park.

Other park hiking trails.

- Family Camping Trail - Easy, 1.0 mile (1.6 km). This trail is accessed from the Pinnacle Trail and gives campers access to the family backpack camping area.
- Group Camping Trail - Easy, 1.1 miles (1.8 km). This trail is accessed from the Pinnacle Trail and gives campers access to the group backpack camping area.
- Fern Trail - Easy, 0.8 miles (1.3 km). This loop trail begins at picnic shelter number 1, connects with a portion of the Turnback Trail and follows a creek for some portions of the trail.
- Lake Trail - Easy, 0.8 miles (1.3 km). This loop trail circles the park lake and connects to Fern Trail.
