= Crowders Mountain =

Mountain in North Carolina, United States

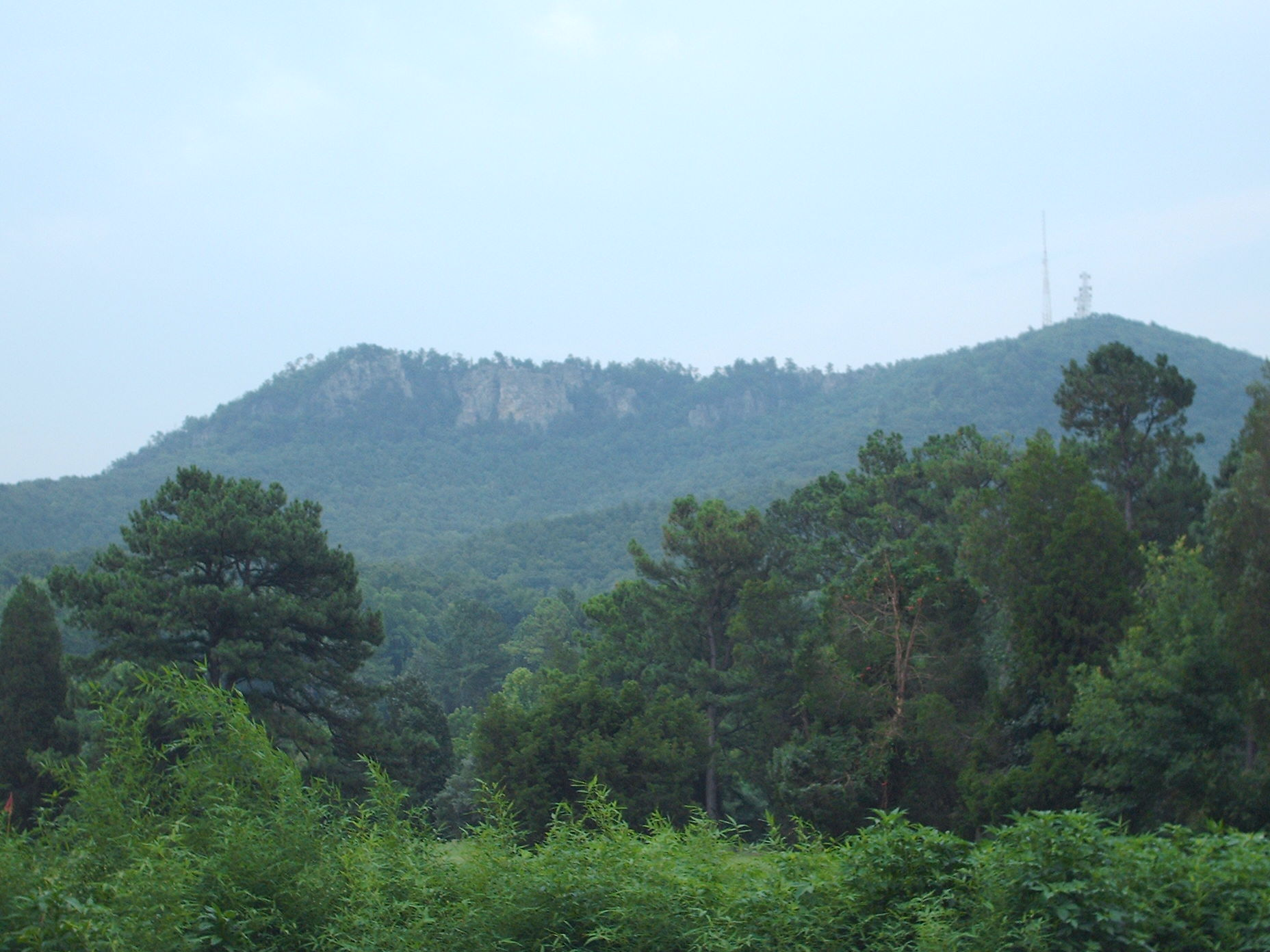
- Crowders Mountain, July 2007

Highest point
- Elevation: 1,625 ft (495 m)
- Coordinates: 35.232350°N 81.276439°W

Geography
- Location: Gaston County, North Carolina, U.S.
- Topo map(s): USGS Kings Mountain, NC

Crowders Mountain is one of two main peaks within Crowders Mountain State Park, the other peak being The Pinnacle. The park is located in the Western Piedmont of North Carolina between the cities of Kings Mountain and Gastonia or about 25 miles (40 km) west of Charlotte. Crowders Mountain abruptly rises nearly 800 feet (240 m) above the surrounding terrain, and has an elevation of 1,625 feet (495 m) above sea level.

The monadnock is named for Crowders Creek, which originates near its base. The original namesake of Crowders Creek is unknown, but most likely lived farther south along Crowders Creek. Crowders Mountain and The Pinnacle, located to the southwest, once served as markers to separate the hunting grounds of the Catawba and Cherokee peoples.

In the early 1970s, a mining company began doing exploratory sampling of areas along what is now the Backside Trail with the intent of purchasing the minerals rights to excavate the mountain for kyanite, barite, and iron. This led local concerned citizens, educational institutions, and local governments to join together and convince state government pursue the creation of a state park in order to protect the area.

In 1973 the State of North Carolina created Crowders Mountain State Park. It opened to the public in 1974. Crowders Mountain proper was added to the new park in 1978. The Pinnacle was added in 1987. In the year 2000, 2000+ acres were purchased. In 2016 797,553 people were reported to visit the park. This purchase brought the entire ridge line of Kings Mountain into the park and took park boundaries to the North Carolina/South Carolina state line. Both monadnocks present sheer rock cliffs which are 100–150 feet (30–46 m) in height. The cliffs of Crowders Mountain are popular among rock climbers. Rock climbing is no longer permitted on The Pinnacle. Hiking trails lead to both summits, from which it is possible to view the skyscrapers of nearby Charlotte, North Carolina, on a clear day.

== Communications center ==
One of the first FM radio stations in North Carolina, Gastonia's WGNC-FM, erected a transmission tower on Crowders Mountain in the late 1940s. Today three radio towers are located on the mountain. The transmitters are located within a 12,197-square-foot (1,133.1 m^{2}) plot of land on the summit that remains privately owned. In addition to commercial radio, the towers relay signals for wireless phone companies, railroads and local emergency services.

On June 19, 2007, the Gastonia City Council denied a request to add 107 feet (33 m) to a 143-foot (44 m) communications tower on Crowders Mountain. Crown Castle International had requested the change to allow the signal of a Spanish-language radio station in Gaffney, South Carolina, to reach Charlotte.

The council cited concerns that the taller tower would damage views of the mountain and that construction equipment would harm the mountain's environment.

The tallest tower on the mountain is owned by CBS Communications and rises 268 feet (82 m).
