= Macedonia, South Carolina =

Unincorporated community in South Carolina, US

Macedonia is an unincorporated community in Cherokee County, South Carolina, United States. Its elevation is 879 feet (268 m), and it is located at 35°4′14″N 81°45′37″W.
