= Brown's Mountain =

Mountain in Cherokee County, South Carolina, United States

Highest point
- Elevation: 1,035 ft (315 m)
- Coordinates: 35.131521°N 81.405085°W

Geography
- Location: Cherokee County, South Carolina, U.S.
- Topo map: Brown's Mountain Topo Map

Brown's Mountain is a mountain in Cherokee County in the state of South Carolina, United States. Brown's Mountain summit is at an elevation of 1,035 feet (315 meters) above sea level. The mountain is one of the three main mountain summits of Kings Mountain National Military Park and is the highest in the park. The other mountain summits are Joes Mountain and Kings Mountain.
