= Cherokee County, South Carolina =

County in South Carolina, United States

- County
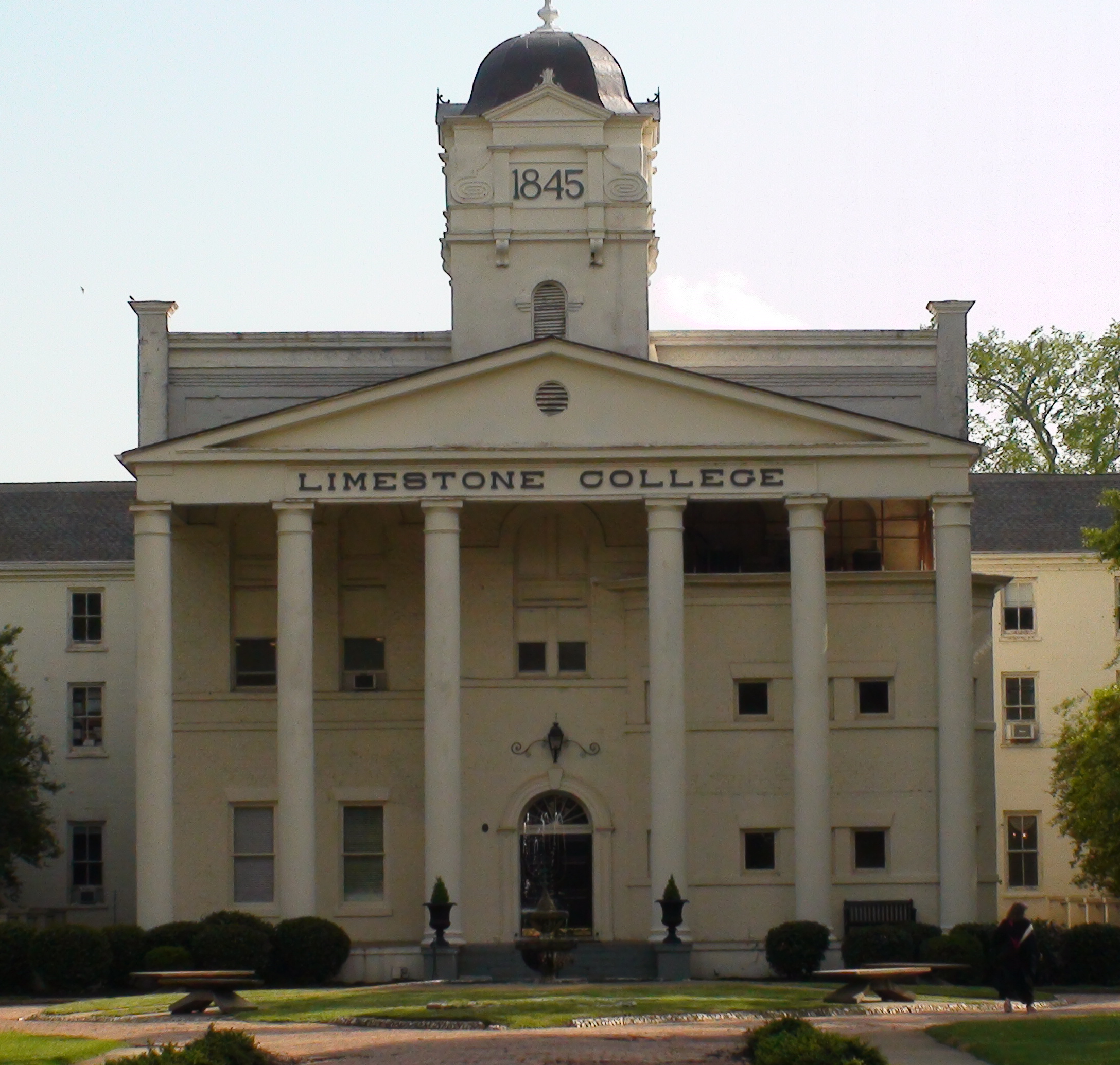
- Limestone College at Limestone Springs Historic District in Gaffney

- Flag Seal

- Location within the U.S. state of South Carolina
- Interactive map of Cherokee County, South Carolina
- Coordinates: 35.05°N 81.61°W
- Country: United States
- State: South Carolina
- Founded: 1897
- Named for: Cherokee Indians
- Seat: Gaffney
- Largest community: Gaffney

Area
  - Total: 397.47 sq mi (1,029.4 km^{2})
  - Land: 392.96 sq mi (1,017.8 km^{2})
  - Water: 4.51 sq mi (11.7 km^{2}) 1.13%

Population (2020)
  - Total: 56,216
  - Estimate (2025): 58,275 ▲
  - Density: 143.06/sq mi (55.235/km^{2})
- Time zone: UTC−5 (Eastern)
  - Summer (DST): UTC−4 (EDT)
- Congressional district: 5th
- Website: cherokeecountysc.gov

Cherokee County is a county in the U.S. state of South Carolina. As of the 2020 census, the population was 56,216. The county seat is Gaffney. The county was formed in 1897 from parts of York, Union, and Spartanburg counties. It was named for the Cherokee people who historically occupied this area prior to European encounter. Cherokee County comprises the Gaffney, SC Micropolitan Statistical Area, which is also included in the Greenville-Spartanburg-Anderson, SC Combined Statistical Area.

== History ==
This area was occupied for thousands of years by indigenous peoples and by the historic Cherokee people before the arrival of Europeans.

When European traders and settlers entered the area, they used the existing Native American paths: called collectively the Trading Path. The Upper Road and Lower Cherokee Traders Path were paths that passed through the piedmont. The former connected to Fredericksburg, Virginia, leading from the Virginia Tidewater, into the Piedmont, and continue down further South.

The Lower Cherokee Traders Path especially connected areas in present-day western North Carolina, upstate South Carolina and northeastern Georgia. In the mid-18th century, waves of British migrants and immigrants, an estimated 250,000 people, traveled by these paths into Cherokee and neighboring counties in the piedmont. This backcountry area was initially settled especially by immigrant Ulster Scots people, along with Germans and Anglo-Americans migrating into the area. Up until the mid-19th century, plantations were developed in the county. Enslaved African-Americans, for their labor, and as “property,” were the basis of the county's economy until the end of the Civil War.

During the American Revolutionary War, the Battle of Cowpens was fought on January 17, 1781, in northwestern Cherokee County, north of the town of Cowpens, South Carolina, an engagement in the American Revolution's southern theatre resulting in a Patriot victory.

== Geography ==
According to the U.S. Census Bureau, the county has a total area of 397.47 square miles (1,029.4 km^{2}), of which 392.96 square miles (1,017.8 km^{2}) is land and 4.51 square miles (11.7 km^{2}) (1.13%) is water. It is the third-smallest county in South Carolina by land area and fourth-smallest by total area.

=== Mountain peaks ===
- Draytonville Mountain
- Brown's Mountain
- Thicketty Mountain
- Whitaker Mountain

Draytonville Mountain is known to locals as McKown's Mountain, named for a farmer who owned much of the land in that area.

=== Major water bodies ===
- Broad River
- McKowns Creek
- Pacolet River

=== National protected areas ===
- Cowpens National Battlefield
- Kings Mountain National Military Park (part)

=== State and local protected areas/sites ===
- London Creek Wildlife Management Area
- Magness-Humphries House
- Peachoid

=== Adjacent counties ===
- Cleveland County, North Carolina – north
- York County – east
- Union County – south
- Spartanburg County – west
- Rutherford County, North Carolina – northwest

== Demographics ==
Historical population
Census	Pop.	Note	%±
1900	21,359		—
1910	26,179		22.6%
1920	27,570		5.3%
1930	32,201		16.8%
1940	33,290		3.4%
1950	34,992		5.1%
1960	35,205		0.6%
1970	36,791		4.5%
1980	40,983		11.4%
1990	44,506		8.6%
2000	52,537		18.0%
2010	55,342		5.3%
2020	56,216		1.6%
2025 (est.)	58,275	▲	3.7%
U.S. Decennial Census; 1790–1960 1900–1990; 1990–2000 2010 2020

=== Racial and ethnic composition ===
Cherokee County, South Carolina – Racial and ethnic composition Note: the US Census treats Hispanic/Latino as an ethnic category. This table excludes Latinos from the racial categories and assigns them to a separate category. Hispanics/Latinos may be of any race.
Race / Ethnicity (NH = Non-Hispanic)	Pop 1980	Pop 1990	Pop 2000	Pop 2010	Pop 2020	% 1980	% 1990	% 2000	% 2010	% 2020
White alone (NH)	32,639	34,873	40,013	40,939	39,576	79.64%	78.36%	76.16%	73.97%	70.40%
Black or African American alone (NH)	7,894	9,120	10,751	11,214	11,292	19.26%	20.49%	20.46%	20.26%	20.09%
Native American or Alaska Native alone (NH)	38	63	95	129	161	0.09%	0.14%	0.18%	0.23%	0.29%
Asian alone (NH)	85	186	162	308	341	0.21%	0.42%	0.31%	0.56%	0.61%
Native Hawaiian or Pacific Islander alone (NH)	x	x	9	6	14	x	x	0.02%	0.01%	0.02%
Other race alone (NH)	15	5	13	49	195	0.04%	0.01%	0.02%	0.09%	0.35%
Mixed race or Multiracial (NH)	x	x	402	665	1,860	x	x	0.77%	1.20%	3.31%
Hispanic or Latino (any race)	312	259	1,092	2,032	2,777	0.76%	0.58%	2.08%	3.67%	4.94%
Total	40,983	44,506	52,537	55,342	56,216	100.00%	100.00%	100.00%	100.00%	100.00%

=== 2020 census ===
As of the 2020 census, there were 56,216 people, 22,349 households, and 11,592 families residing in the county.

The median age was 40.8 years, with 22.5% of residents under the age of 18 and 17.9% of residents 65 years of age or older. For every 100 females there were 95.8 males, and for every 100 females age 18 and over there were 92.7 males.

According to the 2020 census, 71.5% of the population identified as White, 20.2% as Black or African American, 0.4% as American Indian and Alaska Native, 0.6% as Asian, 0.0% as Native Hawaiian and Pacific Islander, 2.8% as some other race, and 4.5% as two or more races; Hispanic or Latino residents of any race comprised 4.9% of the population.

33.9% of residents lived in urban areas, while 66.1% lived in rural areas.

Of the 22,349 households, 30.3% had children under the age of 18 living with them and 30.5% had a female householder with no spouse or partner present. About 28.5% of all households were made up of individuals and 12.3% had someone living alone who was 65 years of age or older.

There were 24,713 housing units, of which 9.6% were vacant. Among occupied housing units, 68.6% were owner-occupied and 31.4% were renter-occupied. The homeowner vacancy rate was 1.2% and the rental vacancy rate was 8.9%.

=== 2010 census ===
At the 2010 census, there were 55,342 people, 21,519 households, and 14,941 families residing in the county. The population density was 140.9 inhabitants per square mile (54.4/km^{2}). There were 23,997 housing units at an average density of 61.1 per square mile (23.6/km^{2}). The racial makeup of the county was 75.0% white, 20.4% black or African American, 0.6% Asian, 0.4% American Indian, 2.2% from other races, and 1.4% from two or more races. Those of Hispanic or Latino origin made up 3.7% of the population. In terms of ancestry, 14.7% were American, 9.7% were Irish, 6.6% were English, and 6.5% were German.

Of the 21,519 households, 35.1% had children under the age of 18 living with them, 46.2% were married couples living together, 17.4% had a female householder with no husband present, 30.6% were non-families, and 25.8% of all households were made up of individuals. The average household size was 2.54 and the average family size was 3.03. The median age was 38.3 years.

The median income for a household in the county was $34,132 and the median income for a family was $46,164. Males had a median income of $39,048 versus $27,390 for females. The per capita income for the county was $17,862. About 14.3% of families and 19.5% of the population were below the poverty line, including 27.5% of those under age 18 and 11.0% of those age 65 or over.

=== 2000 census ===
At the 2000 census, there were 52,537 people, 20,495 households, and 14,612 families residing in the county. The population density was 134 people per square mile (52 people/km^{2}). There were 22,400 housing units at an average density of 57 per square mile (22/km^{2}). The racial makeup of the county was 76.92% White, 20.56% Black or African American, 0.20% Native American, 0.31% Asian, 0.02% Pacific Islander, 1.16% from other races, and 0.84% from two or more races. 2.08% of the population were Hispanic or Latino of any race. 39.1% were of "American", 6.8% Irish, 5.8% English and 5.6% German ancestry according to Census 2000. Most of those claiming "American" ancestry are of Scots-Irish and/or English descent, but have family who have been in the country for so long, that they no longer differentiate such national origins and choose to identify simply as "American".

There were 20,495 households, out of which 32.70% had children under the age of 18 living with them, 51.30% were married couples living together, 15.40% had a female householder with no husband present, and 28.70% were non-families. 25.00% of all households were made up of individuals, and 9.40% had someone living alone who was 65 years of age or older. The average household size was 2.53 and the average family size was 3.01.

In the county, the population was spread out, with 25.80% under the age of 18, 9.00% from 18 to 24, 29.60% from 25 to 44, 23.20% from 45 to 64, and 12.40% who were 65 years of age or older. The median age was 35 years. For every 100 females there were 93.80 males. For every 100 females age 18 and over, there were 90.70 males.

The median income for a household in the county was $33,787, and the median income for a family was $39,393. Males had a median income of $30,984 versus $21,298 for females. The per capita income for the county was $16,421. About 11.00% of families and 23.90% of the population were below the poverty line, including 16.90% of those under age 18 and 15.20% of those age 65 or over.

== Government and politics ==
Like the rest of northwest South Carolina, Cherokee County has been a Republican stronghold since the Reagan era, and increasingly so in recent years. Each presidential election from 2016 onward has broken the record for the strongest Republican support in the county since 1972.

United States presidential election results for Cherokee County, South Carolina
Year	Republican		Democratic		Third party(ies)	
Year	No.	%	No.	%	No.	%
1900	59	5.16%	1,084	94.84%	0	0.00%
1904	31	2.02%	1,507	97.98%	0	0.00%
1912	16	1.25%	1,259	98.21%	7	0.55%
1916	13	0.99%	1,271	96.36%	35	2.65%
1920	48	2.64%	1,771	97.36%	0	0.00%
1924	24	1.97%	1,186	97.53%	6	0.49%
1928	89	6.03%	1,388	93.97%	0	0.00%
1932	37	1.54%	2,363	98.38%	2	0.08%
1936	23	1.00%	2,280	99.00%	0	0.00%
1940	36	1.71%	2,069	98.29%	0	0.00%
1944	68	3.95%	1,620	94.13%	33	1.92%
1948	77	4.38%	605	34.41%	1,076	61.21%
1952	1,529	21.61%	5,545	78.39%	0	0.00%
1956	907	18.50%	3,687	75.21%	308	6.28%
1960	1,565	22.50%	5,391	77.50%	0	0.00%
1964	3,627	46.00%	4,258	54.00%	0	0.00%
1968	2,853	27.19%	1,998	19.04%	5,642	53.77%
1972	7,570	77.24%	2,107	21.50%	123	1.26%
1976	3,931	33.51%	7,765	66.19%	36	0.31%
1980	5,379	43.32%	6,889	55.48%	150	1.21%
1984	8,655	67.57%	4,101	32.02%	53	0.41%
1988	7,763	63.89%	4,322	35.57%	66	0.54%
1992	6,887	47.31%	5,453	37.46%	2,217	15.23%
1996	6,689	49.04%	5,821	42.68%	1,129	8.28%
2000	9,900	60.65%	6,138	37.60%	285	1.75%
2004	12,090	64.60%	6,466	34.55%	158	0.84%
2008	13,305	64.07%	7,215	34.74%	246	1.18%
2012	13,314	64.09%	7,231	34.81%	228	1.10%
2016	15,167	69.70%	6,092	28.00%	500	2.30%
2020	18,043	71.40%	6,983	27.63%	244	0.97%
2024	18,697	75.27%	5,939	23.91%	203	0.82%

== Economy ==
Cherokee County is the only county to have three national parks within its boundaries: the Overmountain Victory National Historic Trail, Kings Mountain National Military Park and Cowpens National Battlefield. Several historic homes dot the landscape of Cherokee County. While many are not generally open to the public, several annual tours of these homes take place.

Gaffney Little Theatre and Limestone College serve theater enthusiasts, offering plays and musicals ten to twelve times a year.

Located outside the city of Gaffney is the Cherokee Speedway, a 3/8th mile dirt racing track that hosts several short track stock car racing events. Originally constructed in the 1950s, it has had notable early racecar drivers like Bobby Isaac and Curtis Turner compete there.

A major shopping center is Prime Outlets-Gaffney, which attracts almost 3,000,000 visitors per year, and contains over 80 retail outlets. Floyd Baker Boulevard is a major commercial area in Gaffney. It has numerous stores and restaurants. Uptown Gaffney offers many upscale boutiques, shops and cafes.

The area's newest attraction is the Cherokee County History and Arts Museum. It is located at the old Central School. Cherokee County's history, its contributions to the arts, and its role in shaping the culture of the southeast are explored.

In 2022, the GDP of Cherokee County was $2.1 billion (roughly $37,764 per capita). In chained 2017 dollars, the real GDP was $1.8 billion (about $31,928 per capita). Its unemployment rate has fluctuated between 3.2 and 5.3% during 2022 through 2024.

As of April 2024, Dollar Tree, Limestone University, Nestlé, Timken Company, and Walmart are some of the largest employers in the county.

Employment and Wage Statistics by Industry in Cherokee County, South Carolina
Industry	Employment Counts	Employment Percentage (%)	Average Annual Wage ($)
Accommodation and Food Services	1,739	9.5	20,384
Administrative and Support and Waste Management and Remediation Services	1,181	6.5	35,360
Agriculture, Forestry, Fishing and Hunting	13	0.1	24,336
Arts, Entertainment, and Recreation	216	1.2	26,520
Construction	755	4.1	66,300
Educational Services	1,471	8.1	51,428
Finance and Insurance	246	1.3	61,776
Health Care and Social Assistance	1,056	5.8	34,164
Information	58	0.3	36,400
Manufacturing	5,782	31.7	55,796
Other Services (except Public Administration)	418	2.3	27,664
Professional, Scientific, and Technical Services	226	1.2	62,140
Public Administration	670	3.7	44,876
Real Estate and Rental and Leasing	121	0.7	48,568
Retail Trade	2,295	12.6	27,612
Transportation and Warehousing	1,188	6.5	52,156
Utilities	175	1.0	94,900
Wholesale Trade	645	3.5	52,988
Total	18,255	100.0%	45,063

=== Nuclear power plant ===
In 2002, the President George W. Bush administration initiated the Nuclear Power 2010 Program, to encourage the development of nuclear power plants to meet energy needs. The program developed a streamlining of approval processes for licensing and had subsidies. Additional incentives were authorized under the Nuclear Power Act of 2005.

On March 16, 2006 Duke Power announced that a Cherokee County site had been selected for a potential new nuclear power plant, to be called the William States Lee III Nuclear Generating Station, informally known as Lee Station. The site is jointly owned by Duke Power and Southern Company. Duke plans to develop the site for two Westinghouse Electric Company AP1000 (advanced passive) pressurized water reactors. Each reactor is capable of producing approximately 1,117 megawatts. (See Nuclear Power 2010 Program.) This site is adjacent to the old Cherokee Nuclear Power Plant site, which was never completed and ultimately abandoned. It was used by James Cameron as a set for the 1989 film The Abyss.

On December 14, 2007 Duke Power submitted a Combined Construction and Operating License to the Nuclear Regulatory Commission, with an announcement that it will spend $160 million in 2008 on the plant with a total cost of 5–6 billion dollars. Due to a slowdown in licensing and increase in costs, a federal license for what is estimated to be an $11 billion plant is not expected until 2016. Duke Energy will decide after that point whether to go forward with construction. In August 2017, Duke Energy announced that construction plans at the site had been put on an indefinite hold. The company retains the rights to restart construction in the future.

== Transportation ==
The lifeline of Cherokee County, I-85, runs through the city limits of Gaffney. It carries traffic and trade contributing to the business development along Floyd Baker Blvd, the county's main thoroughfare, which bisects I-85. Much of the county's growth occurs along I-85.

With no airports of its own, Cherokee County is served by Charlotte Douglas International Airport and Greenville-Spartanburg International Airport. A study to determine the feasibility of building an airport in the county revealed that an airport is desperately needed by businesses. Previous studies have determined the structure of the airport and possible airport sites have been narrowed down to two sites – one located just south of Gaffney and one located outside of Blacksburg. A major economic feasibility study is now being conducted, as required for funding by the federal government. If the airport is economically viable, the government could contribute 95% of the funds needed to construct the airport, if the project is authorized by Congress. If the study fails, then no federal funding will be provided.

=== Major highways ===
- I-85
- US 29
- US 221
- US 221 Alt.
- SC 5
- SC 11
- SC 18
- SC 18 Conn.
- SC 97
- SC 105
- SC 105 Conn. (near Draytonville)
- SC 105 Conn. (Saratt)
- SC 110
- SC 150
- SC 198
- SC 211
- SC 329

== Healthcare ==
Gaffney is home to several healthcare institutions:

=== Cherokee Medical Center ===
Cherokee Medical Center, a division of Spartanburg Regional Healthcare System, is a 125-bed acute care facility located in Gaffney, S.C., that services Cherokee County and the surrounding areas. The hospital provides services including emergency, medical, surgical and imaging. Formerly Gaffney Medical Center, the hospital joined Mary Black Health System in 2015 and became Mary Black Health System – Gaffney. Mary Black facilities became part of Spartanburg Regional Healthcare System in 2019.

=== Gibbs Cancer Center and Research Institute at Gaffney ===
Based in Spartanburg, Gibbs Cancer Center & Research Institute provides comprehensive cancer care to the Upstate South Carolina community and beyond. One of four locations, Gibbs at Gaffney opened in September 2011 with the mission of providing oncology services to the Cherokee County community.

Gibbs at Gaffney provides medical oncology and infusion services.

=== Immediate Care Center – Gaffney ===
Located on Floyd Baker Boulevard, Immediate Care Center – Gaffney provides a hybrid of urgent and primary care.

=== Medical Group of the Carolinas ===
A network of more than 100 practices in Upstate South Carolina, Medical Group of the Carolinas includes several medical practices in Cherokee County. The local offices include family and internal medicine, cardiology, orthopaedics, hematology oncology, urology and women's care.

== Communities ==
=== Cities ===
- Chesnee (mostly in Spartanburg County)
- Gaffney (county seat and largest community)

=== Towns ===
- Blacksburg
- Smyrna (mostly in York County)

=== Census-designated places ===
- Cherokee Falls
- East Gaffney

=== Other unincorporated communities ===
- Cashion Crossroads
- Draytonville
- Goucher
- Grassy Pond
- Kings Creek
- Macedonia
- State Line
- Thicketty

=== Ghost towns ===
- Ezell

== See also ==
- List of counties in South Carolina
- National Register of Historic Places listings in Cherokee County, South Carolina
- Tryon County, North Carolina, former county in North Carolina which included modern-day parts of Cherokee County
