= Joes Mountain (South Carolina) =

Mountain in South Carolina, United States

Joe's Mountain

Highest point
- Elevation: 1,027 ft (313 m)
- Coordinates: 35.13541°N 81.395085°W

Geography
- Location: York County, South Carolina, U.S.
- Topo map: Joe's Mountain Topo Map

Joes Mountain is a mountain in York County in the state of South Carolina. The summit of Joes Mountain is at an elevation of 1,027 feet (313 meters) above sea level. The mountain is one of the three main mountain summits of Kings Mountain National Military Park. The other mountain summits are Brown's Mountain and Kings Mountain.
