= Limestone Springs Historic District =

Historic district in South Carolina, United States

- U.S. National Register of Historic Places
- U.S. Historic district
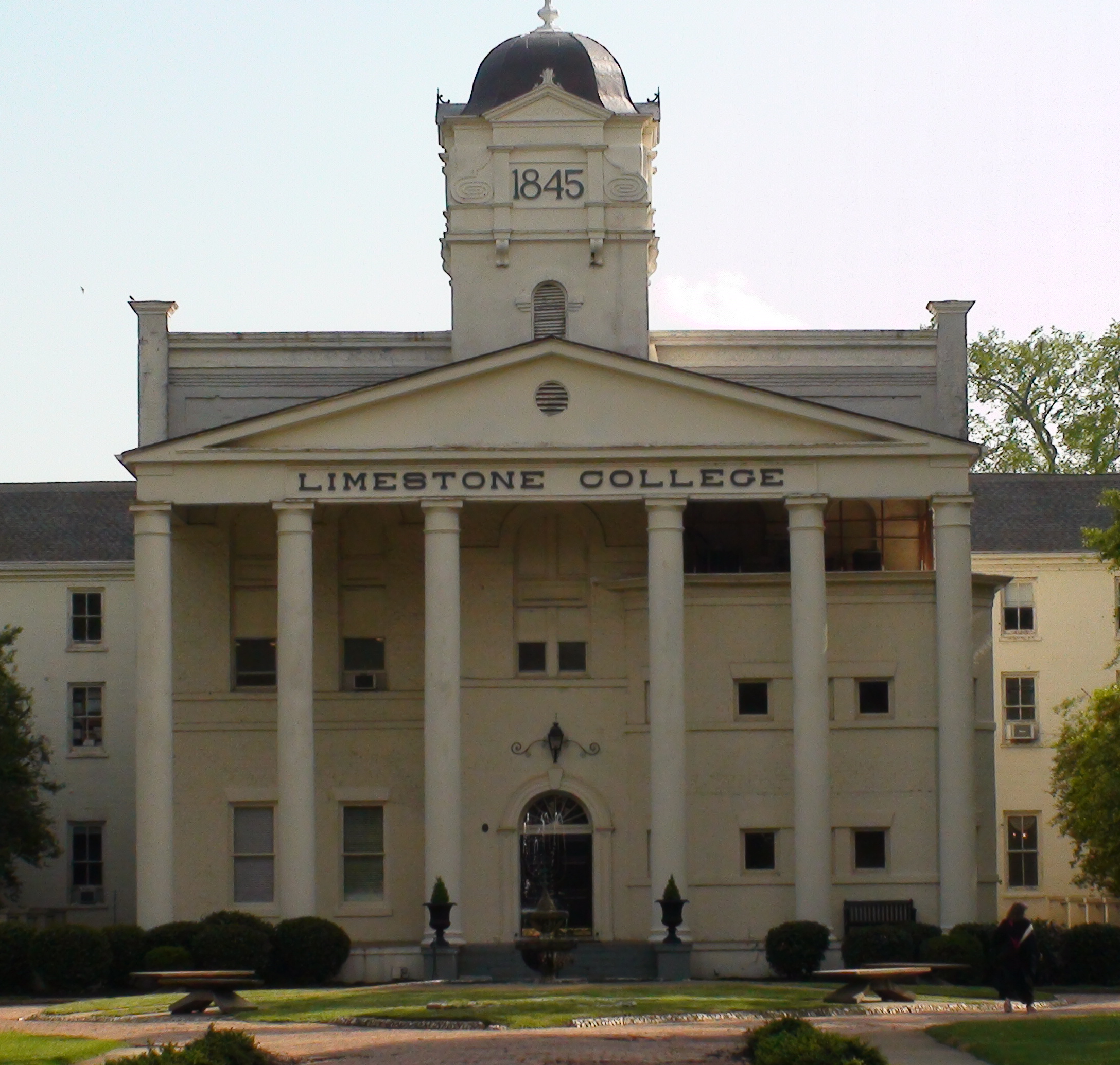
- Limestone College, May 2009

- Location within South Carolina Location within the United States
- Location: O'Neal St. extension and Limestone College campus, Gaffney, South Carolina
- Coordinates: 35°3′14″N 81°38′53″W
- Area: 12 acres (4.9 ha)
- Built: 1845
- Architectural style: Classical Revival, Gothic
- MPS: Gaffney MRA
- NRHP reference No.: 86000597
- Added to NRHP: March 27, 1986

Gaffney Residential Historic District national historic district located at Gaffney, Cherokee County, South Carolina. The district encompasses nine contributing building and 1 contributing structure in Gaffney. The focal point of the district is the historic section of Limestone College campus. The campus includes the nine buildings constructed between about 1837 and 1941. The buildings on the campus are oriented towards a central lawn and fountain. The buildings are classically inspired and include architectural styles such as Gothic Revival and Neoclassical and also a meeting house form church. Also included in the district is a limestone quarry that was mined in the 19th and early-20th century and a mid-19th century church building. The limestone quarry is located adjacent to the historic section of the campus and the Limestone Springs Baptist Church is adjacent to the quarry. Notable buildings include the separately listed Winnie Davis Hall and Limestone Springs Hotel.

It was listed on the National Register of Historic Places in 1986.
