= Winnie Davis Hall =

- U.S. National Register of Historic Places
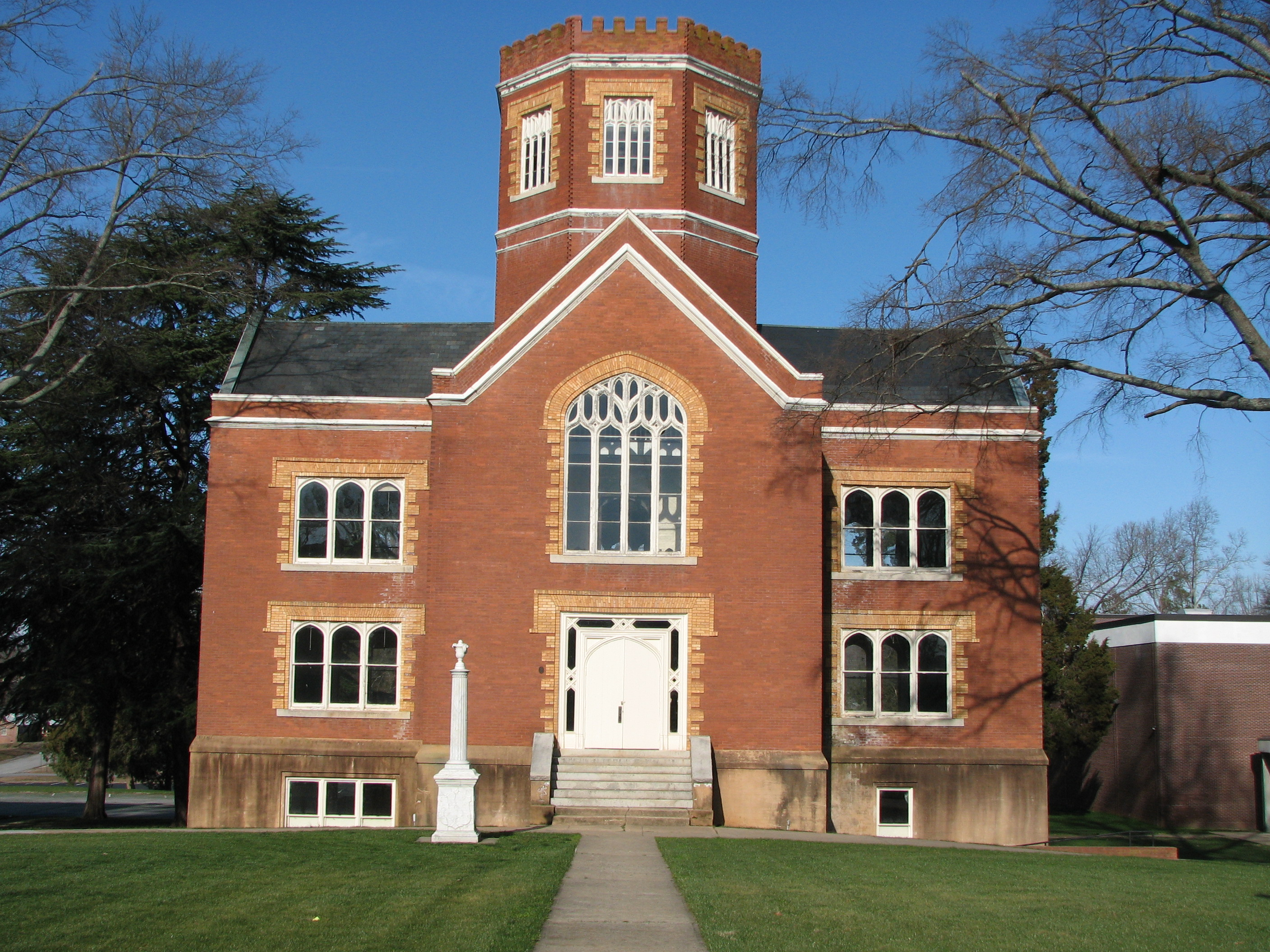

- Location within South Carolina Location within the United States
- Location: Gaffney, South Carolina
- Coordinates: 35°3′23″N 81°39′0″W
- Area: 0.3 acres (0.12 ha)
- Built: 1904
- Architect: William Augustus Edwards
- Architectural style: Late Gothic Revival
- Part of: Limestone Springs Historic District (ID86000597)
- NRHP reference No.: 77001219
- Added to NRHP: April 29, 1977

Winnie Davis Hall, built in 1904, is an historic redbrick college building on the campus of Limestone College in Gaffney, South Carolina. It was designed by Darlington native William Augustus Edwards, who designed academic buildings at 12 institutions of higher learning as well as 13 courthouses and numerous other buildings in Florida, Georgia and South Carolina. It was named for Varina "Winnie" Anne Davis, the daughter of Jefferson Davis and was built to serve as a repository for American Civil War papers as a center for the study of Southern history. On April 29, 1977, it was added to the National Register of Historic Places. It is part of the Limestone Springs Historic District and is also known as the Winnie Davis Hall of History.

== See also ==
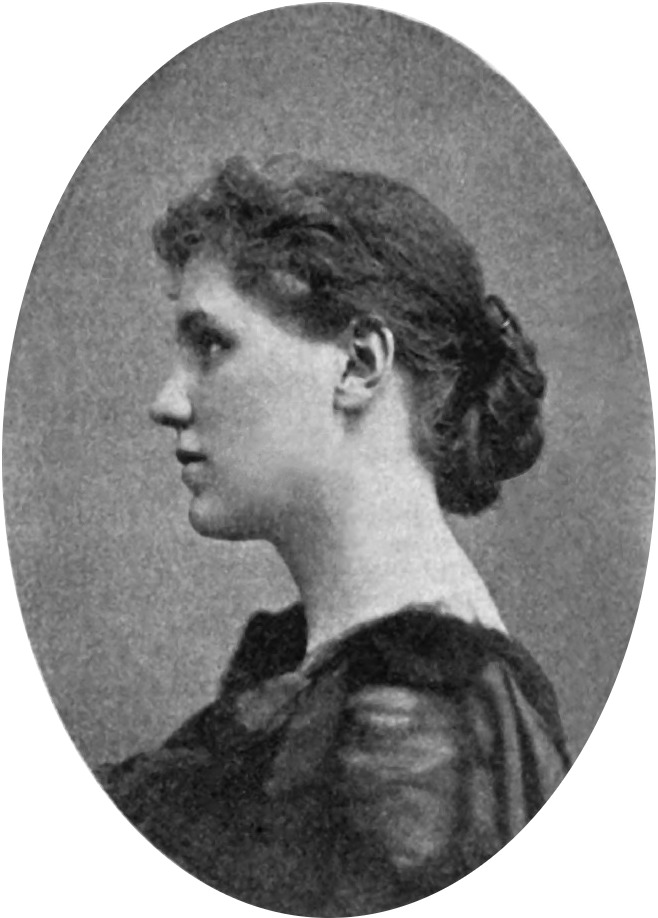

- List of Registered Historic Places in South Carolina
