= Blacksburg, South Carolina =

- Town
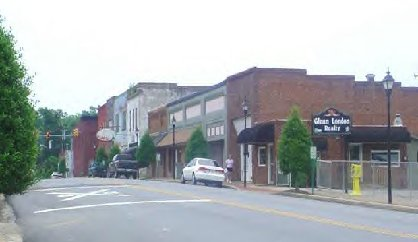
- Shelby Street in Uptown Blacksburg

- Seal
- Nickname: Iron City
- Motto: "Beginning the New Beginning"
- Location within South Carolina
- Coordinates: 35°07′32″N 81°30′57″W
- Country: United States
- State: South Carolina
- County: Cherokee
- Incorporated: 1888

Government
  - Type: Administrator-Council Government

Area
  - Town: 1.87 sq mi (4.85 km^{2})
  - Land: 1.87 sq mi (4.85 km^{2})
  - Water: 0 sq mi (0.00 km^{2})
- Elevation: 758 ft (231 m)

Population (2020)
  - Town: 1,889
  - Density: 1,009.5/sq mi (389.78/km^{2})
  - Metro: 9,655
- Time zone: UTC5 (Eastern)
  - Summer (DST): UTC-4 (EDT)
- ZIP code: 29702
- Area codes: 864, 821
- FIPS code: 45-06400
- GNIS feature ID: 2405275
- Website: www.townofblacksburgsc.com

Blacksburg is a small town in Cherokee County, South Carolina, United States. As of the 2020 census, Blacksburg had a population of 1,889. The communities of Antioch, Cherokee Falls, Kings Creek, Cashion Crossroads, Buffalo, and Mount Paran are located near the town.

Blacksburg is in Upstate South Carolina on the Interstate 85 corridor about 45 mi (72 km) southwest of Charlotte, North Carolina. It is part of the Greenville-Spartanburg-Anderson Combined Statistical Area (CSA) which has a population of 1,478,648 according to 2018 estimates by the U.S. Census Bureau.

== History ==
Located near the northern border of the state, the present-day site of Blacksburg was first settled by a man named Stark. Mr. Stark, who had lived in Charleston, South Carolina prior to moving to the area, had gotten several people to come along with him on an agriculture venture, but this venture would fail. Those who stayed behind named the area "Stark's Folly".

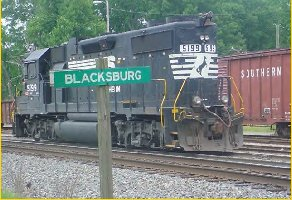
The railroad played a major role in the history of Blacksburg.

In the late 19th century the Black family, headed by John G. Black, a Confederate veteran, was living in the area and persuaded the C.C. & C. Railroad Company to lay track through the town and build a depot. The town soon became known as "Black's Station" in honor of John G. Black and was incorporated as Black's Station town in 1876. The legal town was renamed "Blacksburg" in 1888.

Major John F. Jones of Massachusetts came to live in Blacksburg when hired as superintendent of the C. C. & C. Railroad. He donated his own money to build a school, hotel (the Cherokee Inn), and several other buildings in Blacksburg. He lived in Blacksburg until 1922, when he was appointed the South Carolina Internal Revenue Collector by the President of the United States.

In the 1890s large amounts of iron ore were found in the area, and many people hoping to make a fortune from mining it flocked to the town. Blacksburg became a boom town, and hotels and saloons were built for the new visitors. The town went by the name "Iron City" for a short time. Because of the "iron rush" the town became quite wealthy. It installed the first electric street lights in Upstate South Carolina and perhaps in the entire state. The town was renamed in 1888 as "Blacksburg" but still holds the nickname of "Iron City".

The Kings Mountain State Park Historic District was listed on the National Register of Historic Places in 2008.

== Geography ==
Blacksburg is located in northeastern Cherokee County 4 miles (6 km) south of the North Carolina border.

According to the United States Census Bureau, the town has a total area of 1.87 square miles (4.85 km^{2}), all land.

Whitaker Mountain is partially in the northern corner of the town, with a summit elevation outside the town limits of approximately 1,169 ft (356 m).

== Demographics ==
Historical population
Census	Pop.	Note	%±
1880	145		—
1890	1,245		758.6%
1900	1,285		3.2%
1910	1,110		−13.6%
1920	1,512		36.2%
1930	1,747		15.5%
1940	1,917		9.7%
1950	2,056		7.3%
1960	2,174		5.7%
1970	1,977		−9.1%
1980	1,873		−5.3%
1990	1,907		1.8%
2000	1,880		−1.4%
2010	1,848		−1.7%
2020	1,889		2.2%
U.S. Decennial Census

=== 2020 census ===
Blacksburg racial composition
Race	Num.	Perc.
White (non-Hispanic)	1,282	67.87%
Black or African American (non-Hispanic)	433	22.92%
Native American	7	0.37%
Asian	13	0.69%
Other/Mixed	103	5.45%
Hispanic or Latino	51	2.7%

As of the 2020 United States census, there were 1,889 people, 785 households, and 329 families residing in the town.

=== 2000 census ===
As of the census of 2000, there were 1,880 people, 785 households, and 503 families residing in the town. The population density was 1,018.8 inhabitants per square mile (393.4/km^{2}). There were 911 housing units at an average density of 493.7 per square mile (190.6/km^{2}). The racial makeup of the town was 74.52% White, 23.56% African American, 0.21% Native American, 0.11% Asian, 0.05% Pacific Islander, and 1.54% from two or more races. Hispanic or Latino of any race were 0.53% of the population.

There were 785 households, out of which 31.0% had children under the age of 18 living with them, 40.3% were married couples living together, 19.5% had a female householder with no husband present, and 35.8% were non-families. 32.6% of all households were made up of individuals, and 16.3% had someone living alone who was 65 years of age or older. The average household size was 2.39 and the average family size was 3.04.

In the town, the population was spread out, with 28.2% under the age of 18, 7.8% from 18 to 24, 27.9% from 25 to 44, 21.8% from 45 to 64, and 14.3% who were 65 years of age or older. The median age was 34 years. For every 100 females, there were 80.2 males. For every 100 females age 18 and over, there were 76.6 males.

The median income for a household in the town was $26,453, and the median income for a family was $35,208. Males had a median income of $27,384 versus $21,207 for females. The per capita income for the town was $16,833. About 13.7% of families and 17.4% of the population were below the poverty line, including 20.3% of those under age 18 and 29.4% of those age 65 or over.

=== Major transportation routes ===
- Interstate 85 runs northwest of the town, with access from Exits 100 and 102. There is a South Carolina Welcome Center at milemarker 103.
- US 29 is a two-lane highway that runs through the downtown area and serves as the main street (Cherokee Street). It leads southwest 8 miles (13 km) to downtown Gaffney and northeast 6 miles (10 km) to Grover, North Carolina.
- South Carolina Highway 5 is a four-lane road that passes east of the town center. SC 5 North ends at the south end of the bridge over I-85 at exit 102, 2 miles (3 km) north of the center of town. SC 5 South leads southeast 19 miles (31 km) to York and 34 miles (55 km) to Rock Hill.
- South Carolina Highway 198 is a four-lane road that begins at the north end of the bridge over I-85 at exit 102 and leads north 14 miles (23 km) to Shelby, North Carolina.

== Education ==
Public education in Blacksburg is administered by Cherokee County School District. The district operates Blacksburg Primary School, Blacksburg Elementary School, Blacksburg Middle School, and Blacksburg High School.

Blacksburg has a public library, a branch of the Cherokee County Library System.

== Media ==
The Cherokee Chronicle, a newspaper serving Cherokee County, is published Tuesdays and Thursdays.

The Gaffney Ledger, a newspaper of the city of Gaffney located 10 mi (16 km) southwest of Blacksburg, is published Monday, Wednesday, and Friday.

== Arts and culture ==
The Iron City Festival was held for the first time in 2006. The festival commemorates the founding of the town and is sponsored by the Blacksburg Business Association, Inc. Iron City Festival is held the third weekend in April.

The anniversary of the Battle of Kings Mountain is held annually on October 7–8 at the Kings Mountain National Military Park and honors those who fell at the Battle of Kings Mountain during the Revolutionary War.

Kings Mountain National Military Park and State Park, commemorating a battle of the Revolutionary War, are located about 8 miles (13 km) northeast of the town.

== Notable people ==
- Jason Gilfillan, professional baseball player, graduated from Blacksburg High School in 1994
- James Rhyne Killian, 10th president of MIT, from 1948 until 1959
- Mikki Moore, professional basketball player, graduated from Blacksburg High School in 1993
- Judy Rose, director of athletics at UNC Charlotte
