= Whitaker Mountain =

Mountain in Cherokee County, South Carolina

Highest point
- Elevation: 1,169 ft (356 m)
- Coordinates: 35.137074°N 81.502868°W

Geography
- Location: Cherokee County, South Carolina, U.S.
- Topo map: Whitaker Mountain Topo Map

Whitaker Mountain is a mountain summit in Cherokee County in the state of South Carolina (SC) and is one of the three mountain peaks in Cherokee County. Whitaker Mountain climbs to an elevation of around 1,169 feet (356 meters) above sea level. Whitaker Mountain is located within the town of Blacksburg, South Carolina.
