= Cherokee Falls, South Carolina =

Unincorporated community in South Carolina, US

Coordinates: 35°03′52″N 81°32′37″W

Cherokee Falls is a Census-designated place in Cherokee County, South Carolina, United States. It is 5 miles (8 km) south of the town of Blacksburg. A former mill community along the Broad River, Cherokee Falls was a town until disincorporation in the 1990s. The former Cherokee Falls Cotton Mill is now a major fireworks distribution center for Herbie's Famous Fireworks.

The community was named after the Cherokee people.

== Demographics ==
Historical population
Census	Pop.	Note	%±
2020	113		—
U.S. Decennial Census

Cherokee Falls first appeared as a census designated place in the 2020 U.S. census.

Cherokee Falls CDP, South Carolina – Racial and ethnic composition Note: the US Census treats Hispanic/Latino as an ethnic category. This table excludes Latinos from the racial categories and assigns them to a separate category. Hispanics/Latinos may be of any race.
Race / Ethnicity (NH = Non-Hispanic)	Pop 2020	2020
White alone (NH)	99	87.61%
Black or African American alone (NH)	0	0.00%
Native American or Alaska Native alone (NH)	0	0.00%
Asian alone (NH)	0	0.00%
Native Hawaiian or Pacific Islander alone (NH)	1	0.88%
Other race alone (NH)	1	0.88%
Mixed race or Multiracial (NH)	10	8.85%
Hispanic or Latino (any race)	2	1.77%
Total	113	100.00%
