= Ezell, Virginia =

Unincorporated community in Virginia, United States

Coordinates: 36°41′40″N 77°51′20″W

Ezell is an unincorporated community located in Brunswick County, in the U.S. state of Virginia.
