= Ezel (given name) =

Ezel is a given name. Notable people with the name include:

- Ezel Akay, Turkish film actor, director and producer
- Ezel Balık (born 2009), Turkish volleyball player
- Ezel Bayraktar, fictional character protagonist of the Turkish TV series Ezel
- Ezel Kural Shaw, Turkish American writer, wife of historian Stanford J. Shaw
