= Cashion Crossroads, South Carolina =

Unincorporated community in South Carolina, US

Coordinates: 35°05′23″N 81°30′28″W

Cashion Crossroads is a small unincorporated community located in the northern part of Cherokee County, South Carolina, United States.

The community was named for the Cashion family, who mainly settled in the area at first. The community used to have a two-room school house, which no longer stands. Today, there is a small convenience store located at the crossroads. Also, west of the community is Hopewell Baptist Church.
