= Thicketty, South Carolina =

Coordinates: 35°00′59″N 81°43′29″W

- Unincorporated community
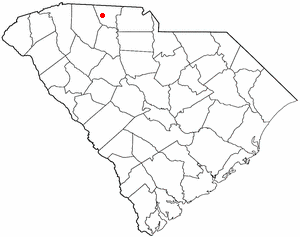
- Location of Thicketty, South Carolina
- Country: United States
- State: South Carolina
- County: Cherokee

Thicketty (also spelled Thickety) is an unincorporated community in Cherokee County, South Carolina, United States. It lies between Gaffney and Cowpens along U.S. Route 29. Thicketty is located approximately 12 miles (19 km) northeast of Spartanburg.

== History ==
A post office called Thickety was established in 1837. The community took its name from nearby Thicketty Mountain.
