= Thicketty Mountain =

Mountain in South Carolina, United States

Highest point
- Elevation: 1,194 ft (364 m)
- Coordinates: 35.112903°N 81.768435°W

Geography
- Location: Cherokee County, South Carolina, U.S.
- Topo map: Thicketty Mountain Topo Map

Thicketty Mountain is a mountain summit in northwestern Cherokee County in the state of South Carolina. Thicketty Mountain climbs to an elevation of around 1,194 feet (364 meters). Thicketty Mountain is also one of the three mountain peaks of Cherokee County.
