= Ezell, South Carolina =

Coordinates: 35°08′16″N 81°49′00″W

Ezell is a ghost town in Cherokee County, in the U.S. state of South Carolina.

== History ==
A post office called Ezell was established in 1880, remained in operation until 1906.

The community was named for J. H. Ezell, a local merchant.
