= Limestone University =

Christian university in Gaffney, South Carolina, US (1845–2025)

- Former names: Limestone Springs Female High School (1845–1881); Cooper-Limestone Institute (1881–1898); Limestone College (1898–2020)
- Motto: Toward The Light
- Type: Private university
- Active: 1845–May 30, 2025
- Accreditation: SACS-COC
- Religious affiliation: Non-denominational Christian
- Endowment: $8.37 Million (2024)
- Students: 1,786
- Location: Gaffney, South Carolina, United States; 35°03′21″N 81°38′59″W
- Campus: Suburban
- Colors: Blue and Gold
- Nickname: Saints
- Mascot: Saint Bernard (dog)
- Website: limestone.edu
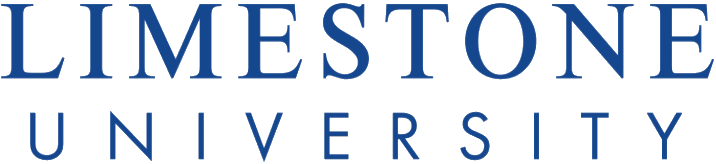

Limestone University, formerly Limestone College, was a private Christian university in Gaffney, South Carolina, United States. Established in 1845 by Thomas Curtis, a scholar born and educated in England, Limestone was the first women's college in South Carolina and one of the first in the nation. It was the third-oldest private college in South Carolina. Ten buildings on the campus, as well as the Limestone Springs and limestone quarry itself, are on the National Register of Historic Places. In addition to its traditional campus in Gaffney, the university provided online degrees and previously had physical locations in Charleston, Columbia, Greenville, and Florence.

In 1970, Limestone became fully coeducational. In 2020, its name was changed from Limestone College to Limestone University.

In 2025, the Limestone University Board voted to permanently terminate both on-campus and online operations at the end of the spring semester, citing significant financial challenges. The final graduation ceremony for Limestone University was held on May 3, 2025. Limestone Faculty issued a vote of "no confidence" against president Nathan B. Copeland prior to the ceremony and requested that the president and the board of trustees not be in attendance for the final ceremony.

== Academics ==
Over 80% of the faculty at Limestone held the terminal degree in their field, and the student/faculty ratio was 14:1. Limestone offered students 57 majors in four different divisions of study: Arts and Letters, Natural Sciences, Social and Behavioral Sciences, and Professional Studies. In addition to free, reasonable accommodations through the Accessibility Office, Limestone University offered a comprehensive support program, LEAP (Learning Enrichment & Achievement Program), for Day Campus students with learning and attention challenges.

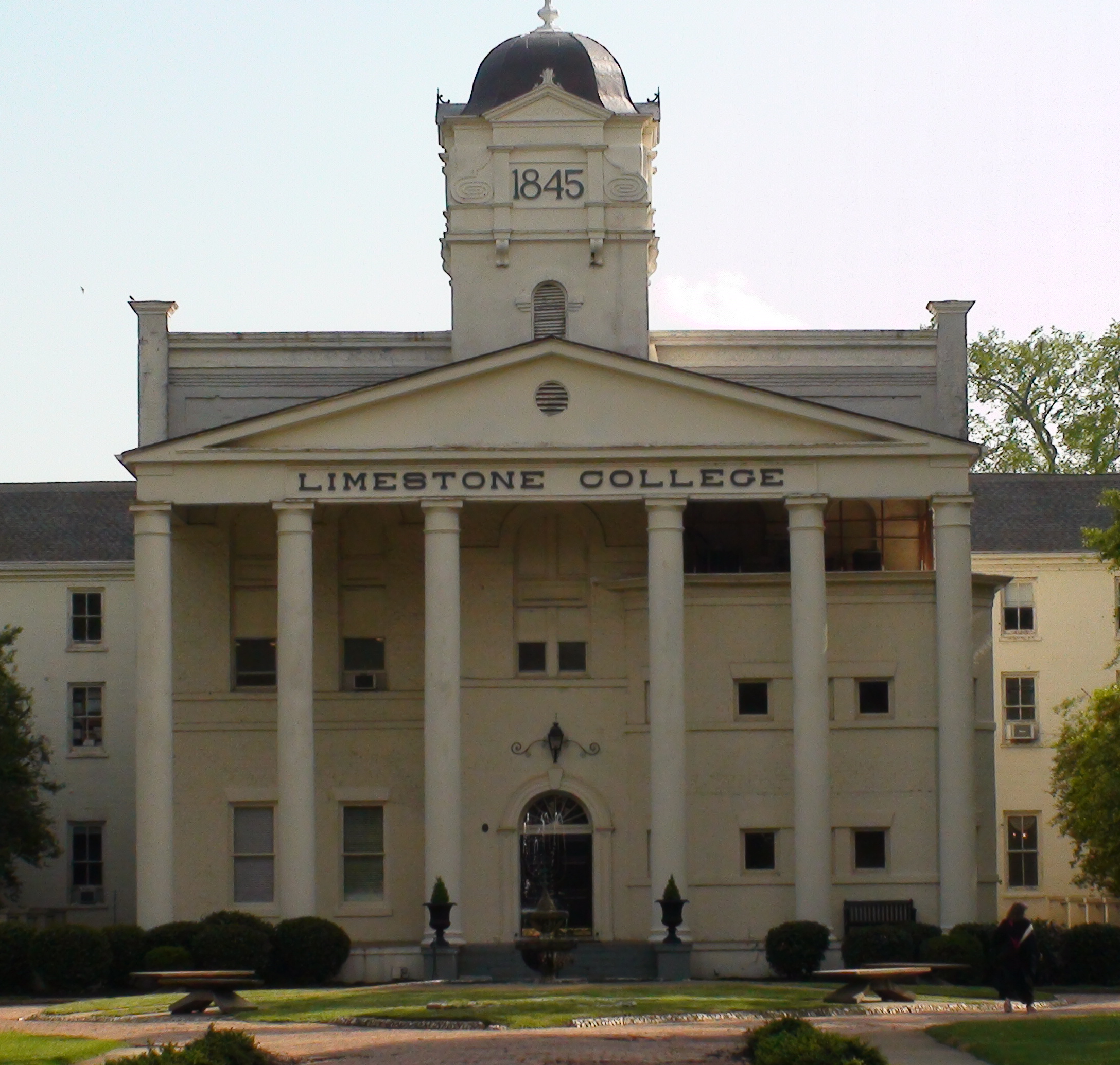

The 58,000 sq ft (5,400 m^{2}) Hines-Riggins Center was completed in 2021 and housed the campus library, campus store, student center, art gallery, meeting and study rooms, and dining options. It served as the academic and social hub of the campus.

Limestone offered an online Master of Business Administration, as well as an MBA concentration in Healthcare Administration. A Master of Social Work degree was also available online, along with an RN-to-BSN Nursing Program.

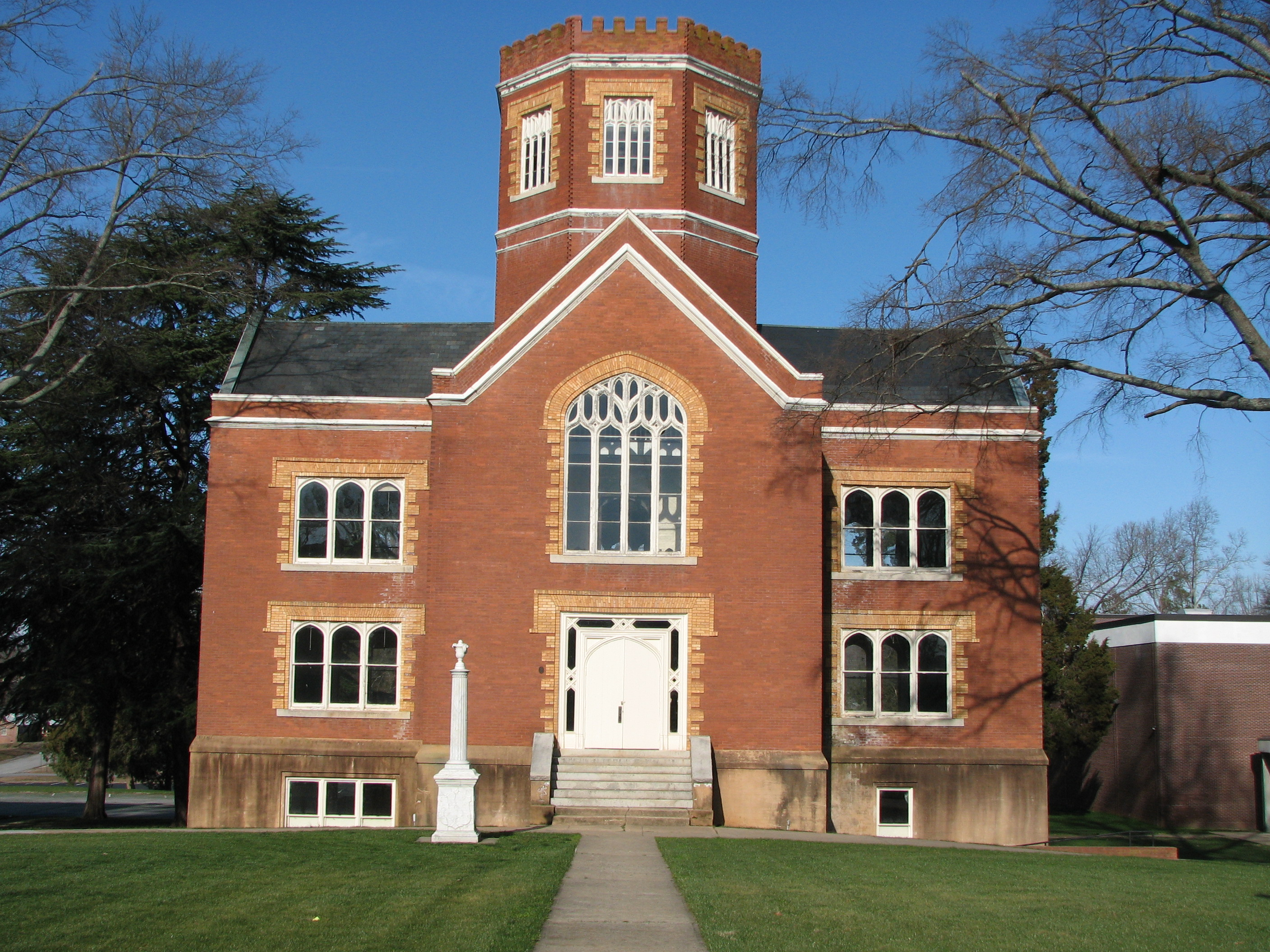
Winnie Davis Hall

In April 2025, the university's board of trustees decided that the university would close at the end of the spring semester due to ongoing financial challenges. A final fundraising effort was made prior to the decision which raised $2.143 million, but that was not sufficient. Afterwards, the school owed students almost $400,000 in tuition refunds, but the refunds were slow to materialize.

== Athletics ==
Limestone played sports in the South Atlantic Conference (SAC). Limestone offered competitive opportunities at the NCAA Division II level for men in football, soccer, basketball, baseball, wrestling, lacrosse, golf, cross country, tennis, and track and field and for women in golf, volleyball, basketball, softball, tennis, soccer, cross country, lacrosse, cheerleading, track and field, acrobatics/tumbling, and field hockey. Limestone had an indoor Olympic-size pool for intramural and recreational use, along with a Physical Education facility containing classrooms, offices, locker rooms, Athletic Training Education facilities for the school's fully accredited Athletic Training program, a fitness center, and a wrestling practice facility.

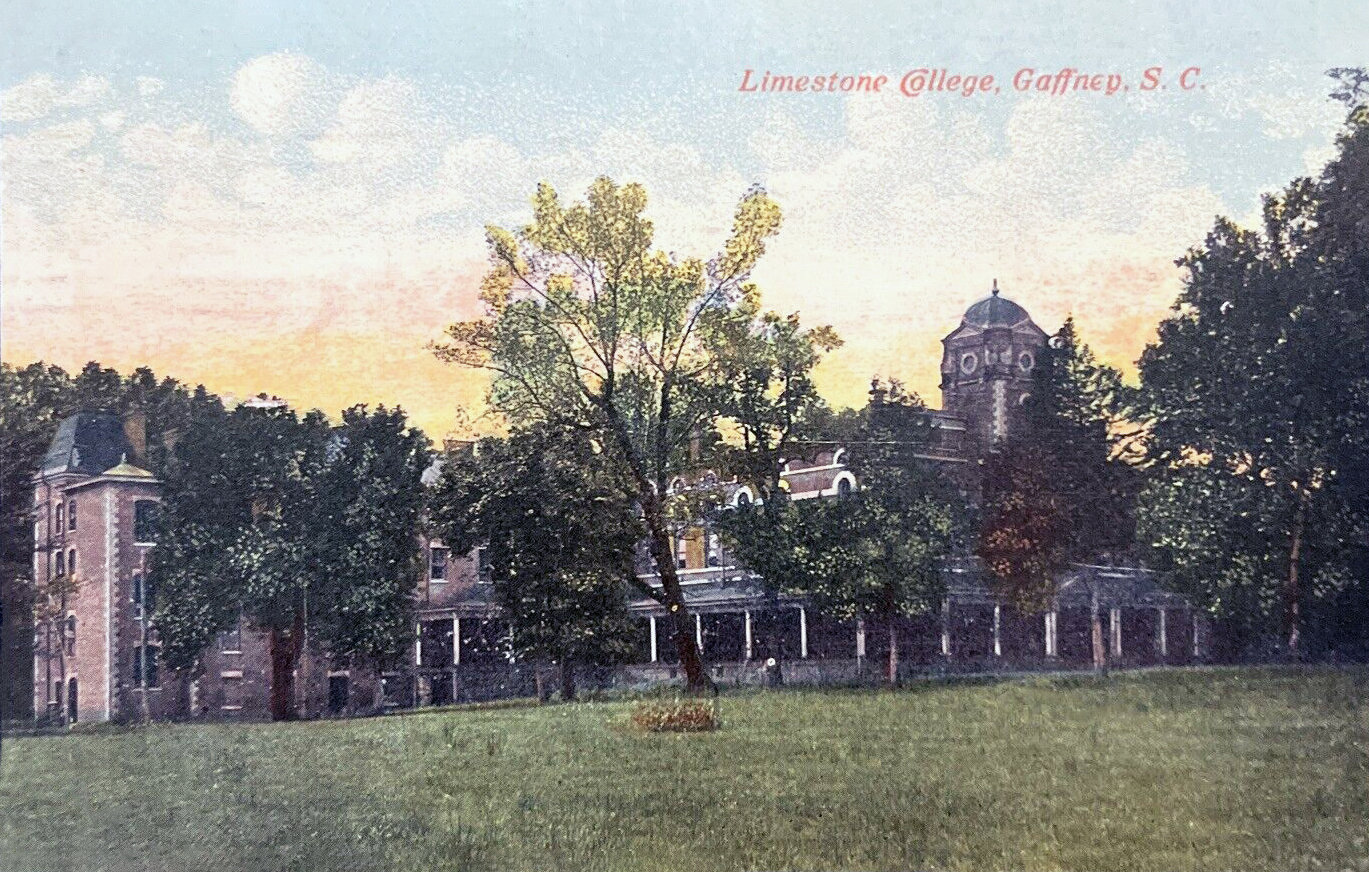
Postcard of the college

== Clubs and organizations ==
Clubs and organizations at the university included academics, religious, leadership, musical, theatre, and special interest affiliations. Students also contributed to a yearbook and a literary magazine of poems, essays, short stories, and art.

The college had a Reserve Officers' Training Corps program in conjunction with Wofford College for students interested in serving in the military or reserves.

== Notable alumni ==
- Jay Byars, '09, reality TV show contestant, Survivor: One World
- Lois Collier, actress
- Alphonza Gadsden, bishop of the Reformed Episcopal Church
- Mark Mathabane, South African author
- Ann Gordon McCrory, former First Lady of North Carolina
- Bob Peeler, '74, former Lieutenant Governor of South Carolina
- Gaylord Perry, Hall of Fame Major League Baseball player, was the LC baseball program's first coach
- Kevin Pucetas, '06, minor league baseball player
- Eleanor P. Sheppard, first female mayor of Richmond, Virginia
- Vyncint Smith, football wide receiver in the NFL and CFL

== See also ==
- Limestone Springs Historic District
- National Register of Historic Places listings in Cherokee County, South Carolina
