= Kings Mountain National Military Park =

National Military Park and protected area

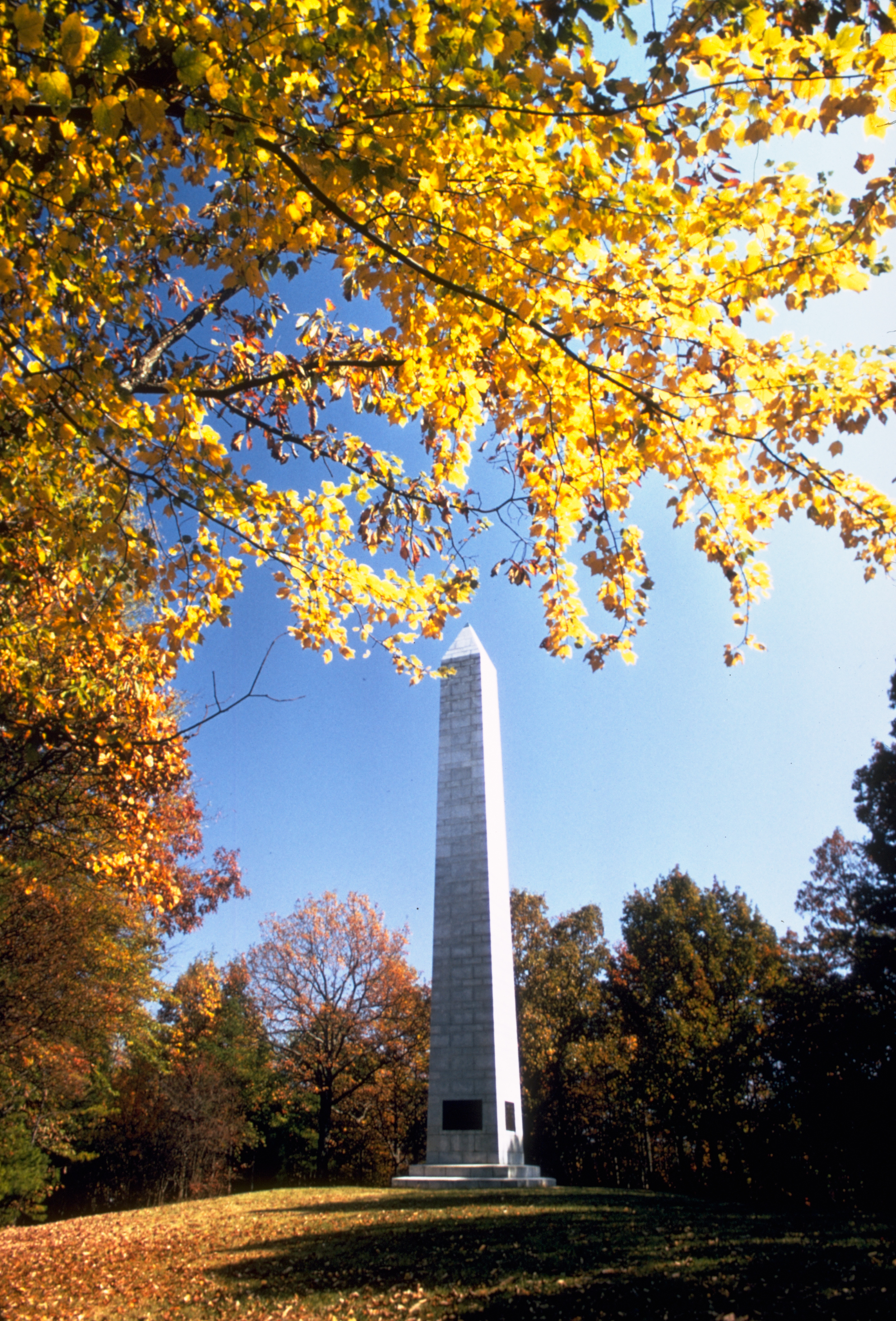
- Kings Mountain Monument

- Location within South Carolina Location within the United States
- Location: York / Cherokee counties, South Carolina
- Nearest city: Blacksburg, South Carolina
- Coordinates: 35°8′16″N 81°23′22″W
- Area: 3,945 acres (1,596 ha)
- Established: August 10, 1933
- Visitors: 175,511 (in 2025)
- Governing body: National Park Service
- Website: Kings Mountain National Military Park
- Kings Mountain Monument
- U.S. National Register of Historic Places
- U.S. Historic district
- Built: 1780
- Architect: Mckim, Mead & White; Howser, Henry (NPS)
- Architectural style: Modern Movement, Late 19th And 20th Century Revivals, Federal
- NRHP reference No.: 66000079
- Added to NRHP: October 15, 1966

Kings Mountain National Military Park is a National Military Park near Blacksburg, South Carolina, along the North Carolina/South Carolina border. The park commemorates the Battle of Kings Mountain, a pivotal and significant victory by American Patriots over American Loyalists during the Southern Campaign of the Revolutionary War. It was listed on the National Register of Historic Places in 1996. Thomas Jefferson considered the battle "The turn of the tide of success."

== Historical background ==
The Battle of Kings Mountain was fought on October 7, 1780, and destroyed the left wing of Lord Cornwallis' army, effectively ending Loyalist ascendance in the Carolinas. The victory halted the British advance into North Carolina, forced Lord Cornwallis to retreat from Charlotte into South Carolina, and gave General Nathanael Greene the opportunity to reorganize the American Army.

== Battle of Kings Mountain ==
Prior to 1780, much of the Revolutionary War was fought in the Northern states. After an unsuccessful Northern campaign, British General Clinton decided to turn his attention to the south, where he believed that he and his troops would join up with loyalist militias and easily take the area. The campaign began with a swift move to capture Charleston, which was taken over after two months of fighting. After the capture of Charleston, Clinton wanted to capitalize on his victory, and sent British detachments in all directions, to subdue as much resistance as possible. After placing Cornwallis in charge of the Southern Campaign, Clinton returned to New York, where much of the British high command was. Clinton's instructions were to first finish off South Carolina, and then move north, to North Carolina, followed by Virginia.

After the defeat at Charleston, Colonel Abraham Buford, whose force of 400 Virginians had been too late to help defend Charleston, decided to take his troops and head back to Virginia. In late May, his troops were intercepted by Colonel Tarleton's troops. When the two forces met, the Battle of Waxhaws ensued. Realizing his force could not win, Buford sent forward a messenger to surrender, however, Buford's requests were ignored. Tarleton wanted to make an example of Buford's troops, and killed 113 of his men, and wounded around 50 so badly that they could not be moved. Another 50 were taken prisoner, and the remaining 200 managed to escape. The Battle of Waxhaws helped inspire armed resistance in much of the south, especially in the Carolinas.

The situation in the southern states was getting desperate. Many people considered giving up Georgia and the Carolinas without a fight. There were few organized forces left in the south. Theodore Roosevelt's quote, from his book Winning of the West, sums up the situation quite well: "Except for occasional small guerrilla parties, there was not a single organized body of American troops left south of Gates....". Despite the derelict feelings of many southerners, enough patriotism was stirred to gather a small contingent of men to defend the Kings Mountain area. Despite reported ankle-deep snow during their march, the men continued to train and march on. After stopping for a lunch break at the Roan Highlands, it was discovered that two men with tory leanings were missing. Deciding that the British may be closer than originally thought, the commanding officers decided to change their route. The men traveled on a couple more days, until stopping at Gillespie's Gap to divide their troops in case of a British ambush. After dividing their troops, the now-separated forces marched on, until they met again on September 30. Later, men from Wilkes County and Surry County, North Carolina joined the so-called Overmountain Men on their march towards the British, bringing their total force to about 1,400. The army resumed marching on October 1, however, they stopped due to heavy rains, which continued on in to the next day. After roughly an hour of combat the Patriot forces defeated the British, and took nearly 700 prisoners.

== Establishment ==
Kings Mountain National Military Park was established on March 3, 1931 by an act of Congress: "in order to commemorate the Battle of Kings Mountain." The park is the terminus of the Overmountain Victory National Historic Trail commemorating the route of the Patriot army from over the Appalachian Mountains to the battle.

The park adjoins Kings Mountain State Park, which offers camping, picnicking and a "living history" farm. It is approximately 30 miles south of Charlotte, North Carolina and approximately 60 miles North of Greenville, South Carolina. Kings Mountain can be seen from I-85 North for many miles.

=== Historic trail ===
A one and a half mile paved trail leads from the visitor center around the base of the mountain along the Patriot lines and ascends to the crest where the Loyalists were positioned. The trail passes several monuments, large and small, the earliest dating from 1815, as well as Patrick Ferguson's grave, giving a good sense of the battleground. The trail is moderately steep in places. As part of the NPS's Centennial Initiative, the trail will be rehabilitated to eliminate the steeper sections of the trail, making it accessible to everyone.

On the sesquicentennial of the battle, then-president Herbert Hoover gave a speech commemorating the battle and the monument as "a place of inspiring memories." In the speech, he chronicled the basic history of America, detailing many great things about America, such as the rise of the American man and women. The whole speech can be read here. A year after Hoover gave his speech, a monument was erected by the Daughters of the American Revolution, which simply states "ON THIS SITE / PRESIDENT HOOVER / ADDRESSED AN AUDIENCE OF 75,000 / AT THE CELEBRATION OF THE / SESQUI CENTENNIAL / OF THE BATTLE OF KINGS MOUNTAIN," finishing with the date of the address. The monument, placed roughly where Hoover was standing, is a stop along the historic loop trail.

== Mountain peaks ==
- Brown's Mountain - Cherokee County
- Joes Mountain - York County

== See also ==
- Kings Mountain, North Carolina
