= South Carolina's 4th congressional district =

U.S. House district for South Carolina

Coordinates: 34.93°N 82.19°W

- Interactive map of district boundaries since January 3, 2023
- Representative: William Timmons; R–Greenville
- Population (2025): 809,594
- Median household income: $71,643
- Ethnicity: 64.1% White; 18.3% Black; 10.6% Hispanic; 3.7% Two or more races; 2.6% Asian; 0.7% other
- Cook PVI: R+11

South Carolina's 4th congressional district is a congressional district in upstate South Carolina bordering North Carolina. It includes parts of Greenville and Spartanburg counties. The district includes the two major cities of Greenville and Spartanburg.

The district is one of the most conservative in the state. In the late 20th century, it has been in Republican hands since 1979, aside from a six-year stint by Democrat Liz J. Patterson, the daughter of former Senator Olin Johnston. Even before the Republicans finally took control of the seat, the 4th had been a rather conservative district. Like in most of the state, the old-line Southern Democrats began splitting their tickets as early as the 1940s. However, this area's white conservatives became increasingly willing to support Republicans at the state and local level as early as the 1970s, well before the rest of the state swung Republican. The district is a major destination for presidential candidates in election years, as South Carolina is one of the first states to hold a presidential primary.

Republican William Timmons has represented the district since January 3, 2019. He succeeded Republican Trey Gowdy who did not seek reelection.

From 2003 to 2013, the district included all of Spartanburg and Union counties and parts of Greenville and Laurens counties.

Greenville and parts of Spartanburg counties are entirely within the district.

== Recent election results from statewide races ==
Year	Office	Results
2008	President	McCain 60% - 38%
2012	President	Romney 62% - 38%
2016	President	Trump 59% - 35%
2016	Senate	Scott 66% - 31%
2018	Governor	McMaster 58% - 42%
2018	Secretary of State	Hammond 62% - 38%
2018	Treasurer	Loftis 61% - 36%
2018	Attorney General	Wilson 60% - 38%
2020	President	Trump 58% - 40%
2020	Senate	Graham 58% - 41%
2022	Senate	Scott 67% - 33%
2022	Governor	McMaster 61% - 37%
2022	Secretary of State	Hammond 67% - 33%
2024	President	Trump 61% - 37%
2026	Senate	Andrews 49% - 47%
2026	Governor	Wilson 53% - 45%

== Composition ==
For the 118th and successive Congresses (based on redistricting following the 2020 census), the district contains all or portions of the following counties and communities:

Greenville County (21)
Berea, Caesars Head, The Cliffs Valley, Conestee, Duncan, Five Forks, Gantt, Golden Grove (part; also 3rd), Greenville, Greer (shared with Spartanburg County), Judson, Mauldin, Parker, Sans Souci, Simpsonville, Slater-Marietta, Taylors, Tigerville, Travelers Rest, Wade Hampton, Welcome
Spartanburg County (34)
Arcadia, Arkwright, Ben Avon, Boiling Springs (part; also 5th), Camp Croft, Campobello, Central Pacolet, Clifton, Converse (part; also 5th), Cross Anchor, Drayton, Duncan, Enoree, Fairforest, Glenn Springs, Gramling, Greer (shared with Greenville County), Hilltop, Inman, Inman Mills, Landrum, Lyman, Pacolet, Pauline, Reidville, Roebuck, Saxon, Southern Shops, Spartanburg, Startex, Valley Falls, Wellford, Whitney, Woodruff

== List of members representing the district ==
Member (Residence)	Party	Years	Cong ress	Electoral history	District location
District established March 4, 1789
Thomas Sumter (Stateburg)	Anti-Administration	March 4, 1789 – March 3, 1793	1st 2nd	Elected in 1788. Re-elected in 1790. Retired.	1789–1793 "Camden district" South Carolina congressional districts, 1789–1793 1st district, Charleston 2nd district, Beaufort-Orangeburg 3rd district, Georgetown-Cheraw 4th district, Camden 5th district, Ninety-Six
Richard Winn (Winnsboro)	Anti-Administration	March 4, 1793 – March 3, 1795	3rd 4th	Elected in 1793. Re-elected in 1794. Lost re-election.	1793–1797 "Camden district"
Richard Winn (Winnsboro)	Democratic-Republican	March 4, 1795 – March 3, 1797	3rd 4th	Elected in 1793. Re-elected in 1794. Lost re-election.	1793–1797 "Camden district"
Thomas Sumter (Stateburg)	Democratic-Republican	March 4, 1797 – December 15, 1801	5th 6th 7th	Elected in 1796. Re-elected in 1798. Re-elected in 1800. Resigned when elected U.S. senator.	1797–1803 "Camden district" 1796 election results by district
Vacant		December 15, 1801 – January 24, 1803	7th		1797–1803 "Camden district" 1796 election results by district
Richard Winn (Winnsboro)	Democratic-Republican	January 24, 1803 – March 3, 1803	7th	Elected to finish Sumter's term. Redistricted to the 5th district.	1797–1803 "Camden district" 1796 election results by district
Wade Hampton (Columbia)	Democratic-Republican	March 4, 1803 – March 3, 1805	8th	Elected in 1803. Retired.	1803–1813 "Orangeburgh district"
O'Brien Smith (Jacksonboro)	Democratic-Republican	March 4, 1805 – March 3, 1807	9th	Elected in 1804. Retired.	1803–1813 "Orangeburgh district"
John Taylor (Columbia)	Democratic-Republican	March 4, 1807 – December 30, 1810	10th 11th	Elected in 1806. Re-elected in 1808. Lost re-election and resigned.	1803–1813 "Orangeburgh district"
Vacant		December 30, 1810 – March 3, 1811	11th		1803–1813 "Orangeburgh district"
William Lowndes (Jacksonboro)	Democratic-Republican	March 4, 1811 – March 3, 1813	12th	Elected in 1810. Redistricted to the 2nd district.	1803–1813 "Orangeburgh district"
John J. Chappell (Columbia)	Democratic-Republican	March 4, 1813 – March 3, 1817	13th 14th	Elected in 1812. Re-elected in 1814. Lost re-election.	1813–1823 "Orangeburgh district"
Joseph Bellinger (Barnwell)	Democratic-Republican	March 4, 1817 – March 3, 1819	15th	Elected in 1816. Retired.	1813–1823 "Orangeburgh district"
James Overstreet (Kings Creek)	Democratic-Republican	March 4, 1819 – May 24, 1822	16th 17th	Elected in 1818. Re-elected in 1820. Died.	1813–1823 "Orangeburgh district"
Vacant		May 24, 1822 – December 4, 1822	17th		1813–1823 "Orangeburgh district"
Andrew R. Govan (Orangeburg)	Democratic-Republican (Note: Supported the Jackson faction in the 1824 United States presidential election.)	December 4, 1822 – March 3, 1825	17th 18th 19th	Elected to finish Overstreet's term. Re-elected in 1823. Re-elected in 1824. Lost re-election.	1813–1823 "Orangeburgh district"
Andrew R. Govan (Orangeburg)	Democratic-Republican	December 4, 1822 – March 3, 1825	17th 18th 19th	Elected to finish Overstreet's term. Re-elected in 1823. Re-elected in 1824. Lost re-election.	1823–1833 "Orangeburgh district": Barnwell, Lexington, Orangeburgh, and Richland counties
Andrew R. Govan (Orangeburg)	Jacksonian	March 4, 1825 – March 3, 1827	17th 18th 19th	Elected to finish Overstreet's term. Re-elected in 1823. Re-elected in 1824. Lost re-election.	1823–1833 "Orangeburgh district": Barnwell, Lexington, Orangeburgh, and Richland counties
William D. Martin (Barnwell)	Jacksonian	March 4, 1827 – March 3, 1831	20th 21st	Elected in 1826. Re-elected in 1828. Retired.	1823–1833 "Orangeburgh district": Barnwell, Lexington, Orangeburgh, and Richland counties
John M. Felder (Orangeburg)	Jacksonian	March 4, 1831 – March 3, 1833	22nd 23rd	Elected in 1830. Re-elected in 1833. Retired.	1823–1833 "Orangeburgh district": Barnwell, Lexington, Orangeburgh, and Richland counties
John M. Felder (Orangeburg)	Nullifier	March 4, 1833 – March 3, 1835	22nd 23rd	Elected in 1830. Re-elected in 1833. Retired.	1833–1843 [data missing]
James H. Hammond (Newberry)	Nullifier	March 4, 1835 – February 26, 1836	24th	Elected in 1834. Resigned.	1833–1843 [data missing]
Vacant		February 26, 1836 – December 10, 1836	24th		1833–1843 [data missing]
Franklin H. Elmore (Columbia)	Nullifier	December 10, 1836 – March 3, 1839	24th 25th	Elected October 10, 1836 to finish Hammond's term and seated December 19, 1836. Elected the same day in 1836 to the next term. Retired.	1833–1843 [data missing]
Sampson H. Butler (Barnwell)	Democratic	March 4, 1839 – September 27, 1842	26th 27th	Elected in 1838. Re-elected in 1840. Resigned.	1833–1843 [data missing]
Vacant		September 27, 1842 – December 17, 1842	27th		1833–1843 [data missing]
Samuel W. Trotti (Barnwell)	Democratic	December 17, 1842 – March 3, 1843	27th	Elected to finish Butler's term. Retired.	1833–1843 [data missing]
John Campbell (Parnassus)	Democratic	March 4, 1843 – March 3, 1845	28th	Redistricted from the 3rd district and re-elected in 1843. Retired.	1843–1853 [data missing]
Alexander D. Sims (Darlington)	Democratic	March 4, 1845 – November 22, 1848	29th 30th	Elected in 1844. Re-elected in 1846. Re-elected in 1848 but died before next term began.	1843–1853 [data missing]
Vacant		November 22, 1848 – February 12, 1849	30th		1843–1853 [data missing]
John McQueen (Bennettsville)	Democratic	February 12, 1849 – March 3, 1853	30th 31st 32nd	Elected to finish Sims's term in the 30th Congress. Elected to finish Sims's term win the 31st Congress. Re-elected in 1850. Redistricted to the 1st district.	1843–1853 [data missing]
Preston S. Brooks (Ninety Six)	Democratic	March 4, 1853 – July 15, 1856	33rd 34th	Elected in 1853. Re-elected in 1854. Resigned to gain constituents' support following the caning of Charles Sumner.	1853–1863 [data missing]
Vacant		July 15, 1856 – August 1, 1856	34th		1853–1863 [data missing]
Preston S. Brooks (Ninety Six)	Democratic	August 1, 1856 – January 28, 1857	34th	Re-elected to finish his vacant term. Re-elected in 1856 but died before next term began.	1853–1863 [data missing]
Vacant		January 28, 1857 – May 5, 1857	34th		1853–1863 [data missing]
Milledge L. Bonham (Edgefield)	Democratic	May 5, 1857 – December 21, 1860	35th 36th	Elected to finish Brooks' term. Re-elected in 1858. Re-elected in 1860 but retired due to Civil War.	1853–1863 [data missing]
District inactive		December 21, 1860 – July 18, 1868	36th 37th 38th 39th 40th	Civil War and Reconstruction	
James H. Goss (Union)	Republican	July 18, 1868 – March 3, 1869	40th	Elected in 1868. Retired.	1868–1873 [data missing]
Vacant		March 4, 1869 – May 27, 1870	41st	William D. Simpson (D) elected, but not seated.	1868–1873 [data missing]
Alexander S. Wallace (Yorkville)	Republican	May 27, 1870 – March 3, 1877	41st 42nd 43rd 44th	Successfully contested election of William D. Simpson. Re-elected in 1870. Re-elected in 1872. Re-elected in 1874. Lost re-election.	1868–1873 [data missing]
Alexander S. Wallace (Yorkville)	Republican	May 27, 1870 – March 3, 1877	41st 42nd 43rd 44th	Successfully contested election of William D. Simpson. Re-elected in 1870. Re-elected in 1872. Re-elected in 1874. Lost re-election.	1873–1883 [data missing]
John H. Evins (Spartanburg)	Democratic	March 4, 1877 – October 20, 1884	45th 46th 47th 48th	Elected in 1876. Re-elected in 1878. Re-elected in 1880. Re-elected in 1882. Died.	1873–1883 [data missing]
John H. Evins (Spartanburg)	Democratic	March 4, 1877 – October 20, 1884	45th 46th 47th 48th	Elected in 1876. Re-elected in 1878. Re-elected in 1880. Re-elected in 1882. Died.	1883–1893 [data missing]
Vacant		October 20, 1884 – December 8, 1884	48th		1883–1893 [data missing]
John Bratton (White Oak)	Democratic	December 8, 1884 – March 3, 1885	48th	Elected to finish Evins's term. Retired.	1883–1893 [data missing]
William H. Perry (Greenville)	Democratic	March 4, 1885 – March 3, 1891	49th 50th 51st	Elected in 1884. Elected in 1886. Re-elected in 1888. Retired.	1883–1893 [data missing]
George W. Shell (Laurens)	Democratic	March 4, 1891 – March 3, 1895	52nd 53rd	Elected in 1890. Re-elected in 1892. Retired.	1883–1893 [data missing]
George W. Shell (Laurens)	Democratic	March 4, 1891 – March 3, 1895	52nd 53rd	Elected in 1890. Re-elected in 1892. Retired.	1893–1903 [data missing]
Stanyarne Wilson (Spartanburg)	Democratic	March 4, 1895 – March 3, 1901	54th 55th 56th	Elected in 1894. Re-elected in 1896. Re-elected in 1898. Retired.	1893–1903 [data missing]
Joseph T. Johnson (Spartanburg)	Democratic	March 4, 1901 – April 19, 1915	57th 58th 59th 60th 61st 62nd 63rd 64th	Elected in 1900. Re-elected in 1902. Re-elected in 1904. Re-elected in 1906. Re-elected in 1908. Re-elected in 1910. Re-elected in 1912. Re-elected in 1914. Resigned to accept a federal judgeship.	1893–1903 [data missing]
Joseph T. Johnson (Spartanburg)	Democratic	March 4, 1901 – April 19, 1915	57th 58th 59th 60th 61st 62nd 63rd 64th	Elected in 1900. Re-elected in 1902. Re-elected in 1904. Re-elected in 1906. Re-elected in 1908. Re-elected in 1910. Re-elected in 1912. Re-elected in 1914. Resigned to accept a federal judgeship.	1903–1933 [data missing]
Vacant		April 19, 1915 – September 14, 1915	64th		1903–1933 [data missing]
Samuel J. Nicholls (Spartanburg)	Democratic	September 14, 1915 – March 3, 1921	64th 65th 66th	Elected to finish Johnson's term. Re-elected in 1916. Re-elected in 1918. Retired.	1903–1933 [data missing]
John J. McSwain (Greenville)	Democratic	March 4, 1921 – August 6, 1936	67th 68th 69th 70th 71st 72nd 73rd 74th	Elected in 1920. Re-elected in 1922. Re-elected in 1924. Re-elected in 1926. Re-elected in 1928. Re-elected in 1930. Re-elected in 1932. Re-elected in 1934. Died.	1903–1933 [data missing]
John J. McSwain (Greenville)	Democratic	March 4, 1921 – August 6, 1936	67th 68th 69th 70th 71st 72nd 73rd 74th	Elected in 1920. Re-elected in 1922. Re-elected in 1924. Re-elected in 1926. Re-elected in 1928. Re-elected in 1930. Re-elected in 1932. Re-elected in 1934. Died.	1933–1943 [data missing]
Vacant		August 6, 1936 – November 3, 1936	74th		1933–1943 [data missing]
Gabriel H. Mahon Jr. (Greenville)	Democratic	November 3, 1936 – January 3, 1939	74th 75th	Elected to finish McSwain's term. Also elected to the next full term. Lost renomination.	1933–1943 [data missing]
Joseph R. Bryson (Greenville)	Democratic	January 3, 1939 – March 10, 1953	76th 77th 78th 79th 80th 81st 82nd 83rd	Elected in 1938. Re-elected in 1940. Re-elected in 1942. Re-elected in 1944. Re-elected in 1946. Re-elected in 1948. Re-elected in 1950. Re-elected in 1952. Died.	1933–1943 [data missing]
Joseph R. Bryson (Greenville)	Democratic	January 3, 1939 – March 10, 1953	76th 77th 78th 79th 80th 81st 82nd 83rd	Elected in 1938. Re-elected in 1940. Re-elected in 1942. Re-elected in 1944. Re-elected in 1946. Re-elected in 1948. Re-elected in 1950. Re-elected in 1952. Died.	1943–1953 [data missing]
Joseph R. Bryson (Greenville)	Democratic	January 3, 1939 – March 10, 1953	76th 77th 78th 79th 80th 81st 82nd 83rd	Elected in 1938. Re-elected in 1940. Re-elected in 1942. Re-elected in 1944. Re-elected in 1946. Re-elected in 1948. Re-elected in 1950. Re-elected in 1952. Died.	1953–1963 [data missing]
Vacant		March 10, 1953 – June 2, 1953	83rd		1953–1963 [data missing]
Robert T. Ashmore (Greenville)	Democratic	June 2, 1953 – January 3, 1969	83rd 84th 85th 86th 87th 88th 89th 90th	Elected to finish Bryson's term. Re-elected in 1954. Re-elected in 1956. Re-elected in 1958. Re-elected in 1960. Re-elected in 1962. Re-elected in 1964. Re-elected in 1966. Retired.	1953–1963 [data missing]
Robert T. Ashmore (Greenville)	Democratic	June 2, 1953 – January 3, 1969	83rd 84th 85th 86th 87th 88th 89th 90th	Elected to finish Bryson's term. Re-elected in 1954. Re-elected in 1956. Re-elected in 1958. Re-elected in 1960. Re-elected in 1962. Re-elected in 1964. Re-elected in 1966. Retired.	1963–1973 [data missing]
James R. Mann (Greenville)	Democratic	January 3, 1969 – January 3, 1979	91st 92nd 93rd 94th 95th	Elected in 1968. Re-elected in 1970. Re-elected in 1972. Re-elected in 1974. Re-elected in 1976. Retired.	1963–1973 [data missing]
James R. Mann (Greenville)	Democratic	January 3, 1969 – January 3, 1979	91st 92nd 93rd 94th 95th	Elected in 1968. Re-elected in 1970. Re-elected in 1972. Re-elected in 1974. Re-elected in 1976. Retired.	1973–1983 [data missing]
Carroll A. Campbell Jr. (Greenville)	Republican	January 3, 1979 – January 3, 1987	96th 97th 98th 99th	Elected in 1978. Re-elected in 1980. Re-elected in 1982. Re-elected in 1984. Retired to run for governor of South Carolina	1973–1983 [data missing]
Carroll A. Campbell Jr. (Greenville)	Republican	January 3, 1979 – January 3, 1987	96th 97th 98th 99th	Elected in 1978. Re-elected in 1980. Re-elected in 1982. Re-elected in 1984. Retired to run for governor of South Carolina	1983–1993 [data missing]
Liz J. Patterson (Spartanburg)	Democratic	January 3, 1987 – January 3, 1993	100th 101st 102nd	Elected in 1986. Re-elected in 1988. Re-elected in 1990. Lost re-election.	1983–1993 [data missing]
Bob Inglis (Greenville)	Republican	January 3, 1993 – January 3, 1999	103rd 104th 105th	Elected in 1992. Re-elected in 1994. Re-elected in 1996. Retired to run for U.S. senator.	1993–2003 [data missing]
Jim DeMint (Greenville)	Republican	January 3, 1999 – January 3, 2005	106th 107th 108th	Elected in 1998. Re-elected in 2000. Re-elected in 2002. Retired to run for U.S. senator.	1993–2003 [data missing]
Jim DeMint (Greenville)	Republican	January 3, 1999 – January 3, 2005	106th 107th 108th	Elected in 1998. Re-elected in 2000. Re-elected in 2002. Retired to run for U.S. senator.	2003–2013
Bob Inglis (Travelers Rest)	Republican	January 3, 2005 – January 3, 2011	109th 110th 111th	Elected in 2004. Re-elected in 2006. Re-elected in 2008. Lost renomination.	2003–2013
Trey Gowdy (Spartanburg)	Republican	January 3, 2011 – January 3, 2019	112th 113th 114th 115th	Elected in 2010. Re-elected in 2012. Re-elected in 2014. Re-elected in 2016. Retired.	2003–2013
Trey Gowdy (Spartanburg)	Republican	January 3, 2011 – January 3, 2019	112th 113th 114th 115th	Elected in 2010. Re-elected in 2012. Re-elected in 2014. Re-elected in 2016. Retired.	2013–2023
William Timmons (Greenville)	Republican	January 3, 2019 – present	116th 117th 118th 119th	Elected in 2018. Re-elected in 2020. Re-elected in 2022. Re-elected in 2024. Re-elected in 2026.	2013–2023
William Timmons (Greenville)	Republican	January 3, 2019 – present	116th 117th 118th 119th	Elected in 2018. Re-elected in 2020. Re-elected in 2022. Re-elected in 2024. Re-elected in 2026.	2023–2033

== Past election results ==
=== 2012 ===
2012 South Carolina's 4th congressional district election
Party	Candidate	Votes	%
Republican	Trey Gowdy (incumbent)	173,201	64.9
Democratic	Deb Morrow	89,964	33.7
Green	Jeff Sumerel	3,390	1.3
Write-in		329	0.1
Total votes		266,884	100.0
Republican hold			

=== 2014 ===
2014 South Carolina's 4th congressional district election
Party	Candidate	Votes	%
Republican	Trey Gowdy (incumbent)	126,452	84.8
Libertarian	Curtis E. McLaughlin, Jr.	21,969	14.8
Write-in		628	0.4
Total votes		149,049	100.0
Republican hold			

=== 2016 ===
2016 South Carolina's 4th congressional district election
Party	Candidate	Votes	%
Republican	Trey Gowdy (incumbent)	198,648	67.2
Democratic	Chris Fedalei	91,676	31.0
Constitution	Michael Chandler	5,103	1.7
Write-in		243	0.1
Total votes		295,670	100.0
Republican hold			

=== 2018 ===
2018 South Carolina's 4th congressional district election
Party	Candidate	Votes	%
Republican	William Timmons	145,321	59.6
Democratic	Brandon Brown	89,182	36.6
American	Guy Furay	9,203	3.8
Write-in		244	0.1
Total votes		243,950	100.0
Republican hold			

=== 2020 ===
2020 South Carolina's 4th congressional district election
Party	Candidate	Votes	%
Republican	William Timmons (incumbent)	222,126	61.6
Democratic	Kim Nelson	133,023	36.9
Constitution	Michael Chandler	5,090	1.4
Write-in		311	0.1
Total votes		360,550	100.0
Republican hold			

=== 2022 ===
2022 South Carolina's 4th congressional district election
Party	Candidate	Votes	%
Republican	William Timmons (incumbent)	165,607	90.81
Write-in		16,758	9.19
Total votes		182,365	100%
Republican hold			

=== 2024 ===
2024 South Carolina's 4th congressional district election
Party	Candidate	Votes	%
Republican	William Timmons (incumbent)	206,916	59.7
Democratic	Kathryn Harvey	128,976	37.2
Constitution	Mark Hackett	9,779	2.8
Write-in		743	0.2
Total votes		346,414	100.0
Republican hold			

== See also ==
- List of United States congressional districts
- South Carolina's congressional districts
