= Spartanburg County School District 7 =

School district in South Carolina, United States

Spartanburg County School District Seven
- The current logo of Spartanburg County School District 7.

Location
- 610 Dupre Drive; Spartanburg, South Carolina 29307 United States
- Coordinates: 34°57′08″N 81°53′48″W

District information
- Motto: To inspire and equip
- Grades: Pre-K–12
- Established: 1884; 142 years ago
- Superintendent: Jeff Stevens
- Business administrator: Melissa Campbell (Chief Financial Officer)
- School board: 9 members, elected to 4-year terms
- Chair of the board: Sharon Porter
- Director of education: Terry O. Pruitt (Chief Academic Officer)
- Schools: 11, alongside 7 alternative institutions
- Budget: $84,985,000.00 (2022-23 General Fund)
- NCES District ID: 4503660

Students and staff
- Students: 7,118 (2021-22)
- Teachers: 670.45 (FTE)
- Staff: 725.30 (FTE)
- Student–teacher ratio: 14.92

Other information
- See Also: Spartanburg County School District 1; Spartanburg County School District 2; Spartanburg County School District 3; Spartanburg County School District 4; Spartanburg County School District 5; Spartanburg County School District 6; Spartanburg County School District 7
- Website: www.spartanburg7.org

Spartanburg County School District 7 (SCSD7) is a public school district in Spartanburg County, South Carolina, United States. The district includes most of the city of Spartanburg, as well as all of Ben Avon, Drayton and Whitney, most of Camp Croft, and portions of Arkwright, Hilltop, and Saxon. SCSD7 is led by Superintendent Jeff Stevens, a former principal at Spartanburg High School; he assumed the role of superintendent in July 2020.

As of the 2021–22 academic term, Spartanburg County School District 7 serves more than 7,000 students across 11 schools. SCSD7 also hosts several alternative institutions, as well two early college programs and a virtual learning initiative.

Spartanburg County School District 7 was established in 1884. It is a small, urban, majority-minority district. About 80% of students served by the district live in poverty. 86% of students educated in SCSD7 graduate, and an annual average of 84% of students go on to pursue a post-secondary education.

== Schools ==
=== High school ===
- Spartanburg High School

=== Middle schools ===
- Carver Middle School
- McCracken Middle School

=== Elementary schools ===
- Cleveland Academy of Leadership
- Drayton Mills Elementary School (formed from Chapman Elementary and Houston Elementary)
- E.P. Todd School
- Jesse Boyd Elementary School
- Mary H. Wright Elementary School
- McCarthy-Teszler School
- Pine Street Elementary School

=== Other institutions ===
- Daniel Morgan Technology Center (shared with Spartanburg County School District 3)
- District 7 Early Learning Center at Park Hills
- The Franklin School
- McCarthy Teszler School
- Meeting Street Academy
- Spartanburg County Adult Education
- Whitlock Flexible Learning Center

=== Former schools ===
- Chapman Elementary School (merged into Drayton Mills Elementary)
- Houston Elementary School (merged into Drayton Mills Elementary)

== See also ==
- Spartanburg County School District 1
- Spartanburg County School District 2
- Spartanburg County School District 3
- Spartanburg County School District 4
- Spartanburg County School District 5
- Spartanburg County School District 6
