= Gramling, South Carolina =

Gramling
- CDP
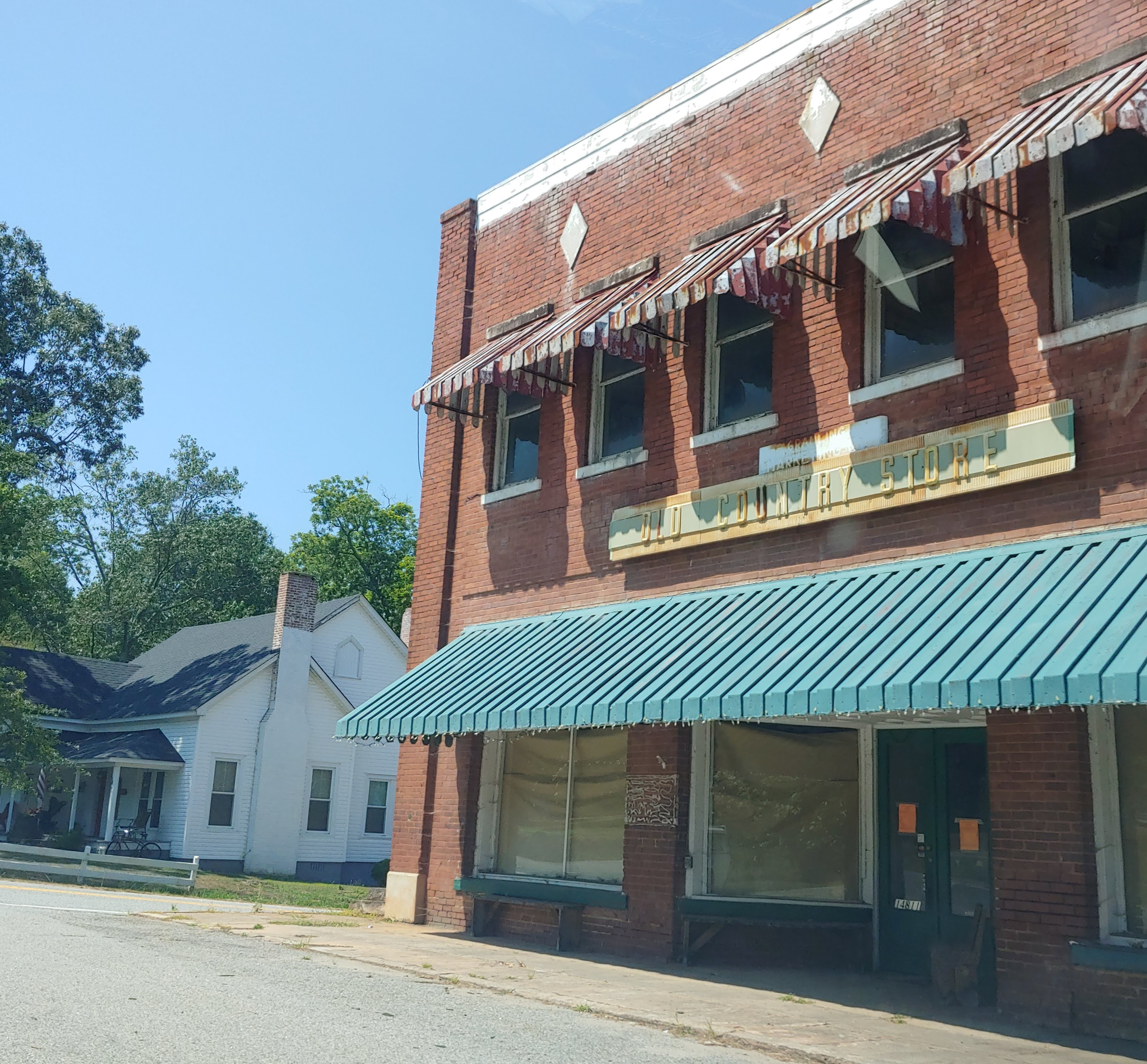
- Old Country Store on U.S. Route 176 in Gramling, SC

- Location within the state of South Carolina
- Coordinates: 35°04′44″N 82°07′43″W
- Country: United States
- State: South Carolina
- County: Spartanburg

Area
  - Total: 1.01 sq mi (2.62 km^{2})
  - Land: 1.00 sq mi (2.60 km^{2})
  - Water: 0.0077 sq mi (0.02 km^{2})
- Elevation: 981 ft (299 m)

Population (2020)
  - Total: 81
  - Density: 80.7/sq mi (31.15/km^{2})
- Time zone: UTC-5 (Eastern (EST))
  - Summer (DST): UTC-4 (EDT)
- ZIP codes: 29349
- FIPS code: 45083
- GNIS feature ID: 2629829

Gramling is a census-designated place located in Spartanburg County in the U.S. state of South Carolina. According to the 2010 United States census, the population was 86.

== History ==
Gramling was founded in the 1890s. A post office has been in operation at Gramling since 1892.

== Geography ==
Gramling is located in the Northwestern part of the county, between the Town of Campobello and the City of Inman.

According to the United States Census Bureau, the CDP has a total land area of 1.004 square miles (3.599 km^{2}) and a total water area of 0.009 square miles (0.023 km^{2}).

== Demographics ==
Historical population
Census	Pop.	Note	%±
2020	81		—
U.S. Decennial Census

== Education ==
It is in the Spartanburg School District 1.
