= Whitney, South Carolina =

- Census-designated place
- Location within South Carolina Location within the United States
- Coordinates: 34°59′01″N 81°55′34″W
- Country: United States
- State: South Carolina
- County: Spartanburg

Area
  - Total: 3.07 sq mi (7.94 km^{2})
  - Land: 3.05 sq mi (7.90 km^{2})
  - Water: 0.015 sq mi (0.04 km^{2})
- Elevation: 768 ft (234 m)

Population (2020)
  - Total: 4,409
  - Density: 1,445.1/sq mi (557.97/km^{2})
- Time zone: UTC-5 (Eastern (EST))
  - Summer (DST): UTC-4 (EDT)
- ZIP Code: 29303 (Spartanburg)
- Area codes: 864, 821
- FIPS code: 45-77425
- GNIS feature ID: 2807094

Whitney is an unincorporated area and census-designated place (CDP) adjacent to the city of Spartanburg in Spartanburg County, South Carolina, United States. It was first listed as a CDP prior to the 2020 census with a population of 4,409.

== Geography ==
The CDP is in central Spartanburg County and is bordered to the southwest by the city of Spartanburg. It is bordered to the west by South Carolina Highway 9, to the northwest by Interstate 85 Business, and the southeast by the Blue Ridge Subdivision railroad line of CSX Transportation. Besides Spartanburg, neighboring communities are Drayton to the southeast, Hilltop to the west, and Valley Falls to the northwest.

U.S. Route 221 (Chesnee Highway) is the main road through Whitney. It leads southwest into Spartanburg and north 32 miles (51 km) to Rutherfordton, North Carolina. Lawsons Fork Creek runs through Whitney, flowing southeast toward the Pacolet River, a tributary of the Broad River.

== Demographics ==
Historical population
Census	Pop.	Note	%±
2020	4,409		—
U.S. Decennial Census; 2020

Whitney first appeared as a census designated place in the 2020 U.S. census.

=== Racial and ethnic composition ===
Whitney CDP, South Carolina – Racial and ethnic composition Note: the US Census treats Hispanic/Latino as an ethnic category. This table excludes Latinos from the racial categories and assigns them to a separate category. Hispanics/Latinos may be of any race.
Race / Ethnicity (NH = Non-Hispanic)	Pop 2020	2020
White alone (NH)	2,037	46.20%
Black or African American alone (NH)	1,392	31.57%
Native American or Alaska Native alone (NH)	9	0.20%
Asian alone (NH)	124	2.81%
Native Hawaiian or Pacific Islander alone (NH)	1	0.02%
Other race alone (NH)	17	0.39%
Mixed race or Multiracial (NH)	147	3.33%
Hispanic or Latino (any race)	682	15.47%
Total	4,409	100.00%

=== 2020 census ===
As of the 2020 census, Whitney had a population of 4,409. The median age was 36.4 years. 23.7% of residents were under the age of 18 and 14.7% of residents were 65 years of age or older. For every 100 females there were 90.1 males, and for every 100 females age 18 and over there were 86.4 males age 18 and over.

100.0% of residents lived in urban areas, while 0.0% lived in rural areas.

There were 1,726 households in Whitney, of which 31.1% had children under the age of 18 living in them. Of all households, 32.2% were married-couple households, 21.9% were households with a male householder and no spouse or partner present, and 37.1% were households with a female householder and no spouse or partner present. About 29.7% of all households were made up of individuals and 10.5% had someone living alone who was 65 years of age or older.

There were 1,904 housing units, of which 9.3% were vacant. The homeowner vacancy rate was 1.9% and the rental vacancy rate was 6.3%.
