= Broome High School =

Public high school in Spartanburg County, South Carolina

- Gettys D. Broome High School logo

Location
- 381 Cherry Hill Rd, Spartanburg, South Carolina, 2930, United States; Spartanburg County, South Carolina 29307
- Coordinates: 34°59′10″N 81°50′32″W

Information
- School type: Public, secondary
- Motto: Conquer and Prevail!
- Established: 1975
- Status: Open
- School district: Spartanburg County School District 3
- Principal: Josh Fowler
- Teaching staff: 48
- Grades: 9–12
- Gender: Co-educational
- Enrollment: 888 (2023-2024)
- Student to teacher ratio: 19:1
- Schedule type: Block
- Campus type: Mid-size suburb
- Colors: Royal blue, white, and gold
- Mascot: Centurion
- Rival: Chesnee High School
- Website: spartanburg3.org/o/gdbhs

Gettys D. Broome High School is a public high school in Spartanburg, South Carolina, United States.

A part of Spartanburg County School District 3, it was constructed in 1975 after the consolidation of multiple other high schools in the surrounding area. It has a student population of approximately 900. The principal is Rodney Graves. The school shares the vocational center Daniel Morgan Technology Center with Spartanburg High School.

== History ==
Broome High School was founded in 1975 as a result of the consolidation between Cowpens High School and Pacolet High School. The two former schools submitted ideas for a new mascot. After a lengthy process, the Centurions was eventually chosen to be the new mascot. The school was opened the following year in 1976.

== Programs ==
=== Academics ===
==== School performance ====
As of 2022, Broome High School's graduation rate was 81.9%, above the state average of 83.8%. The dropout rate was 3.0%, a 1.5% increase from the previous year.

=== Accolades ===
In 2023, Broome High School's football field was named "Field of the Year" by the South Carolina Sports Field Management Association.

=== Athletics ===
Broome High School offers the following seasonal athletics:

Fall

- Cheerleading
- Co-ed cross country
- Football
- Boys' golf
- Girls' golf
- Boys' tennis
- Girls' tennis
- Volleyball

Winter

- Boys' basketball
- Girls' basketball
- Boys' wrestling

Spring

- Boys' baseball
- Boys' soccer
- Girls' soccer
- Girls' softball
- Boys' tennis
- Girls' tennis
- Co-ed track

== See also ==
- List of high schools in South Carolina
