= Spartanburg County, South Carolina =

County in South Carolina, United States

- County
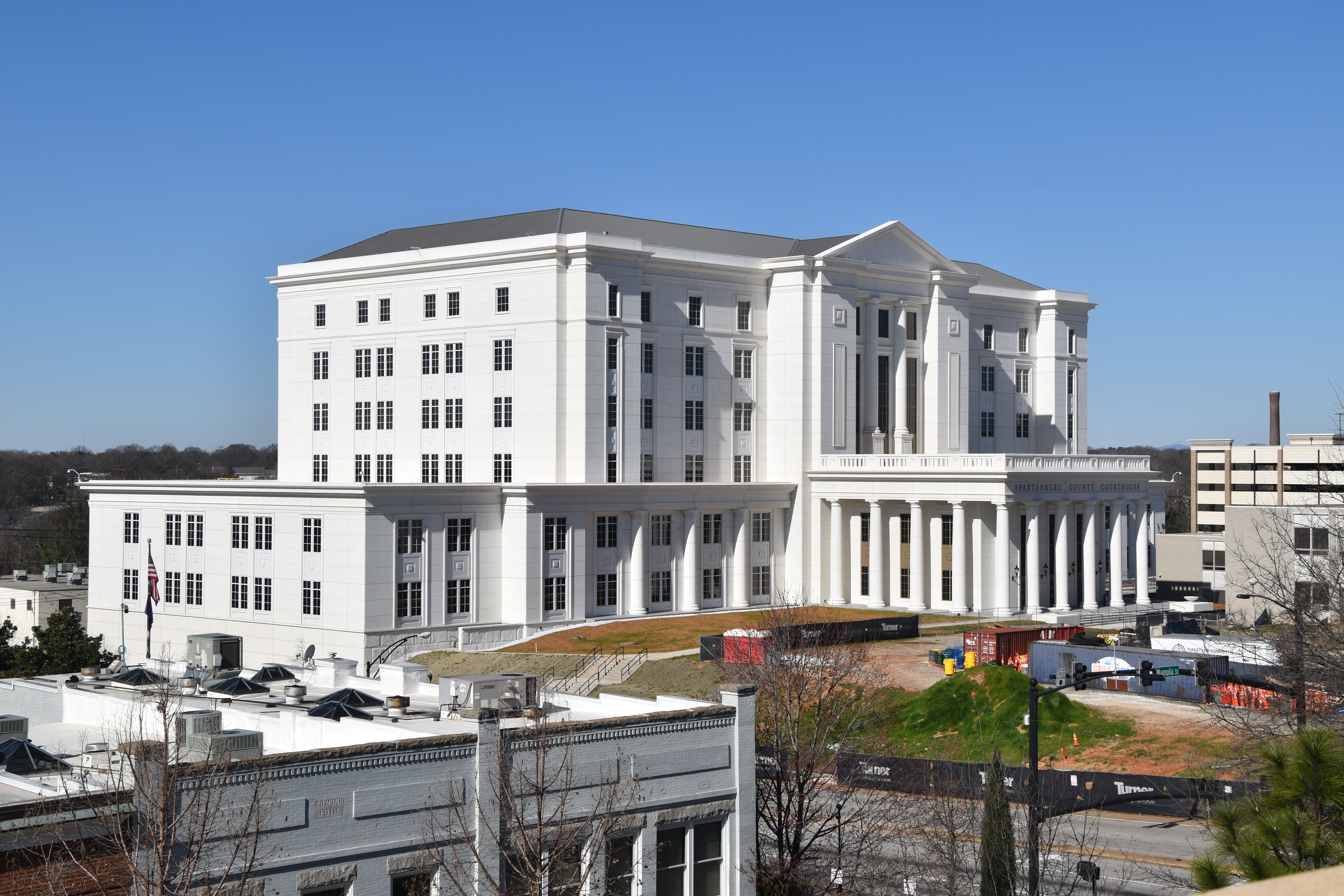
- Spartanburg County Courthouse

- Seal

- Location within the U.S. state of South Carolina
- Coordinates: 34.93°N 81.99°W
- Country: United States
- State: South Carolina
- Founded: 1791
- Named for: Spartan Regiment
- Seat: Spartanburg
- Largest community: Spartanburg

Area
  - Total: 819.74 sq mi (2,123.1 km^{2})
  - Land: 808.34 sq mi (2,093.6 km^{2})
  - Water: 11.40 sq mi (29.5 km^{2}) 1.39%

Population (2020)
  - Total: 327,997
  - Estimate (2025): 380,857 ▲
  - Density: 405.77/sq mi (156.67/km^{2})
- Time zone: UTC−5 (Eastern)
  - Summer (DST): UTC−4 (EDT)
- Congressional districts: 4th, 5th
- Website: www.spartanburgcounty.gov

Spartanburg County is located on the northwestern border of the U.S. state of South Carolina. As of the 2020 census, the population was 327,997, making it the fifth-most populous county in South Carolina. Its county seat is Spartanburg. Spartanburg County is the largest county within the Spartanburg, SC Metropolitan Statistical Area, which is also included in the Greenville-Spartanburg-Anderson, SC Combined Statistical Area.

== History ==
The county was founded in 1785 and was named after the Spartan Rifles (Spartan Regiment) which was a local militia during the American Revolutionary War. The largest community and the county seat is Spartanburg, which resides in Upstate South Carolina.

The ship USS Spartanburg County is named after the county.

Spartanburg County was the center of the 2025-2026 South Carolina measles outbreak. By the end of January 2026, South Carolina exceeded any other state in terms of confirmed measles cases with over 990 cases mostly centered around Spartanburg County. The county was ground zero for the largest measles outbreak since 2000, the year that measles was declared eliminated in the United States. Spartanburg has been characterized by extensive vaccine skepticism and low vaccination rates; at one school, only 20 percent of students were vaccinated.

== Geography ==
Interactive map of Spartanburg County

According to the U.S. Census Bureau, the county has a total area of 819.74 square miles (2,123.1 km^{2}), of which 808.34 square miles (2,093.6 km^{2}) is land and 11.40 square miles (29.5 km^{2}) (1.39%) is water.

=== State and local protected areas/sites ===
- Arcadia Mill No. 1
- Arcadia Mill No. 2
- Battle of Musgrove Mill State Historic Site (part)
- Blackstock Plantation (part)
- Converse Heights Historic District
- Croft State Park
- Daniel Morgan Monument
- Emily Dickinson
- Glendale Ridge Archaeological Site
- Hampton Heights Historic District
- Hatcher Garden and Woodland Preserve
- Historic Price House
- Lake Cooley Park
- Nesbitt Shoals Nature Park
- Pacolet River Heritage Preserve
- Peter's Creek Heritage Preserve
- Santee Cooper Tract Wildlife Management Area
- Seay House
- Tyger River Park

=== Major water bodies ===
- Enoree River
- Lake Craig
- Lake William C. Bowan
- Lawsons Fork Creek
- North Pacolet River
- Pacolet River
- South Pacolet River
- South Tyger River
- Tyger Lake
- Tyger River

=== Adjacent counties ===
- Rutherford County, North Carolina – north
- Cherokee County – east
- Union County – southeast
- Laurens County – south
- Greenville County – west
- Polk County, North Carolina – northwest

=== Major highways ===
- I-26
- I-85
- I-85 BL
- I-585
- US 29
- US 176
- US 176 Conn. (Spartanburg 1)
- US 176 Conn. (Spartanburg 2)
- US 221
- US 221 Alt.
- SC 9
- SC 11
- SC 43
- SC 49
- SC 56
- SC 56 Conn.
- SC 80
- SC 92
- SC 92 Conn.
- SC 101
- SC 101 Truck
- SC 110
- SC 129
- SC 146
- SC 150
- SC 150 Truck
- SC 215
- SC 290
- SC 290 Truck
- SC 292
- SC 292 Conn.
- SC 295
- SC 296
- SC 357
- SC 358

=== Major infrastructure ===
- Greenville–Spartanburg International Airport
- Inland Port Greer, major rail depot in the county
- Spartanburg Downtown Airport
- Spartanburg Station

== Demographics ==
Historical population
Census	Pop.	Note	%±
1790	8,800		—
1800	12,122		37.8%
1810	14,259		17.6%
1820	16,989		19.1%
1830	21,150		24.5%
1840	23,669		11.9%
1850	26,400		11.5%
1860	26,919		2.0%
1870	25,784		−4.2%
1880	40,409		56.7%
1890	55,385		37.1%
1900	65,560		18.4%
1910	83,465		27.3%
1920	94,265		12.9%
1930	116,323		23.4%
1940	127,733		9.8%
1950	150,349		17.7%
1960	156,830		4.3%
1970	173,724		10.8%
1980	201,861		16.2%
1990	226,800		12.4%
2000	253,791		11.9%
2010	284,307		12.0%
2020	327,997		15.4%
2025 (est.)	380,857	▲	16.1%
U.S. Decennial Census; 1790–1960 1900–1990; 1990–2000 2010 2020

=== Racial and ethnic composition ===
Spartanburg County, South Carolina – Racial and ethnic composition Note: the US Census treats Hispanic/Latino as an ethnic category. This table excludes Latinos from the racial categories and assigns them to a separate category. Hispanics/Latinos may be of any race.
Race / Ethnicity (NH = Non-Hispanic)	Pop 1980	Pop 1990	Pop 2000	Pop 2010	Pop 2020	% 1980	% 1990	% 2000	% 2010	% 2020
White alone (NH)	159,020	176,556	187,752	199,184	214,440	78.78%	77.85%	73.98%	70.06%	65.38%
Black or African American alone (NH)	40,261	46,750	52,506	58,115	63,565	19.94%	20.61%	20.69%	20.44%	19.38%
Native American or Alaska Native alone (NH)	136	314	508	562	699	0.07%	0.14%	0.20%	0.20%	0.21%
Asian alone (NH)	540	1,633	3,694	5,680	8,176	0.27%	0.72%	1.46%	2.00%	2.49%
Native Hawaiian or Pacific Islander alone (NH)	x	x	60	69	190	x	x	0.02%	0.02%	0.06%
Other race alone (NH)	288	26	169	321	1,102	0.14%	0.01%	0.07%	0.11%	0.34%
Mixed race or Multiracial (NH)	x	x	2,021	3,718	12,093	x	x	0.80%	1.31%	3.69%
Hispanic or Latino (any race)	1,616	1,521	7,081	16,658	27,732	0.80%	0.67%	2.79%	5.86%	8.45%
Total	201,861	226,800	253,791	284,307	327,997	100.00%	100.00%	100.00%	100.00%	100.00%

=== 2020 census ===
As of the 2020 census, there were 327,997 people, 125,836 households, and 83,432 families residing in the county.

The median age was 38.8 years, with 23.2% of residents under the age of 18 and 16.9% aged 65 years or older; for every 100 females there were 94.2 males and for every 100 females age 18 and over there were 91.3 males.

The racial makeup of the county was 66.9% White, 19.6% Black or African American, 0.4% American Indian and Alaska Native, 2.5% Asian, 0.1% Native Hawaiian and Pacific Islander, 4.6% from some other race, and 6.0% from two or more races. Hispanic or Latino residents of any race comprised 8.5% of the population.

70.5% of residents lived in urban areas, while 29.5% lived in rural areas.

Of the 125,836 households, 31.9% had children under the age of 18 living with them and 28.5% had a female householder with no spouse or partner present. About 26.3% of all households were made up of individuals and 10.8% had someone living alone who was 65 years of age or older.

There were 137,009 housing units, of which 8.2% were vacant. Among occupied housing units, 70.6% were owner-occupied and 29.4% were renter-occupied. The homeowner vacancy rate was 1.6% and the rental vacancy rate was 9.3%.

=== 2010 census ===
At the 2010 census, there were 284,307 people, 109,246 households, and 75,404 families residing in the county. The population density was 351.9 inhabitants per square mile (135.9/km^{2}). There were 122,628 housing units at an average density of 151.8 per square mile (58.6/km^{2}). The racial makeup of the county was 72.3% white, 20.6% black or African American, 2.0% Asian, 0.3% American Indian, 3.1% from other races, and 1.7% from two or more races. Those of Hispanic or Latino origin made up 5.9% of the population. In terms of ancestry, 13.6% were American, 10.5% were Irish, 9.6% were English, and 8.8% were German.

Of the 109,246 households, 34.3% had children under the age of 18 living with them, 48.9% were married couples living together, 15.1% had a female householder with no husband present, 31.0% were non-families, and 26.2% of all households were made up of individuals. The average household size was 2.53 and the average family size was 3.05. The median age was 38.0 years.

The median income for a household in the county was $42,680 and the median income for a family was $53,149. Males had a median income of $41,445 versus $31,602 for females. The per capita income for the county was $21,924. About 11.0% of families and 14.8% of the population were below the poverty line, including 20.5% of those under age 18 and 10.9% of those age 65 or over.

Ukrainian Population

Spartanburg has a large Ukrainian American community. According to 2019 data, about 1,341 Spartanburg County residents were born in Ukraine.

== Government and politics ==
United States presidential election results for Spartanburg County, South Carolina
Year	Republican		Democratic		Third party(ies)	
Year	No.	%	No.	%	No.	%
1892	551	13.13%	3,515	83.79%	129	3.08%
1896	247	5.51%	4,234	94.49%	0	0.00%
1900	101	3.93%	2,467	96.07%	0	0.00%
1904	84	3.11%	2,621	96.89%	0	0.00%
1908	225	5.12%	4,162	94.76%	5	0.11%
1912	37	0.96%	3,616	94.07%	191	4.97%
1916	112	2.40%	4,503	96.32%	60	1.28%
1920	182	3.82%	4,584	96.18%	0	0.00%
1928	760	16.45%	3,859	83.53%	1	0.02%
1932	227	2.40%	9,216	97.59%	1	0.01%
1936	173	1.59%	10,739	98.41%	0	0.00%
1940	248	2.65%	9,119	97.35%	0	0.00%
1944	402	4.60%	8,092	92.61%	244	2.79%
1948	627	5.21%	6,741	55.98%	4,673	38.81%
1952	10,028	31.42%	21,883	68.58%	0	0.00%
1956	6,822	26.67%	16,637	65.03%	2,124	8.30%
1960	10,940	35.21%	20,134	64.79%	0	0.00%
1964	18,411	47.89%	20,034	52.11%	0	0.00%
1968	18,183	38.69%	11,467	24.40%	17,346	36.91%
1972	31,308	75.34%	9,586	23.07%	662	1.59%
1976	20,456	41.99%	27,925	57.32%	336	0.69%
1980	30,092	51.12%	27,245	46.28%	1,532	2.60%
1984	41,553	66.41%	20,130	32.17%	892	1.43%
1988	40,801	63.19%	22,964	35.57%	803	1.24%
1992	37,707	51.91%	25,488	35.09%	9,440	13.00%
1996	35,972	53.53%	26,814	39.90%	4,410	6.56%
2000	52,114	62.37%	29,559	35.38%	1,880	2.25%
2004	62,004	64.08%	33,633	34.76%	1,121	1.16%
2008	65,042	60.04%	41,632	38.43%	1,654	1.53%
2012	66,969	60.93%	41,461	37.72%	1,476	1.34%
2016	76,277	62.99%	39,997	33.03%	4,816	3.98%
2020	93,560	62.94%	52,926	35.60%	2,169	1.46%
2024	103,032	66.22%	50,710	32.59%	1,855	1.19%

Spartanburg County has long been a Republican stronghold, having not voted for a Democratic presidential nominee since 1976. No Democrat has won 40% of the county’s vote since 1980. In 2024, the county saw a strong rightward trend, with Donald Trump performing better than any Republican in the county since Ronald Reagan in 1984.

Spartanburg County County Council has seven members, six Republicans and one Democrat. A. Manning Lynch serves as the county council chairman, having been in that role since 2019. Meetings are usually in the middle of the month on the third week and take place at the Spartanburg County administration building in the county council chamber.

== Economy ==
In 2022, the GDP was $19.5 billion (about $54,626 per capita), and the real GDP was $16.7 billion (about $46,895 per capita) in chained 2017 dollars.

As of April 2024, some of the largest employers in the county include Adidas, BMW, Ingles, Michelin, Optum, QuikTrip, Sage Automotive Interiors, Siemens, and Walmart.

Employment and Wage Statistics by Industry in Spartanburg County, South Carolina - Q3 2023
Industry	Employment Counts	Employment Percentage (%)	Average Annual Wage ($)
Accommodation and Food Services	13,059	8.7	21,736
Administrative and Support and Waste Management and Remediation Services	7,800	5.2	40,300
Agriculture, Forestry, Fishing and Hunting	293	0.2	41,652
Arts, Entertainment, and Recreation	1,378	0.9	20,696
Construction	7,245	4.8	62,868
Educational Services	9,896	6.6	49,140
Finance and Insurance	2,842	1.9	73,996
Health Care and Social Assistance	22,105	14.7	65,104
Information	985	0.7	68,016
Management of Companies and Enterprises	1,843	1.2	99,060
Manufacturing	36,291	24.1	64,896
Mining, Quarrying, and Oil and Gas Extraction	103	0.1	66,092
Other Services (except Public Administration)	3,353	2.2	47,944
Professional, Scientific, and Technical Services	4,748	3.1	71,552
Public Administration	3,821	2.5	50,752
Real Estate and Rental and Leasing	1,752	1.2	53,456
Retail Trade	16,410	10.9	34,424
Transportation and Warehousing	9,011	6.0	53,872
Utilities	693	0.5	67,704
Wholesale Trade	7,163	4.8	64,428
Total	150,791	100.0%	54,303

== Education ==
=== Primary and secondary schools ===
There are eight school districts which cover portions of the county. Seven of them are within the Spartanburg County School System.

Some of the districts share a vocational school, and also share the McCarthy Teszler School, a special education school.

- School District One includes Campobello-Gramling, Chapman High School, Holly Springs-Motlow Elementary, Inman Elementary, Inman Intermediate, Landrum High, Landrum Middle, Mabry Middle, New Prospect Elementary, and O.P. Earle Elementary. District One students can also attend Swofford Career Center
- School District Two includes Boiling Springs Elementary, Cooley Springs-Fingerville Elementary, Chesnee Elementary, Hendrix Elementary, Carlisle-Foster's Grove Elementary, Mayo Elementary, Oakland Elementary, Boiling Springs Intermediate, Boling Springs Junior High, Rainbow Lake Middle School, Chesnee Middle School, Boiling Springs High 9th grade, Boiling Springs High School, and Chesnee High School. District Two students can also attend Swofford Career Center.
- School District Three includes Cannons Elementary, Clifdale Elementary, Cowpens Elementary School, Pacolet Elementary School, Cowpens Middle School, Middle School of Pacolet, and Broome High School. District Three students to the Daniel Morgan Technology Center.
- School District Four has four schools: Woodruff Primary, Woodruff Elementary, Woodruff Middle and Woodruff High School. High school students also can attend R.D. Anderson Applied Technology Center to learn vocational skills.
- School District Five consists of Abner Creek Academy (formerly Abner Creek Elementary), Duncan Elementary, Lyman Elementary, Reidville Elementary, River Ridge Elementary, Wellford Academy of Science and Technology (formerly Wellford Elementary), Beech Springs Intermediate, Berry Shoals Intermediate, D. R. Hill Middle, Florence Chapel Middle, James F. Byrnes Freshman Academy, and James F. Byrnes High School. Vocational school students can attend R. D. Anderson Applied Technology Center.
- School District Six comprises Anderson Mill Elementary, Arcadia Elementary, Jesse S. Bobo Elementary, Fairforest Elementary, Lone Oak Elementary, Pauline-Glenn Springs Elementary, Roebuck Elementary, West View Elementary, Woodland Heights Elementary, Fairforest Middle, R. P. Dawkins Middle, L. E. Gable Middle, Dorman Freshman Campus, and Paul M. Dorman High School. District Six students can attend R. D. Anderson Applied Technology Center.
- School District Seven consists of Jesse Boyd Elementary, Chapman Elementary, Cleveland Elementary, Houston Elementary, Park Hills Elementary, Pine Street Elementary, Mary H. Wright Elementary, Edwin P. Todd School, George Washington Carver Middle, Joseph G. McCracken Middle, Whitlock Junior High, Spartanburg High School Freshman Academy, and Spartanburg High School. The Daniel Morgan Technology Center, ZL Madden Learning Center, The Myles W. Whitlock Flexible Learning Center, and The Early Learning Center at Park Hills also serve District Seven.
- Greenville County School District covers small portions, including parts of Greer.

South Carolina School for the Deaf and the Blind is in an unincorporated area in the county, near Spartanburg.

Spartanburg Day School, a private school, is in an unincorporated area.

=== Colleges and universities ===
- Spartanburg Community College
- University of South Carolina Upstate in Valley Falls
- Spartanburg Methodist College in Saxon
- Converse University (Spartanburg)
- Wofford College (Spartanburg)
- Edward Via College of Osteopathic Medicine (Spartanburg)
- Sherman College of Chiropractic (Spartanburg)

== Healthcare ==
Spartanburg County's healthcare is mainly provided by Spartanburg Regional Healthcare System. Spartanburg Regional is a public, not-for-profit, integrated health care delivery system with several facilities in Spartanburg, including:

- Bearden-Josey Center for Breast Health, a state-of-the-art imaging center for digital mammography, ultrasound, stereotactic breast biopsy and bone densitometry.
- Gibbs Cancer Center & Research Institute, providing an inpatient oncology unit and outpatient care, along with access to clinical trials and the latest cancer technology. With locations across Upstate S.C., including Spartanburg and Greer in Spartanburg County.
- Medical Group of the Carolinas, a physician group with offices located throughout Spartanburg and Upstate South Carolina.
- Pelham Medical Center, in Greer, provides emergency services, general surgery, a medical office building and numerous practices.
- Regional HealthPlus (RHP), a network of hospitals and physicians of a wide range of specialty.
- Spartanburg Hospital for Restorative Care (SHRC), a 97-bed long-term, acute-care hospital with a 25-bed skilled nursing facility.
- Spartanburg Medical Center (SMC), a research and teaching hospital with two locations: Spartanburg Medical Center campus on East Wood Street and Spartanburg Medical Center — Mary Black Campus on Skylyn Drive. Together, these campuses share a history that stretches back to the 1920s. Spartanburg Medical Center includes a total of 747 beds, and services that include emergency, surgical, maternity, cancer, a Heart Center and inpatient rehabilitation.
- The Sports Medicine Institute, located at Upward Star Center, where doctors, athletic trainers, and physical therapists serve professional and recreational athletes.
- Woodruff Manor, an 88-bed skilled nursing and rehabilitation facility in Woodruff.

=== Cancer care expansion ===
In early 2018, Spartanburg Regional began construction on an expansion of its Gibbs Cancer Center & Research Institute at Pelham location. The 191,000-square-foot (17,700 m^{2}) expansion is intended to provide cancer care for more patients along the border of Spartanburg and Greenville counties. The expansion of the building was completed and began accepting patients in March 2020.

== Communities ==
=== Cities ===
- Chesnee (partly in Cherokee County)
- Greer (mostly in Greenville County)
- Inman
- Landrum
- Spartanburg (county seat and largest community)
- Wellford
- Woodruff

=== Towns ===
- Campobello
- Central Pacolet
- Cowpens
- Duncan
- Lyman
- Pacolet
- Reidville

=== Census-designated places ===
- Arcadia
- Arkwright
- Ben Avon
- Boiling Springs
- Camp Croft
- Clifton
- Converse
- Cross Anchor
- Drayton
- Enoree
- Fairforest
- Fingerville
- Glendale
- Glenn Springs
- Gramling
- Hilltop
- Inman Mills
- Mayo
- Pauline
- Roebuck
- Saxon
- Southern Shops
- Startex
- Valley Falls
- Whitney

=== Other unincorporated communities ===
- Campton
- Cashville
- Cherokee Springs
- Crescent
- Holly Springs
- Little Africa
- Little Chicago
- Moore
- New Prospect
- Pelham (also known as Sugar Tit)
- Stone Station
- Switzer
- Una
- White Stone

== Notable people ==
- Harold Cohen
- Ira Roe Foster
- Jacob Bridgeman
- Joe Bennett & the Sparkletones
- Marshall Tucker Band

== See also ==
- List of counties in South Carolina
- National Register of Historic Places listings in Spartanburg County, South Carolina
- Tryon County, North Carolina, former county in North Carolina which included modern-day parts of Spartanburg County
- Eastern Cherokee, Southern Iroquois, and United Tribes of South Carolina, state-recognized group that resides in the county
- Spartanburg County Foundation
