= List of Beta Alpha Psi chapters =

Beta Alpha Psi is an international accounting honor society. In the following list of chapters, active chapters and petitioning chapters are indicated in bold and inactive chapters are in italics.

#	Chapter	Charter date and range	Institution	Location	Status	Ref.
1	**Alpha**	February 12, 1919	University of Illinois	Champaign, Illinois	Active	
2	**Beta**	May 25, 1921	University of Oregon	Eugene, Oregon	Active	
3	Gamma	May 7, 1921	Northwestern University	Evanston, Illinois	Inactive	
4	**Delta**	June 11, 1921	University of Washington	Seattle, Washington	Active	
5	**Epsilon**	May 29, 1922	Oregon State University	Corvallis, Oregon	Active	
6	**Zeta**	June 1, 1923	University of North Dakota	Grand Forks, North Dakota	Active	
7	Eta	May 23, 1923 – 1929	Boston University	Boston, Massachusetts	Inactive	
8	Theta	May 21, 1924	University of Texas	Austin, Texas	Inactive	
9	**Iota**	February 21, 1925	University of Southern California	Los Angeles, California	Active	
10	Kappa	1927–1939	College of William & Mary	Williamsburg, Virginia	Inactive	
11	**Lambda**	May 1, 1925	University of California, Berkeley	Berkeley, California	Active	
12	**Mu**	1927	New York University	New York City, New York	Active	
13	**Nu**	1927	University of Colorado Boulder	Boulder, Colorado	Active	
14	**Xi**	1929	Syracuse University	Syracuse, New York	Active	
15	**Omicron**	1929	Ohio State University	Columbus, Ohio	Active	
16	**Pi**	1930	Case Western Reserve University	Cleveland, Ohio	Active	
17	Rho	1931	University of Minnesota	Minneapolis, Minnesota	Inactive	
18	**Sigma**	1932	University of Wisconsin–Madison	Madison, Wisconsin	Active	
19	Tau	1936	University of Maryland	College Park, Maryland	Inactive	
20	**Upsilon**	1938	University of Florida	Gainesville, Florida	Active	
21	**Phi**	1939	Louisiana State University	Baton Rouge, Louisiana	Active	
22	**Chi**	1939	Oklahoma State University–Stillwater	Stillwater, Oklahoma	Active	
23	**Psi**	1942	Marquette University	Milwaukee, Wisconsin	Active	
24	**Omega**	1942	Miami University	Oxford, Ohio	Active	
	Alpha Alpha				Unassigned	
25	**Alpha Beta**	1948	University of Alabama	Tuscaloosa, Alabama	Active	
26	**Alpha Gamma**	1949	Baruch College	New York City, New York	Active	
27	Alpha Delta	1949	University of Pennsylvania	Philadelphia, Pennsylvania	Inactive	
28	Alpha Epsilon	1950	Southern Methodist University	Dallas, Texas	Inactive	
29	**Alpha Zeta**	1950	University of Denver	Denver, Colorado	Active	
30	Alpha Eta	1951	University of Michigan	Ann Arbor, Michigan	Inactive	
31	**Alpha Theta**	1951	University of Mississippi	Oxford, Mississippi	Active	
32	**Alpha Iota**	1951	University of Arkansas	Fayetteville, Arkansas	Active	
33	**Alpha Kappa**	1952	Ohio University	Athens, Ohio	Active	
34	**Alpha Lambda**	1951	University of Tennessee	Knoxville, Tennessee	Active	
35	**Alpha Mu**	1952	University of Kentucky	Lexington, Kentucky	Active	
36	**Alpha Nu**	1953	Creighton University	Omaha, Nebraska	Active	
37	**Alpha Xi**	1954	University of Detroit Mercy	Detroit, Michigan	Active	
38	Alpha Omicron	1954	Michigan State University	East Lansing, Michigan	Inactive	
39	**Alpha Pi**	1954	University of Iowa	Iowa City, Iowa	Active	
40	Alpha Rho	1955–202x ?	Baylor University	Waco, Texas	Inactive	
41	**Alpha Sigma**	1955	University of Cincinnati	Cincinnati, Ohio	Active	
42	Alpha Tau	1955–1967	University of Pittsburgh	Pittsburgh, Pennsylvania	Inactive	
43	**Alpha Upsilon**	1955	Bowling Green State University	Bowling Green, Ohio	Active	
44	**Alpha Phi**	1956	Temple University	Philadelphia, Pennsylvania	Active	
45	**Alpha Chi**	1956	Louisiana Tech University	Ruston, Louisiana	Active	
46	**Alpha Psi**	1957	West Virginia University	Morgantown, West Virginia	Active	
47	**Alpha Omega**	1957	Fordham University	New York City, New York	Active	
48	**Beta Alpha**	1957	Indiana University Bloomington	Bloomington, Indiana	Active	
	Beta Beta				Unassigned	
49	**Beta Gamma**	1958	DePaul University	Chicago, Illinois	Active	
50	Beta Delta	1959	Texas Tech University	Lubbock, Texas	Inactive	
51	**Beta Epsilon**	1959	Lehigh University	Bethlehem, Pennsylvania	Active	
52	**Beta Zeta**	1960	Loyola University New Orleans	New Orleans, Louisiana	Active	
53	**Beta Eta**	1960	San Diego State University	San Diego, California	Active	
54	**Beta Theta**	1960	Pennsylvania State University	State College and College Township, Pennsylvania	Active	
55	**Beta Iota**	1960	Loyola University Chicago	Chicago, Illinois	Active	
56	**Beta Kappa**	1960	Mississippi State University	Starkville, Mississippi	Active	
57	**Beta Lambda**	1961	California State University, Los Angeles	Los Angeles, California	Active	
58	**Beta Mu**	1961	Georgia State University School of Accountancy	Atlanta, Georgia	Active	
59	**Beta Nu**	1961	Tulane University	New Orleans, Louisiana	Active	
60	**Beta Xi**	1961	University of Miami	Coral Gables, Florida	Active	
61	**Beta Omicron**	1961	University of Arizona	Tucson, Arizona	Active	
62	**Beta Pi**	1962	University of North Texas	Denton, Texas	Active	
63	**Beta Rho**	1962	Florida State University	Tallahassee, Florida	Active	
64	**Beta Sigma**	1962	University of Notre Dame	Notre Dame, Indiana	Active	
65	**Beta Tau**	1963–19xx ?; 2005	Arizona State University	Tempe, Arizona	Active	
66	**Beta Upsilon**	1963	University of Georgia	Athens, Georgia	Active	
67	**Beta Phi**	1964	California State University, Sacramento	Sacramento, California	Active	
68	**Beta Chi**	1964	San Francisco State University	San Francisco, California	Active	
69	**Beta Psi**	1964	Kent State University	Kent, Ohio	Active	
70	Beta Omega	1965	Texas Christian University	Fort Worth, Texas	Inactive	
71	**Gamma Alpha**	1964	Brigham Young University	Provo, Utah	Active	
72	**Gamma Beta**	1965	University of South Carolina	Columbia, South Carolina	Active	
	Gamma Gamma				Unassigned	
73	**Gamma Delta**	1966	University of Houston	Houston, Texas	Active	
74	**Gamma Epsilon**	1966	University of Toledo	Toledo, Ohio	Active	
75	**Gamma Zeta**	1966	Southern Illinois University Carbondale	Carbondale, Illinois	Active	
76	**Gamma Eta**	1967	University of Akron	Akron, Ohio	Active	
77	**Gamma Theta**	1967	University of Missouri	Columbia, Missouri	Active	
78	Gamma Iota	1967–1971	University of California, Los Angeles	Los Angeles, California	Inactive	
79	**Gamma Kappa**	1967	University of Nebraska Omaha	Omaha, Nebraska	Active	
80	**Gamma Lambda**	1967	Virginia Tech	Blacksburg, Virginia	Active	
81	**Gamma Mu**	1967	Drake University	Des Moines, Iowa	Active	
82	**Gamma Nu**	1968	Northeastern University	Boston, Massachusetts	Active	
83	**Gamma Xi**	1969	San Jose State University	San Jose, California	Active	
84	**Gamma Omicron**	1969	California State University, Fresno	Fresno, California	Active	
85	**Gamma Pi**	1971	Northern Illinois University	DeKalb, Illinois	Active	
86	**Gamma Rho**	1971	Western Michigan University	Kalamazoo, Michigan	Active	
87	**Gamma Sigma**	1971	University of New Orleans	New Orleans, Louisiana	Active	
88	**Gamma Tau**	1971	Colorado State University	Fort Collins, Colorado	Active	
89	**Gamma Upsilon**	1971	University of Rhode Island	Kingston, Rhode Island	Active	
90	**Gamma Phi**	1971	University of Texas at Arlington	Arlington, Texas	Active	
91	**Gamma Chi**	1971	University of Memphis	Memphis, Tennessee	Active	
92	**Gamma Psi**	1972	University of Missouri–St. Louis	St. Louis, Missouri	Active	
93	**Gamma Omega**	1972	California State University, Long Beach	Long Beach, California	Active	
94	**Delta Alpha**	1972	University of Wyoming	Laramie, Wyoming	Active	
95	**Delta Beta**	1972	California State University, Fullerton	Fullerton, California	Active	
96	**Delta Gamma**	1972	University of South Florida	Tampa, Florida	Active	
	Delta Delta				Unassigned	
97	**Delta Epsilon**	1973	Washington State University	Pullman, Washington	Active	
98	**Delta Zeta**	1973	California State University, Chico	Chico, California	Active	
99	**Delta Eta**	1973	Seattle University	Seattle, Washington	Active	
100	**Delta Theta**	1974	University of Hawaiʻi at Mānoa	Mānoa, Honolulu, Hawaii	Active	
101	Delta Iota	1974			Inactive	
102	**Delta Kappa**	1974	University of Montana	Missoula, Montana	Active	
103	**Delta Lambda**	1974	New Mexico State University	Las Cruces, New Mexico	Active	
104	Delta Mu	1975	University of Virginia	Charlottesville, Virginia	Inactive	
105	**Delta Nu**	1975	University of Massachusetts Amherst	Amherst, Massachusetts	Active	
106	**Delta Xi**	1975	Texas Southern University	Houston, Texas	Active	
107	**Delta Omicron**	1976	University of Nebraska–Lincoln	Lincoln, Nebraska	Active	
108	**Delta Pi**	1976	Hofstra University	Hempstead, New York	Active	
109	**Delta Rho**	1976	Pacific Lutheran University	Parkland, Washington	Active	
110	**Delta Sigma**	1976	Eastern Washington University	Cheney, Washington	Active	
111	Delta Tau	1976	Drexel University	Philadelphia, Pennsylvania	Inactive	
112	**Delta Upsilon**	1977	Northern Arizona University	Flagstaff, Arizona	Active	
113	Delta Phi	1977			Inactive	
114	**Delta Chi**	1977	University of Alabama at Birmingham	Birmingham, Alabama	Active	
115	**Delta Psi**	1977	Cleveland State University	Cleveland, Ohio	Active	
116	**Delta Omega**	1977	Utah State University	Logan, Utah	Active	
117	**Epsilon Alpha**	1977	Portland State University	Portland, Oregon	Active	
118	**Epsilon Beta**	1977	University of South Alabama	Mobile, Alabama	Active	
119	**Epsilon Gamma**	1977	University of Central Florida	Orlando, Florida	Active	
120	**Epsilon Delta**	1977	University of Missouri–Kansas City	Kansas City, Missouri	Active	
	Epsilon Epsilon				Unassigned	
121	**Epsilon Zeta**	1977	Virginia Commonwealth University	Richmond, Virginia	Active	
122	Epsilon Eta	197x ?			Inactive	
123	**Epsilon Theta**	1978	Kansas State University	Manhattan, Kansas	Active	
124	**Epsilon Iota**	1978	University of San Francisco	San Francisco, California	Active	
125	**Epsilon Kappa**	1978	Appalachian State University	Boone, North Carolina	Active	
126	**Epsilon Lambda**	1978	University of Connecticut	Storrs, Connecticut	Active	
127	**Epsilon Mu**	1978	Stephen F. Austin State University	Nacogdoches, Texas	Active	
128	**Epsilon Nu**	1978	Murray State University	Murray, Kentucky	Active	
129	**Epsilon Xi**	1978	University of Utah	Salt Lake City, Utah	Active	
130	**Epsilon Omicron**	1978	Auburn University	Auburn, Alabama	Active	
131	**Epsilon Pi**	1979	University of Arkansas at Little Rock	Little Rock, Arkansas	Active	
132	**Epsilon Rho**	1979	University of Wisconsin–Whitewater	Whitewater, Wisconsin	Active	
133	**Epsilon Sigma**	1979	George Washington University	Washington, D.C.	Active	
134	**Epsilon Tau**	1979	Wichita State University	Wichita, Kansas	Active	
135	**Epsilon Upsilon**	1979	Emory University Goizueta Business School	Atlanta, Georgia	Active	
136	**Epsilon Phi**	1979	Wayne State University	Detroit, Michigan	Active	
137	**Epsilon Chi**	1979	California State University, Northridge	Los Angeles, California	Active	
138	**Epsilon Psi**	1979	California State University, East Bay	Hayward, California	Active	
139	**Epsilon Omega**	1980	Eastern Michigan University	Ypsilanti, Michigan	Active	
140	**Zeta Alpha**	1980	Purdue University	West Lafayette, Indiana	Active	
141	**Zeta Beta**	1980	Western Illinois University	Macomb, Illinois	Active	
142	**Zeta Gamma**	1980	Middle Tennessee State University	Murfreesboro, Tennessee	Active	
143	**Zeta Delta**	1980	Georgia Southern University	Statesboro, Georgia	Active	
144	**Zeta Epsilon**	1981	Texas A&M University–Commerce	Commerce, Texas	Active	
	Zeta Zeta				Unassigned	
145	**Zeta Eta**	1981–19xx ?; 2017	Clarkson University	Potsdam, New York	Active	
146	**Zeta Theta**	1981	University at Buffalo	Buffalo, New York	Active	
147	**Zeta Iota**	1981	University of Nevada, Reno	Reno, Nevada	Active	
148	**Zeta Kappa**	1981	University of San Diego	San Diego, California	Active	
149	**Zeta Lambda**	1981	Bradley University	Peoria, Illinois	Active	
150	**Zeta Mu**	1982	University of Southern Mississippi	Hattiesburg, Mississippi	Active	
151	**Zeta Nu**	1982	Saint Louis University	St. Louis, Missouri	Active	
152	**Zeta Xi**	1982	Seton Hall University	South Orange, New Jersey	Active	
153	**Zeta Omicron**	1982	University of Wisconsin–Eau Claire	Eau Claire, Wisconsin	Active	
154	**Zeta Pi**	1982	Old Dominion University	Norfolk, Virginia	Active	
155	**Zeta Rho**	1983	Clemson University	Clemson, South Carolina	Active	
156	**Zeta Sigma**	1983	North Carolina A&T State University	Greensboro, North Carolina	Active	
157	**Zeta Tau**	1983	Lamar University	Beaumont, Texas	Active	
158	**Zeta Upsilon**	1983	University of Houston–Clear Lake	Pasadena and Houston, Texas	Active	
159	**Zeta Phi**	1983	Tennessee Tech	Cookeville, Tennessee	Active	
160	**Zeta Chi**	1984	University of North Carolina at Greensboro	Greensboro, North Carolina	Active	
161	**Zeta Psi**	1984	Boise State University	Boise, Idaho	Active	
162	**Zeta Omega**	1984	Ball State University	Muncie, Indiana	Active	
163	**Eta Alpha**	1984	University of North Carolina at Charlotte	Charlotte, North Carolina	Active	
164	**Eta Beta**	1984	University of Texas at San Antonio	San Antonio, Texas	Active	
165	**Eta Gamma**	1984	University of Louisville	Louisville, Kentucky	Active	
166	**Eta Delta**	1985	James Madison University	Harrisonburg, Virginia	Active	
167	**Eta Epsilon**	1985	Central Michigan University	Mount Pleasant, Michigan	Active	
168	**Eta Zeta**	1985	University of Dayton	Dayton, Ohio	Active	
	Eta Eta				Unassigned	
169	**Eta Theta**	1985	University of Wisconsin–Milwaukee	Milwaukee, Wisconsin	Active	
170	**Eta Iota**	1986	Florida International University	Miami, Florida	Active	
171	**Eta Kappa**	1986	University of Tennessee at Chattanooga	Chattanooga, Tennessee	Active	
172	**Eta Lambda**	1986	Idaho State University	Pocatello, Idaho	Active	
173	**Eta Mu**	1986	St. John's University	New York City, New York	Active	
174	**Eta Nu**	1987	Howard University	Washington, D.C.	Active	
175	**Eta Xi**	1988	University of Michigan–Flint	Flint, Michigan	Active	
176	**Eta Omicron**	1988	Western Kentucky University	Bowling Green, Kentucky	Active	
177	**Eta Pi**	1990	University at Albany, SUNY	Albany, New York	Active	
178	**Eta Rho**	1990	University of Tulsa	Tulsa, Oklahoma	Active	
179	**Eta Sigma**	1990	University of Louisiana at Monroe	Monroe, Louisiana	Active	
180	**Eta Tau**	1990	Florida Atlantic University	Boca Raton, Florida	Active	
181	**Eta Upsilon**	1991	Loyola University Maryland	Baltimore, Maryland	Active	
182	**Eta Phi**	1991	Oakland University	Oakland County, Michigan	Active	
183	**Eta Chi**	1991	Montana State University	Bozeman, Montana	Active	
184	**Eta Psi**	1991	Wright State University	Fairborn, Ohio	Active	
185	**Eta Omega**	1992	East Tennessee State University	Johnson City, Tennessee	Active	
186	**Theta Alpha**	1992	George Mason University	Fairfax, Virginia	Active	
187	**Theta Beta**	1992	University of Texas at El Paso	El Paso, Texas	Active	
188	**Theta Gamma**	1992	Bentley University	Waltham, Massachusetts	Active	
189	**Theta Delta**	1993	Suffolk University	Boston, Massachusetts	Active	
190	**Theta Epsilon**	1993	Indiana State University	Terre Haute, Indiana	Active	
191	**Theta Zeta**	1993	Millsaps College	Jackson, Mississippi	Active	
192	**Theta Eta**	1993	Southeastern Louisiana University	Hammond, Louisiana	Active	
	Theta Theta				Unassigned	
193	**Theta Iota**	1993	University of Baltimore	Baltimore, Maryland	Active	
194	**Theta Kappa**	1994	University of Illinois Chicago	Chicago, Illinois	Active	
195	**Theta Lambda**	1994	University of Central Arkansas	Conway, Arkansas	Active	
196	**Theta Mu**	1994	Rutgers University–New Brunswick	New Brunswick and Piscataway, New Jersey	Active	
197	**Theta Nu**	1994	Fort Lewis College	Durango, Colorado	Active	
198	**Theta Xi**	1994	University of New Mexico	Albuquerque, New Mexico	Active	
199	**Theta Omicron**	1994	University of Nevada, Las Vegas	Paradise, Nevada	Active	
200	**Theta Pi**	1995	Missouri State University	Springfield, Missouri	Active	
201	**Theta Rho**	1995	Binghamton University	Binghamton, New York	Active	
202	**Theta Sigma**	1995	University of Colorado Denver	Denver, Colorado	Active	
203	**Theta Tau**	1995	Weber State University	Ogden, Utah	Active	
204	**Theta Upsilon**	1996	University of South Dakota	Vermillion, South Dakota	Active	
205	**Theta Phi**	1996	Western Washington University	Bellingham, Washington	Active	
206	**Theta Chi**	1996	Duquesne University	Pittsburgh, Pennsylvania	Active	
207	**Theta Psi**	1996	University of Northern Colorado	Greeley, Colorado	Active	
208	**Theta Omega**	1997	Eastern Illinois University	Charleston, Illinois	Active	
209	**Iota Alpha**	1997	University of North Carolina Wilmington	Wilmington, North Carolina	Active	
210	**Iota Beta**	1997	Iowa State University	Ames, Iowa	Active	
211	**Iota Gamma**	1997	University of Idaho	Moscow, Idaho	Active	
212	**Iota Delta**	1997	Gonzaga University	Spokane, Washington	Active	
214	**Iota Zeta**	1997	Towson University	Towson, Maryland	Active	
215	**Iota Eta**	1997	California State University, San Bernardino	San Bernardino, California	Active	
216	**Iota Theta**	1998	University of Alabama in Huntsville	Huntsville, Alabama	Active	
	Iota Iota				Unassigned	
217	**Iota Kappa**	1998	University of the Pacific	Stockton, California	Active	
218	**Iota Lambda**	1998	Pace University	New York City, New York	Active	
219	**Iota Mu**	1998	University of Central Missouri	Warrensburg, Missouri	Active	
220	**Iota Nu**	1998	University of Oklahoma	Norman, Oklahoma	Active	
221	**Iota Xi**	1998	East Carolina University	Greenville, North Carolina	Active	
222	Iota Omicron	1998			Inactive	
223	**Iota Pi**	1998	Salisbury University	Salisbury, Maryland	Active	
224	**Iota Rho**	1999	University of Wisconsin–Oshkosh	Oshkosh, Wisconsin	Active	
225	**Iota Sigma**	1999	Nicholls State University	Thibodaux, Louisiana	Active	
226	**Iota Tau**	1999	Kennesaw State University	Cobb County, Georgia	Active	
227	**Iota Upsilon**	1999	University of Wisconsin–La Crosse	La Crosse, Wisconsin	Active	
228	**Iota Phi**	1999	University of West Florida	Pensacola, Florida	Active	
229	**Iota Chi**	2000	California State Polytechnic University, Pomona	Pomona, California	Active	
230	**Iota Psi**	2000	Fairfield University	Fairfield, Connecticut	Active	
231	**Iota Omega**	2000	North Carolina State University	Raleigh, North Carolina	Active	
232	**Kappa Alpha**	2000	Morgan State University	Baltimore, Maryland	Active	
233	**Kappa Beta**	2000	Grand Valley State University	Allendale, Michigan	Active	
234	**Kappa Gamma**	2000	Rutgers University–Camden	Camden, New Jersey	Active	
235	**Kappa Delta**	2000	Illinois State University	Normal, Illinois	Active	
236	**Kappa Epsilon**	2000	Rider University	Lawrence Township, New Jersey	Active	
237	**Kappa Zeta**	2001	St. John's University Staten Island Campus	Staten Island, New York	Active	
238	**Kappa Eta**	2001	Texas State University	San Marcos, Texas	Active	
239	**Kappa Theta**	2001	University of Louisiana at Lafayette	Lafayette, Louisiana	Active	
240	**Kappa Iota**	2001	Widener University	Chester, Pennsylvania	Active	
	Kappa Kappa				Unassigned	
241	**Kappa Lambda**	2001	Southern Illinois University Edwardsville	Edwardsville, Illinois	Active	
242	**Kappa Mu**	2001	Sam Houston State University	Huntsville, Texas	Active	
243	**Kappa Nu**	2001	Truman State University	Kirksville, Missouri	Active	
244	**Kappa Xi**	2002	Youngstown State University	Youngstown, Ohio	Active	
245	**Kappa Omicron**	2002	LIU Post	Brookville, New York	Active	
246	**Kappa Pi**	2002	Samford University	Homewood, Alabama	Active	
247	**Kappa Rho**	2002	Winthrop University	Rock Hill, South Carolina	Active	
248	**Kappa Sigma**	2003	University of Michigan–Dearborn	Dearborn, Michigan	Active	
	Kappa Tau				Unassigned	
249	**Kappa Upsilon**	2003	University of Pittsburgh	Pittsburgh, Pennsylvania	Active	
250	**Kappa Phi**	2003	Marshall University	Huntington, West Virginia	Active	
251	**Kappa Chi**	2003	Western Illinois University ‐ Quad Cities	Moline, Illinois	Active	
253	**Kappa Omega**	2004	Villanova University	Villanova, Pennsylvania	Active	
254	**Lambda Alpha**	2004	University of Kansas	Lawrence, Kansas	Active	
255	**Lambda Beta**	2004	University of Tampa	Tampa, Florida	Active	
256	**Lambda Gamma**	2004	Pittsburg State University	Pittsburg, Kansas	Active	
257	**Lambda Delta**	2005	Stetson University	DeLand, Florida	Active	
259	**Lambda Zeta**	2005	State University of New York at Oswego	Oswego, New York	Active	
260	**Lambda Eta**	2005	Marist University	Poughkeepsie, New York	Active	
261	**Lambda Theta**	2005	South Carolina State University	Orangeburg, South Carolina	Active	
262	**Lambda Iota**	2005	Northern Michigan University	Marquette, Michigan	Active	
263	**Lambda Kappa**	2005	Coastal Carolina University	Conway, South Carolina	Active	
	Lambda Lambda				Unassigned	
264	**Lambda Mu**	2006	University of Southern Indiana	Evansville, Indiana	Active	
265	**Lambda Nu**	2006	Belmont University	Nashville, Tennessee	Active	
266	**Lambda Xi**	2006	Elon University	Elon, North Carolina	Active	
267	**Lambda Omicron**	2006	University of Texas at Dallas	Richardson, Texas	Active	
268	**Lambda Pi**	2006	Manhattan College	Bronx, New York City, New York	Active	
269	**Lambda Rho**	2006	California State University, Stanislaus	Turlock, California	Active	
270	**Lambda Sigma**	2006	University of California, Los Angeles	Los Angeles, California	Active	
	Lambda Tau				Unassigned	
271	**Lambda Upsilon**	2006	Seattle Pacific University	Seattle, Washington	Active	
272	**Lambda Phi**	2006	Georgia College & State University	Milledgeville, Georgia	Active	
273	**Lambda Chi**	2007	Niagara University	Lewiston, New York	Active	
274	**Lambda Psi**	2007	Emporia State University	Emporia, Kansas	Active	
275	**Lambda Omega**	2008	University of Sydney ‐ Australia	Sydney, Australia	Active	
276	**Mu Alpha**	2008	Ithaca College	Ithaca, New York	Active	
277	**Mu Beta**	2008	College of Charleston	Charleston, South Carolina	Active	
278	**Mu Delta**	2009	Ohio Northern University	Ada, Ohio	Active	
279	**Mu Gamma**	2009	University of South Florida St. Petersburg	St. Petersburg, Florida	Active	
280	Mu Epsilon	2009			Inactive	
281	**Mu Zeta**	2009	Valdosta State University	Valdosta, Georgia	Active	
282	**Mu Eta**	2009	The College of New Jersey	Ewing Township, New Jersey	Active	
283	**Mu Theta**	2009	Tennessee State University	Nashville, Tennessee	Active	
284	**The Auckland** **(Mu Iota)**	2009	University of Auckland Business School	Auckland, New Zealand	Active	
285	**Mu Kappa**	2009	University of Texas at Tyler	Tyler, Texas	Active	
286	**Mu Lambda**	2010	Florida Gulf Coast University	Fort Myers, Florida	Active	
	Mu Mu				Unassigned	
287	**Mu Nu**	2010	University of Nebraska at Kearney	Kearney, Nebraska	Active	
288	**Mu Xi**	2010	Southeast Missouri State University	Cape Girardeau, Missouri	Active	
289	**Mu Omicron**	2010	Washburn University	Topeka, Kansas	Active	
290	**Mu Pi**	2011	Utah Valley University	Orem, Utah	Active	
291	Mu Rho	2011			Inactive	
292	Mu Sigma	2011			Inactive	
293	**Mu Upsilon**	2011	Adelphi University	Garden City, New York	Active	
294	**Mu Phi**	2012	University of Massachusetts Dartmouth	Dartmouth, Massachusetts	Active	
295	**Mu Chi**	2012	University of Hartford	West Hartford, Connecticut	Active	
296	**Mu Psi**	2012	University of Washington Bothell	Bothell, Washington	Active	
297	**Mu Omega**	2013	Stonehill College	Easton, Massachusetts	Active	
298	**Nu Alpha**	2013	Quinnipiac University	Hamden, Connecticut	Active	
299	**Nu Beta**	2013	Radford University	Radford, Virginia	Active	
300	**Nu Gamma**	2013	University of North Georgia	Dahlonega, Georgia	Active	
301	**Nu Delta**	2013	Western Carolina University	Cullowhee, North Carolina	Active	
302	**Upsilon Tau Sigma**	2013	University of Technology Sydney	Sydney, Australia	Active	
303	**Nu Epsilon**	2013	Central Washington University	Ellensburg, Washington	Active	
304	**Nu Zeta**	2014	West Chester University	West Chester, Pennsylvania	Active	
305	**Nu Theta**	2014	Washington State University Vancouver	Vancouver, Washington	Active	
306	**Waikato**	2014	University of Waikato	Hamilton, New Zealand	Active	
307	**Nu Iota**	2015	Washington University in St. Louis	St. Louis County, Missouri	Active	
308	**Victoria Wellington**	2015	Victoria University of Wellington	Wellington, New Zealand	Active	
309	**Nu Eta**	2013	University of Arkansas–Fort Smith	Fort Smith, Arkansas	Active	
310	**Nu Kappa**	2015	University of Scranton	Scranton, Pennsylvania	Active	
311	**Nu Lambda**	2016	Roger Williams University	Bristol, Rhode Island	Active	
312	**Nu Mu**	2016	Washington and Lee University	Lexington, Virginia	Active	
	Nu Nu				Unassigned	
313	**Nu Xi**	2016	Siena College	Loudonville, New York	Active	
314	**Nu Omicron**	2016	Iona University	New Rochelle, New York	Active	
315	**Nu Pi**	2016	University of California, Irvine	Irvine, California	Active	
316	**Nu Rho**	2016	University of California, Riverside	Riverside, California	Active	
317	**Nu Sigma**	2016	Fairleigh Dickinson University	Madison, New Jersey	Active	
	Nu Tau				Unassigned	
318	**Nu Upsilon**	2017	Mercer University	Macon, Georgia	Active	
319	**Nu Phi**	2016	Jacksonville State University	Jacksonville, Alabama	Active	
320	**Nu Chi**	2017	Minnesota State University Mankato	Mankato, Minnesota	Active	
321	**Nu Psi**	2017	Prairie View A&M University	Prairie View, Texas	Active	
322	**Nu Omega**	2017	University of Portland	Portland, Oregon	Active	
323	**Xi Alpha**	2017	University of South Carolina Upstate	Valley Falls, South Carolina	Active	
324	**Xi Beta**	2017	Purdue University Northwest	Hammond and Westville, Indiana	Active	
325	**Xi Gamma**	2018	Auburn University at Montgomery	Montgomery, Alabama	Active	
326	**Xi Delta**	2018	Robert Morris University	Moon Township, Pennsylvania	Active	
327	**Xi Epsilon**	2018	Monash University	Melbourne, Australia	Active	
328	**Xi Zeta**	2018	University of North Alabama	Florence, Alabama	Active	
329	**Xi Theta**	2018	Rowan University	Glassboro, New Jersey	Active	
330	**Xi Iota**	2019	Ramapo College	Mahwah, New Jersey	Active	
331	**Xi Eta**	2019	University of North Florida	Jacksonville, Florida	Active	
332	**Xi Kappa**	2017	Deakin University	Melbourne, Australia	Active	
333	**Xi Lambda**	2019	University of Melbourne	Melbourne, Australia	Active	
335	**Xi Nu**	2020	Northwestern State University	Natchitoches, Louisiana	Active	
	Xi Xi				Unassigned	
336	**Xi Omicron**	2020	Central Connecticut State University	New Britain, Connecticut	Active	
337	**Xi Pi**	2021	Simmons University	Boston, Massachusetts	Active	
338	**Xi Rho**	2021	King Abdulaziz University	Jeddah, Saudi Arabia	Active	
339	**Xi Sigma**	2022	Swinburne University of Technology	Hawthorn, Victoria, Australia	Active	
340	**Xi Tau**	2022	The Citadel	Charleston, South Carolina	Active	
341	**Xi Upsilon**	2023	Whitworth University	Spokane, Washington	Active	
342	**Xi Phi**	2023	University of Texas Rio Grande Valley	Edinburg, Texas	Active	
342	**Xi Chi**	2023	Troy University	Troy, Alabama	Active	
1402			University of New Haven	West Haven, Connecticut	Colony	
1419			University of California, San Diego	San Diego, California	Colony	
1421			University of New Hampshire	Durham, New Hampshire	Colony	
1423			Indiana University East	Richmond, Indiana	Colony	
1425			Stony Brook University	Stony Brook, New York	Colony	(Note: Colony was established in 2022.)
1426			Angelo State University	San Angelo, Texas	Colony	
1427			Clark University	Worcester, Massachusetts	Colony	
1428			University of South Carolina Aiken	Aiken, South Carolina	Colony	(Note: Colony was established in 2023)
1429			King's College	Wilkes-Barre, Pennsylvania	Colony	
1430			Arkansas State University	Jonesboro, Arkansas	Colony	
1431			Bucknell University	Lewisburg, Pennsylvania	Colony	
1432			Nova Southeastern University	Fort Lauderdale-Davie, Florida	Colony	
