= Croft State Park =

State park in South Carolina, United States

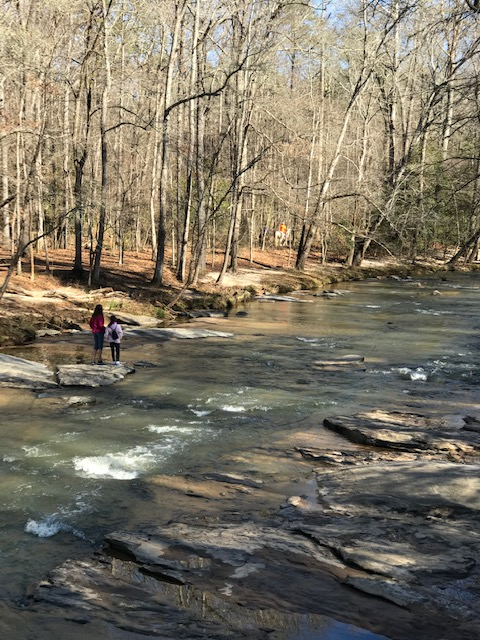
- Fairforest Creek, Croft State Park, January 2020
- Interactive map of Croft State Park
- Nearest city: Spartanburg, SC
- Coordinates: 34°52′31″N 81°50′28″W
- Area: 7,054 acres (29 km^{2})
- Open: 1949
- Camp sites: tent and RV sites
- Website: https://southcarolinaparks.com/croft

Croft State Park is a state park in Spartanburg County, South Carolina, located on land used during World War II as Camp Croft, a US Army basic training center and prisoner-of-war camp.

== History ==
The land that is now Croft State Park was farmed from the late 18th century, and old farmsteads can still be found in the park as well as six family cemeteries and two church cemeteries. During the Revolutionary War, a skirmish between Patriots and Loyalists was fought at the juncture of Fairforest and Kelsey creeks. In the late 19th century a four-story hotel at Whitestone Springs attracted resort visitors to the supposedly healing lithium springs. The hotel burned in 1930, but the spring and some foundations remain and are accessible via a hiking trail.

A year before the United States entered World War II, the federal government paid owners to appropriate their farm land and convert it into a basic training facility (Infantry Replacement Training Center) for the U.S. Army. Eventually a quarter million troops, including Henry Kissinger, and Dick Winters trained at the post, named for Major General Edward Croft (1874–1938), a native of Greenville, South Carolina, and a former chief of Army Infantry. Camp Croft boosted the local economy, especially during construction, though it also strained the housing, recreational, and health facilities of the small Upstate community. During the last year and a half of the war, nearly a thousand German prisoners of war were interned there.

Following deactivation of the base on July 31, 1945, the government sold 7,000 of its 19,000 acres to the state of South Carolina for use as a park, which opened in 1949. Land developed adjacent to the park to the north is now part of the Camp Croft community.

== Activities and amenities ==
Park activities include picnicking, camping, hiking, horseback riding, geocaching, mountain biking, and bird watching. Fishing is available on two lakes, including the 165-acre Lake Craig.

Amenities include a playground, picnic shelters, a shooting range, extensive mountain bike trails and a park store. Equestrian facilities include a stable with rental stalls, a show ring, and miles of horse trails.
