= Spartanburg County Foundation =

Spartanburg County Foundation is a 501(c)3 public charity based in Spartanburg County, South Carolina.

== Background ==
Spartanburg County Foundation was established in 1943 it is the oldest and second largest community foundation in South Carolina. Since inception the endowment funds it manages and the fundraising efforts it has guided have resulted in the distribution of imore than $120 million to nonprofit organizations. Since 1998, Spartanburg County Foundation has tripled its assets.

== Community leadership ==
Mary Thomas, the COO of the Spartanburg County Foundation, has been honored nationally for her work. In particular, her leadership of the Spartanburg Community Indicators Project (an effort to address issues of obesity, crime, and teen pregnancy prevention) has guided Spartanburg to pay attention to, and address, these local needs. Her efforts at encouraging grassroots leadership have earned her praise from The Council on Foundations.
