= Spartanburg County School District 5 =

School district in Spartanburg county, South Carolina

Spartanburg County School District Five

Address
- 100 North Danzler Road Spartanburg County, South Carolina Duncan, South Carolina, 29334; United States

District information
- Type: Public
- Grades: Pre-K through 12
- Superintendent: Randall Gary
- Asst. superintendent(s): Jeff Rogers
- Chair of the board: Millie Malone
- Schools: 14

Students and staff
- Students: 10,803
- Teachers: 576

Other information
- See Also: Spartanburg County School District 1; Spartanburg County School District 2; Spartanburg County School District 3; Spartanburg County School District 4; Spartanburg County School District 5; Spartanburg County School District 6; Spartanburg County School District 7
- Website: spart5.net

Spartanburg County School District 5 (SCSD5 or D5) is a public school district in Spartanburg County, South Carolina, US. Led by superintendent Dr. Randall Gary, the district operates fourteen schools.

== List of schools ==
The schools under Spartanburg County School District 5:

=== Elementary schools (Pre-K to 5th) ===
- Abner Creek Academy
- Berry Shoals Elementary School
- Duncan Elementary School of the Arts
- Lyman Elementary School
- Reidville Elementary School
- River Ridge Elementary School
- Tyger River Elementary School
- Wellford Academy of Science and Technology

=== Middle schools (6th to 8th) ===
- Abner Creek Middle School
- Beech Springs Middle School
- D.R. Hill Middle School
- Florence Chapel Middle School

=== Freshman academy (9th Only) ===
- Byrnes Freshman Academy

=== High school (10th to 12th) ===
- James F. Byrnes High School
