= Spartanburg County School District 2 =

School district in Spartanburg County, South Carolina

Spartanburg County School District Two

Address
- 3231 Old Furnace Road Spartanburg County, South Carolina Chesnee, South Carolina, 29323; United States

District information
- Type: Public
- Motto: Making a Difference for Students Every Day
- Grades: Pre-K through 12
- Asst. superintendent(s): Dr. Angela Hinton
- Chair of the board: Mr. Jason Seay
- Schools: 14
- Budget: $128,046,000
- NCES District ID: 4503510

Students and staff
- Students: 10,400

Other information
- See Also: Spartanburg County School District 1; Spartanburg County School District 2; Spartanburg County School District 3; Spartanburg County School District 4; Spartanburg County School District 5; Spartanburg County School District 6; Spartanburg County School District 7
- Website: www.spart2.org

Spartanburg County School District 2 is a public school district in Spartanburg County, South Carolina, US. The district consists of fourteen schools. The district also has a maintenance and transportation department to serve the students and staff. Students in the district have access to the Swofford Career Center, a vocational school shared with Spartanburg County School District 1.

The district serves much of northeastern Spartanburg County, including all of Boiling Springs, Chesnee and Mayo, most of Valley Falls, and a portion of Southern Shops.

The graduation rate for the district in 2019 was 90.5%, above the state average of 81.1%

== List of schools ==
=== Elementary schools ===
- Boiling Springs Elementary School
- Carlisle-Foster's Grove Elementary School
- Chesnee Elementary School
- Cooley Springs-Fingerville Elementary School
- Hendrix Elementary School
- Mayo Elementary School
- Oakland Elementary School
- Shoally Creek Elementary School
- Sugar Ridge Elementary School

=== Middle and junior high schools ===
- Boiling Springs Middle School
- Chesnee Middle School
- Rainbow Lake Middle School

=== High schools ===
- Boiling Springs High School
- Chesnee High School

== Awards and accolades ==
- In 2013, the district was recognized as the highest performing in South Carolina.
- In 2015, Boiling Springs High School teacher Hunter Jolly was named a finalist for the State Teacher of the Year Award.
- In 2016, the Boiling Springs High School Football Team was the South Carolina Upper State Champion and fell just short in the SC 5A Championship Game.
- In 2019, Carlisle-Foster's Grove Elementary was named a National Blue Ribbon School. In the same year, Abby Scruggs of Chesnee High School was named the president of the South Carolina Beta Club. In 2019, Boiling Springs Elementary School was named South Carolina's Distinguished Reading School.
- Chesnee High School's baseball team has won a total of five state championships. The cheer team has won four championships.
