= Stone Station, South Carolina =

Unincorporated community in South Carolina, US

Coordinates: 34°50′46″N 81°55′31″W

Stone Station is an unincorporated community in Spartanburg County, in the U.S. state of South Carolina.

== History ==
The community was named for J. M. Stone, who kept a local store. An old variant name of the community was Bishop. A post office called Bishop was established in 1895, and remained in operation until 1907.
