= Spartanburg County School District 4 =

School district in Spartanburg County, South Carolina

Spartanburg County School District Four

Address
- 118 McEdco Road Spartanburg County, South Carolina Woodruff, South Carolina, 29388; United States

District information
- Type: Public
- Grades: Pre-K through 12
- Superintendent: Dr. W. Rallie Liston
- Asst. superintendent(s): Karen Neal
- Business administrator: Chris Benfield
- Chair of the board: Milton C. Smith
- Schools: 4

Students and staff
- Students: 2,739
- Teachers: 166

Other information
- See Also: Spartanburg County School District 1; Spartanburg County School District 2; Spartanburg County School District 3; Spartanburg County School District 4; Spartanburg County School District 5; Spartanburg County School District 6; Spartanburg County School District 7
- Website: www.spartanburg4.org

Spartanburg County School District 4 (SCSD4) is a public school district in Spartanburg County, South Carolina, US. Led by superintendent Dr. W. Rallie Liston, the district operates four schools.

== List of schools ==
Spartanburg County School District 4 manages the following schools:

=== Primary schools ===
- Woodruff Primary School

=== Elementary schools ===
- Woodruff Elementary School

=== Intermediate schools ===
- Woodruff Intermediate

=== Middle and junior high schools ===
- Woodruff Middle School

=== High schools ===
- Woodruff High School
