= Clifton, South Carolina =

Clifton
- CDP
- Location within the state of South Carolina
- Coordinates: 34°59′05″N 81°49′20″W
- Country: United States
- State: South Carolina
- County: Spartanburg

Area
  - Total: 1.14 sq mi (2.95 km^{2})
  - Land: 1.07 sq mi (2.78 km^{2})
  - Water: 0.066 sq mi (0.17 km^{2})
- Elevation: 656 ft (200 m)

Population (2020)
  - Total: 544
  - Density: 507/sq mi (195.8/km^{2})
- Time zone: UTC-5 (Eastern (EST))
  - Summer (DST): UTC-4 (EDT)
- ZIP codes: 29324
- FIPS code: 45083
- GNIS feature ID: 2629821

Clifton is a Census-designated place located in Spartanburg County in the U.S. State of South Carolina. According to the 2010 United States census, the population was 541.

== Geography ==
Clifton is located in the East side of the county, between the cities of Spartanburg and Cowpens.

According to the United States Census Bureau, the CDP has a total land area of 1.073 square miles (2.946 km^{2}) and a total water area of 0.065 square mile (0.168 km^{2}).

== Demographics ==
Historical population
Census	Pop.	Note	%±
2020	544		—
U.S. Decennial Census

== Education ==
It is in the Spartanburg School District 3.
