= Converse, South Carolina =

Converse
- CDP
- Location within the state of South Carolina
- Coordinates: 34°59′50″N 81°50′35″W
- Country: United States
- State: South Carolina
- County: Spartanburg

Area
  - Total: 0.70 sq mi (1.82 km^{2})
  - Land: 0.69 sq mi (1.79 km^{2})
  - Water: 0.012 sq mi (0.03 km^{2})
- Elevation: 728 ft (222 m)

Population (2020)
  - Total: 534
  - Density: 773.7/sq mi (298.73/km^{2})
- Time zone: UTC-5 (Eastern (EST))
  - Summer (DST): UTC-4 (EDT)
- ZIP codes: 29329
- FIPS code: 45083
- GNIS feature ID: 2629822

Converse is a Census-designated place located in Spartanburg County in the U.S. State of South Carolina. According to the 2010 United States census, the population was 608.

== Geography ==
Converse is located in the east side of the county, between the city of Spartanburg and the town of Cowpens.

According to the United States Census Bureau, the CDP has a total land area of 0.690 square mile (1.786 km^{2}) and a total water area of 0.011 square miles (0.029 km^{2}).

== Demographics ==
Historical population
| Census | Pop. | Note | %± |
|---|---|---|---|
| 2010 | 608 | | — |
| 2020 | 534 | | −12.2% |
U.S. Decennial Census

Converse first appeared as a census designated place in the 2010 U.S. census.

=== Racial and ethnic composition ===
Converse CDP, South Carolina – Racial and ethnic composition Note: the US Census treats Hispanic/Latino as an ethnic category. This table excludes Latinos from the racial categories and assigns them to a separate category. Hispanics/Latinos may be of any race.
| Race / Ethnicity (NH = Non-Hispanic) | Pop 2010 | Pop 2020 | % 2010 | % 2020 |
|---|---|---|---|---|
| White alone (NH) | 549 | 450 | 90.30% | 84.27% |
| Black or African American alone (NH) | 36 | 25 | 5.92% | 4.68% |
| Native American or Alaska Native alone (NH) | 2 | 0 | 0.33% | 0.00% |
| Asian alone (NH) | 2 | 2 | 0.33% | 0.37% |
| Native Hawaiian or Pacific Islander alone (NH) | 0 | 0 | 0.00% | 0.00% |
| Other race alone (NH) | 0 | 0 | 0.00% | 0.00% |
| Mixed race or Multiracial (NH) | 6 | 40 | 0.99% | 7.49% |
| Hispanic or Latino (any race) | 13 | 17 | 2.14% | 3.18% |
| Total | 608 | 534 | 100.00% | 100.00% |

== Education ==
It is in the Spartanburg School District 3.

== Notable person ==
- Art Fowler, pitcher and pitching coach in Major League Baseball
