= Fairforest, South Carolina =

Fairforest
- CDP
- Location within the state of South Carolina
- Coordinates: 34°57′12″N 82°00′57″W
- Country: United States
- State: South Carolina
- County: Spartanburg

Area
  - Total: 2.10 sq mi (5.43 km^{2})
  - Land: 2.09 sq mi (5.42 km^{2})
  - Water: 0.0039 sq mi (0.01 km^{2})
- Elevation: 846 ft (258 m)

Population (2020)
  - Total: 1,646
  - Density: 786.9/sq mi (303.84/km^{2})
- Time zone: UTC-5 (Eastern (EST))
  - Summer (DST): UTC-4 (EDT)
- ZIP codes: 29301
- FIPS code: 45083
- GNIS feature ID: 2629825

Fairforest is a Census-designated place located in Spartanburg County in the U.S. State of South Carolina. According to the 2010 United States census, the population was 1,646.

== History ==
During the Revolution, Fairforest was one of the only regions in South Carolina where Loyalists outnumbered Patriots. It was described as a "hot-bed of pro-British sentiment." A post office was established as Fair Forest in 1884. According to tradition, a pioneer named the region when, noting the scenery, he said "What a fair forest!"

== Geography ==
The CDP is a suburb of the City of Spartanburg, located to the West of the city, alongside Arcadia and Saxon.

According to the United States Census Bureau, the CDP has a total land area of 5.416 square miles (3.973 km^{2}) and a total water area of 0.006 square miles (0.016 km^{2}).

== Demographics ==
Historical population
Census	Pop.	Note	%±
2020	1,646		—
U.S. Decennial Census

== Education ==
It is in Spartanburg County School District 6.
