= Spartanburg County School District 6 =

School district in Spartanburg county, South Carolina

Spartanburg County School District Six

Address
- 1390 Cavalier Way Spartanburg County, South Carolina Roebuck, South Carolina, 29376; United States

District information
- Type: Public
- Grades: Pre-K through 12
- Superintendent: Ken Kiser
- Business administrator: Dr. Omar Daniels
- Schools: 13

Students and staff
- Students: 11,354
- Teachers: 726

Other information
- See Also: Spartanburg County School District 1; Spartanburg County School District 2; Spartanburg County School District 3; Spartanburg County School District 4; Spartanburg County School District 5; Spartanburg County School District 6; Spartanburg County School District 7
- Website: www.spart6.org

Spartanburg County School District 6 (SCSD6) is a public school district in Spartanburg County, South Carolina, US. Led by superintendent Ken Kiser, the district operates thirteen schools.

It serves western Spartanburg as well as Arcadia, Fairforest, Glenn Springs, Pauline, Roebuck, and most of Arkwright, Hilltop, Saxon and Southern Shops.

== List of schools ==
=== Elementary schools ===
- Anderson Mill Elementary
- Arcadia Elementary
- Fairforest Elementary
- Jessee S. Bobo Elementary
- Lone Oak Elementary
- Pauline-Glenn Springs Elementary
- Roebuck Elementary
- West View Elementary
- Woodland Heights Elementary

=== Middle and junior high schools ===
- Fairforest Middle
- Gable Middle
- R. P. Dawkins Middle

=== High schools ===
- Dorman Freshman Campus
- Dorman High School
- RD Anderson Applied Technology Center
