= Inman Mills, South Carolina =

- CDP
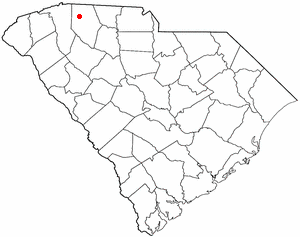
- Location of Inman Mills, South Carolina
- Coordinates: 35°02′27″N 82°06′09″W
- Country: United States
- State: South Carolina
- County: Spartanburg

Area
  - Total: 1.08 sq mi (2.80 km^{2})
  - Land: 1.08 sq mi (2.80 km^{2})
  - Water: 0 sq mi (0.00 km^{2})
- Elevation: 889 ft (271 m)

Population (2020)
  - Total: 1,233
  - Density: 1,142.2/sq mi (441.02/km^{2})
- Time zone: UTC-5 (Eastern (EST))
  - Summer (DST): UTC-4 (EDT)
- ZIP code: 29349
- Area codes: 864, 821
- FIPS code: 45-35800
- GNIS feature ID: 2402615

Inman Mills is a census-designated place (CDP) in Spartanburg County, South Carolina, United States. The population was 1,050 at the 2010 census.

== Geography ==
Inman Mills lies adjacent to the incorporated city of Inman.

According to the United States Census Bureau, the CDP has a total area of 1.3 square miles (3.4 km^{2}), all land.

== Demographics ==
Historical population
Census	Pop.	Note	%±
2000	1,151		—
2010	1,050		−8.8%
2020	1,233		17.4%
U.S. Decennial Census

As of the census of 2000, there were 1,151 people, 435 households, and 261 families residing in the CDP. The population density was 911.5 inhabitants per square mile (351.9/km^{2}). There were 464 housing units at an average density of 367.5 per square mile (141.9/km^{2}). The racial makeup of the CDP was 90.88% White, 7.12% African American, 0.09% Asian, 1.13% from other races, and 0.78% from two or more races. Hispanic or Latino of any race were 2.95% of the population.

There were 435 households, out of which 21.1% had children under the age of 18 living with them, 43.9% were married couples living together, 12.9% had a female householder with no husband present, and 39.8% were non-families. 37.0% of all households were made up of individuals, and 23.4% had someone living alone who was 65 years of age or older. The average household size was 2.07 and the average family size was 2.65.

In the CDP, the population was spread out, with 13.9% under the age of 18, 6.2% from 18 to 24, 20.8% from 25 to 44, 19.3% from 45 to 64, and 39.9% who were 65 years of age or older. The median age was 54 years. For every 100 females, there were 60.8 males. For every 100 females age 18 and over, there were 57.3 males.

The median income for a household in the CDP was $26,776, and the median income for a family was $37,391. Males had a median income of $26,838 versus $19,922 for females. The per capita income for the CDP was $15,958. About 4.2% of families and 28.1% of the population were below the poverty line, including 7.0% of those under age 18 and 54.3% of those age 65 or over.

== Education ==
It is in the Spartanburg School District 1.
