= Arkwright, South Carolina =

- Census-designated place
- Location within South Carolina Location within the United States
- Coordinates: 34°54′47″N 81°56′22″W
- Country: United States
- State: South Carolina
- County: Spartanburg

Area
  - Total: 2.62 sq mi (6.79 km^{2})
  - Land: 2.58 sq mi (6.69 km^{2})
  - Water: 0.039 sq mi (0.10 km^{2})
- Elevation: 748 ft (228 m)

Population (2020)
  - Total: 2,311
  - Density: 894/sq mi (345.3/km^{2})
- Time zone: UTC-5 (Eastern (EST))
  - Summer (DST): UTC-4 (EDT)
- ZIP Codes: 29306 (Spartanburg); 29376 (Roebuck)
- Area codes: 864, 821
- FIPS code: 45-02530
- GNIS feature ID: 2807075

Arkwright is an unincorporated area and census-designated place (CDP) adjacent to the city of Spartanburg in Spartanburg County, South Carolina, United States. It was first listed as a CDP prior to the 2020 census with a population of 2,311.

The CDP is in central Spartanburg County and is bordered to the north and west by the city of Spartanburg. It is bordered to the south by unincorporated Roebuck. The CDP takes its name from the Arkwright neighborhood of Spartanburg, directly to the north.

U.S. Route 221 is the main road through the community, leading north 2.5 miles (4.0 km) to the center of Spartanburg and southwest 15 miles (24 km) to Woodruff.

== Demographics ==
Historical population
Census	Pop.	Note	%±
2020	2,311		—
U.S. Decennial Census; 2020

Arkwright first appeared as a census designated place in the 2020 U.S. census.

=== 2020 census ===
Arkwright CDP, South Carolina – Racial and ethnic composition Note: the US Census treats Hispanic/Latino as an ethnic category. This table excludes Latinos from the racial categories and assigns them to a separate category. Hispanics/Latinos may be of any race.
Race / Ethnicity (NH = Non-Hispanic)	Pop 2020	% 2020
White alone (NH)	784	33.92%
Black or African American alone (NH)	1,150	49.76%
Native American or Alaska Native alone (NH)	4	0.17%
Asian alone (NH)	76	3.29%
Pacific Islander alone (NH)	1	0.04%
Other Race alone (NH)	17	0.74%
Mixed race or Multiracial (NH)	97	4.20%
Hispanic or Latino (any race)	182	7.88%
Total	2,311	100.00%

== Education ==
Most of the CDP is in the Spartanburg School District 6 while some of it is in the Spartanburg School District 7.
