= Camp Croft, South Carolina =

- Census-designated place
- Location within South Carolina Location within the United States
- Coordinates: 34°54′32″N 81°52′05″W
- Country: United States
- State: South Carolina
- County: Spartanburg

Area
  - Total: 2.66 sq mi (6.89 km^{2})
  - Land: 2.65 sq mi (6.86 km^{2})
  - Water: 0.0077 sq mi (0.02 km^{2})
- Elevation: 656 ft (200 m)

Population (2020)
  - Total: 2,110
  - Density: 796.5/sq mi (307.52/km^{2})
- Time zone: UTC-5 (Eastern (EST))
  - Summer (DST): UTC-4 (EDT)
- ZIP Code: 29302 (Spartanburg)
- Area codes: 864, 821
- FIPS code: 45-11035
- GNIS feature ID: 2807092

Camp Croft is an unincorporated area and census-designated place (CDP) in Spartanburg County, South Carolina, United States. It was first listed as a CDP prior to the 2020 census. The 2020 census lists a population of 2,110.

== Geography ==
The CDP is in eastern Spartanburg County and is bordered to the north by Ben Avon. South Carolina Highway 295 (Southport Road) forms the northern border of the CDP; Spartanburg is 5 miles (8 km) to the northwest, and Pacolet is 7 miles (11 km) to the east.

The Creek Golf Club is in the center of the community, and Kelsey Creek, a south-flowing tributary of Fairforest Creek and part of the Tyger River watershed, forms the southwest boundary. Croft State Park borders the community to the south.

== History ==
=== World War II ===
A U.S. Army base named Camp Croft was organized on what is now the area of the Camp Croft CDP during World War II. The base served as an Infantry Replacement Training Center and trained 60,000 soldiers per year from 1941 to 1946. Among the trainees was Henry Kissinger. Kissinger was naturalized at Camp Croft and would later serve as Secretary of State under President Nixon. In the later years of the war, a prisoner-of-war camp was established at Camp Croft and almost 1,000 German prisoners were held there. After the war, Camp Croft was not retained as a military installation and the land was returned to civilian control. The former base was redeveloped partly as a residential neighborhood and partly as Croft State Park.

== Demographics ==
Historical population
Census	Pop.	Note	%±
2020	2,110		—
U.S. Decennial Census; 2020

Camp Croft first appeared as a census designated place in the 2020 U.S. census.

=== 2020 census ===
Camp Croft CDP, South Carolina – Demographic Profile (NH = Non-Hispanic)
Race / Ethnicity	Pop 2020	% 2020
White alone (NH)	804	38.10%
Black or African American alone (NH)	778	36.87%
Native American or Alaska Native alone (NH)	8	0.38%
Asian alone (NH)	304	14.41%
Pacific Islander alone (NH)	6	0.28%
Some Other Race alone (NH)	3	0.14%
Mixed Race/Multi-Racial (NH)	78	3.70%
Hispanic or Latino (any race)	129	6.11%
Total	2,110	100.00%

Note: the US Census treats Hispanic/Latino as an ethnic category. This table excludes Latinos from the racial categories and assigns them to a separate category. Hispanics/Latinos can be of any race.

== Education ==
It is in the Spartanburg School District 7.
