= Chesnee High School =

Location
- 795 South Alabama Avenue; Chesnee, South Carolina 29323; United States; 35°7′59″N 81°51′37″W

Information
- Founded: 1911 (115 years ago)
- School district: Spartanburg County School District 2
- Principal: Erik Gerstenacker
- Teaching staff: 46.00 (FTE)
- Enrollment: 796 (2023–2024)
- Student to teacher ratio: 17.30
- Colors: Black and gold
- Mascot: Eagle
- Rival: Woodruff High School
- Website: chs.spart2.org

Chesnee High School is a high school located in the northern part of Spartanburg County, South Carolina, in the foothills of the Blue Ridge Mountains.

The school has an average enrollment of approximately 700 students and offers numerous sports including: football, baseball, softball, competitive cheer, wrestling, golf, tennis, fishing, and competitive marching band. Chesnee High School's Baseball and Competitive Cheer programs have each won 5 State Championships. Chesnee High School also holds a marching band competition named the Eagle Classic.

The school's staff includes three administrators, 45 teachers and 32 support staff.

== Athletics ==
=== State championships ===
- Baseball: 1983, 1984, 1988, 2010, 2013
- Competitive Cheer: 2013, 2014, 2015, 2019
- Golf - Girls: 2021, 2022, 2023
- Track - Boys: 2010
- Volleyball: 2020
