= Central Pacolet, South Carolina =

- Town
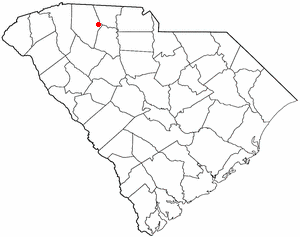
- Location of Central Pacolet, South Carolina
- Coordinates: 34°54′38″N 81°45′05″W
- Country: United States
- State: South Carolina
- County: Spartanburg

Area
  - Total: 0.24 sq mi (0.61 km^{2})
  - Land: 0.24 sq mi (0.61 km^{2})
  - Water: 0 sq mi (0.00 km^{2})
- Elevation: 702 ft (214 m)

Population (2020)
  - Total: 209
  - Density: 884.0/sq mi (341.32/km^{2})
- Time zone: UTC-5 (Eastern (EST))
  - Summer (DST): UTC-4 (EDT)
- ZIP code: 29372
- Area codes: 864, 821
- FIPS code: 45-13060
- GNIS feature ID: 2406248

Central Pacolet is a town in Spartanburg County, South Carolina, United States, along the Pacolet River. As of the 2020 census, Central Pacolet had a population of 209.

== Geography ==
According to the United States Census Bureau, the town has a total area of 0.2 square miles (0.52 km^{2}), all land.

== Demographics ==
Historical population
Census	Pop.	Note	%±
1960	333		—
1970	483		45.0%
1980	315		−34.8%
1990	257		−18.4%
2000	267		3.9%
2010	216		−19.1%
2020	209		−3.2%
U.S. Decennial Census

As of the census of 2000, there were 267 people, 125 households, and 70 families residing in the town. The population density was 1,107.6 inhabitants per square mile (427.6/km^{2}). There were 147 housing units at an average density of 609.8 per square mile (235.4/km^{2}). The racial makeup of the town was 93.26% White, 2.25% African American, 3.37% Asian, 1.12% from other races. Hispanic or Latino of any race were 0.75% of the population.

There were 125 households, out of which 19.2% had children under the age of 18 living with them, 44.0% were married couples living together, 8.8% had a female householder with no husband present, and 43.2% were non-families. 41.6% of all households were made up of individuals, and 21.6% had someone living alone who was 65 years of age or older. The average household size was 2.14 and the average family size was 2.94.

In the town, the population was spread out, with 21.3% under the age of 18, 6.7% from 18 to 24, 24.3% from 25 to 44, 25.5% from 45 to 64, and 22.1% who were 65 years of age or older. The median age was 42 years. For every 100 females, there were 92.1 males. For every 100 females age 18 and over, there were 100.0 males.

The median income for a household in the town was $25,625, and the median income for a family was $36,125. Males had a median income of $29,167 versus $20,833 for females. The per capita income for the town was $11,663. About 14.5% of families and 17.9% of the population were below the poverty line, including 7.7% of those under the age of eighteen and 13.6% of those 65 or over.
