= Pauline, South Carolina =

Pauline
- Census-designated place
- Location within the state of South Carolina
- Coordinates: 34°49′52″N 81°52′23″W
- Country: United States
- State: South Carolina
- County: Spartanburg

Area
  - Total: 1.44 sq mi (3.73 km^{2})
  - Land: 1.43 sq mi (3.70 km^{2})
  - Water: 0.012 sq mi (0.03 km^{2})
- Elevation: 771 ft (235 m)

Population (2020)
  - Total: 209
  - Density: 146.5/sq mi (56.56/km^{2})
- Time zone: UTC-5 (Eastern (EST))
  - Summer (DST): UTC-4 (EDT)
- ZIP codes: 29374
- FIPS code: 45-54970
- GNIS feature ID: 2812989

Pauline is an unincorporated community and census-designated place (CDP) in Spartanburg County, South Carolina, United States. It was first listed as a CDP in the 2020 census with a population of 209.

Until the 1890s, Pauline was known as Stribling. The community took the name "Pauline" when they were to name a post office and the name "Stribling" was already taken; "Pauline" was the first name of the postmaster's daughter at the time.

Pauline has a post office with the zip code 29374.

The William Dixon Fowler House was listed on the National Register of Historic Places in 2012.

== Education ==
It is in Spartanburg County School District 6.

== Demographics ==
Historical population
Census	Pop.	Note	%±
2020	209		—
U.S. Decennial Census; 2020

Pauline first appeared as a census designated place in the 2020 U.S. census.

=== Racial and ethnic composition ===
Pauline CDP, South Carolina – Racial and ethnic composition Note: the US Census treats Hispanic/Latino as an ethnic category. This table excludes Latinos from the racial categories and assigns them to a separate category. Hispanics/Latinos may be of any race.
Race / Ethnicity (NH = Non-Hispanic)	Pop 2020	2020
White alone (NH)	155	74.16%
Black or African American alone (NH)	18	8.61%
Native American or Alaska Native alone (NH)	1	0.48%
Asian alone (NH)	0	0.00%
Native Hawaiian or Pacific Islander alone (NH)	0	0.00%
Other race alone (NH)	1	0.48%
Mixed race or Multiracial (NH)	16	7.66%
Hispanic or Latino (any race)	18	8.61%
Total	209	100.00%
