= Ben Avon, South Carolina =

- Census-designated place
- Location within South Carolina Location within the United States
- Coordinates: 34°55′58″N 81°52′22″W
- Country: United States
- State: South Carolina
- County: Spartanburg

Area
  - Total: 1.68 sq mi (4.35 km^{2})
  - Land: 1.67 sq mi (4.33 km^{2})
  - Water: 0.0077 sq mi (0.02 km^{2})
- Elevation: 728 ft (222 m)

Population (2020)
  - Total: 2,428
  - Density: 1,453.3/sq mi (561.13/km^{2})
- Time zone: UTC-5 (Eastern (EST))
  - Summer (DST): UTC-4 (EDT)
- ZIP Code: 29302 (Spartanburg)
- Area codes: 864, 821
- FIPS code: 45-05545
- GNIS feature ID: 2807091

Ben Avon is an unincorporated area and census-designated place (CDP) adjacent to the city of Spartanburg in Spartanburg County, South Carolina, United States. It was first listed as a CDP prior to the 2020 census. The population as of 2020 was 2,428.

The CDP is in eastern Spartanburg County and is bordered to the northwest by the city of Spartanburg. It is bordered to the south by unincorporated Camp Croft.

U.S. Route 176 (South Pine Street) is the main road through the community, leading northwest 3 miles (5 km) to the center of Spartanburg and southeast 22 miles (35 km) to Union. South Carolina Highway 9 runs with US 176 along South Pine Street but leads east-southeast 45 miles (72 km) to Chester. The W Line of the Norfolk Southern Railway forms the southern border of the CDP.

== Demographics ==
Historical population
| Census | Pop. | Note | %± |
|---|---|---|---|
| 2020 | 2,428 | | — |
U.S. Decennial Census; 2020

Ben Avon first appeared as a census designated place in the 2020 U.S. census.

=== 2020 census ===
Ben Avon CDP, South Carolina – Demographic Profile (NH = Non-Hispanic)
| Race / Ethnicity | Pop 2020 | % 2020 |
|---|---|---|
| White alone (NH) | 1,492 | 61.45% |
| Black or African American alone (NH) | 721 | 29.70% |
| Native American or Alaska Native alone (NH) | 4 | 0.16% |
| Asian alone (NH) | 55 | 2.27% |
| Pacific Islander alone (NH) | 0 | 0.00% |
| Some Other Race alone (NH) | 6 | 0.25% |
| Mixed Race/Multi-Racial (NH) | 77 | 3.17% |
| Hispanic or Latino (any race) | 73 | 3.01% |
| Total | 2,428 | 100.00% |

Note: the US Census treats Hispanic/Latino as an ethnic category. This table excludes Latinos from the racial categories and assigns them to a separate category. Hispanics/Latinos can be of any race.

== Education ==
It is in the Spartanburg School District 7.
