= Chapman High School (Inman, South Carolina) =

Public high school in South Carolina, US

Coordinates: 35°3′48″N 82°6′0″W

Location
- 1420 Compton Bridge Rd, Inman, SC 29349

Information
- Founded: 1954
- Principal: Matthew Davis
- Teaching staff: 77.25 (FTE)
- Enrollment: 1,068 (2023-2024)
- Student to teacher ratio: 13.83
- Colors: Navy and orange
- Mascot: Panther

Chapman High School is a public high school located in Inman, South Carolina, United States. It is a part of Spartanburg County School District 1.

The school was founded in 1954. The current principal is Matthew Davis, former assistant principal at Chapman High School. The graduation rate is 94%, above the 2021 state average of 83.3%.

== History ==
Chapman High School was built as the successor to Inman High School due to increasing population. The original mascot, the "Purple Treadway" used in the early years of the school's establishment in 1954.

An updated campus was opened in 2006, leaving the previous building for its main influx institution, Mabry Middle School, to expand.

In 2007, the football team made it to the 2A State Championship for the first time. They finished 12–3 in 2007. They were Region-II 2A Champs (6-0) and 2A Upper State Champions. In 2016, Chapman finished 12–3, making it to the 3-A State Championship and defeating Dillon 29-27 for their first South Carolina State Championship. In 2017, they went 14-1 (3A Upper State Champs) with their only loss coming in the South Carolina State Championship against Dillon. In 2019, the Chapman Panthers went 15–0, becoming one of two undefeated teams in South Carolina. The Chapman Panthers defeated the Dillon Wildcats 44–14 in their 3rd appearance in the 3-A South Carolina State Championship and their 2nd 3-A South Carolina State Championship.

It also had 3 students accepted to SC Governor's School of Arts and Humanities in 2003. SCGSAH is a public high school that allows high school students expressing interest in making arts into a career earn an associate degree while earning their high school diploma. It's located in Greenville, SC. Timothy Giles who majored in Theatre; Kristen Pack who went on full scholarship and majored in creative writing. She also received the Scholastic Silver Key for her short non-fiction story called Carolina Koolaid. Corey Wallace was accepted the following year into the Creative Writing Program.

== Programs ==
Chapman High School is a member of the National Beta Club.

=== Athletics ===
Chapman High School offers the following athletics:

Fall Sports at Chapman High School
Boys	Girls	Co-Ed
Cross Country	Cross Country	Cheerleading
Football	Golf	
	Tennis	
	Volleyball	

Winter Sports at Chapman High School
Boys	Girls
Basketball	Basketball
Wrestling	Wrestling

Spring Sports at Chapman High School
Boys	Girls
Baseball	Soccer
Golf	Softball
Soccer	Track and Field
Tennis	
Track and Field	

== Notable alumni ==
- Fieldin Culbreth, an umpire in Major League Baseball
- Deebo Samuel, a player in the National Football League

== See also ==
- List of high schools in South Carolina
- Spartanburg County School District 1
