= Valley Falls, South Carolina =

- CDP
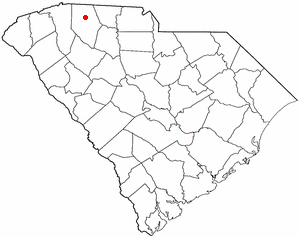
- Location of Valley Falls, South Carolina
- Coordinates: 35°00′06″N 81°58′45″W
- Country: United States
- State: South Carolina
- County: Spartanburg

Area
  - Total: 5.22 sq mi (13.51 km^{2})
  - Land: 5.19 sq mi (13.43 km^{2})
  - Water: 0.031 sq mi (0.08 km^{2})
- Elevation: 781 ft (238 m)

Population (2020)
  - Total: 8,012
  - Density: 1,544.7/sq mi (596.43/km^{2})
- Time zone: UTC-5 (Eastern (EST))
  - Summer (DST): UTC-4 (EDT)
- FIPS code: 45-73465
- GNIS feature ID: 2402956

Valley Falls is a census-designated place (CDP) in Spartanburg County, South Carolina, United States. The population was 6,299 at the 2010 census.

== Geography ==
According to the United States Census Bureau, the CDP has a total area of 5.2 square miles (13 km^{2}), of which 0.04 square miles (0.10 km^{2}), or 0.57%, is water.

== Demographics ==
Historical population
Census	Pop.	Note	%±
2000	3,990		—
2010	6,299		57.9%
2020	8,012		27.2%
U.S. Decennial Census

=== 2020 census ===
Valley Falls racial composition
Race	Num.	Perc.
White (non-Hispanic)	4,658	58.14%
Black or African American (non-Hispanic)	1,838	22.94%
Native American	10	0.12%
Asian	302	3.77%
Other/Mixed	339	4.23%
Hispanic or Latino	865	10.8%

As of the 2020 United States census, there were 8,012 people, 2,648 households, and 1,201 families residing in the CDP.

=== 2000 census ===
At the 2000 census there were 3,990 people, 1,508 households, and 883 families in the CDP. The population density was 767.9 inhabitants per square mile (296.5/km^{2}). There were 1,694 housing units at an average density of 326.0 per square mile (125.9/km^{2}). The racial makeup of the CDP was 82.41% White, 13.63% African American, 0.28% Native American, 2.66% Asian, 0.05% Pacific Islander, 0.35% from other races, and 0.63% from two or more races. Hispanic or Latino of any race were 1.60%.

Of the 1,508 households 24.9% had children under the age of 18 living with them, 45.8% were married couples living together, 8.8% had a female householder with no husband present, and 41.4% were non-families. 29.7% of households were one person and 6.2% were one person aged 65 or older. The average household size was 2.34 and the average family size was 2.90.

The age distribution was 17.7% under the age of 18, 24.2% from 18 to 24, 26.9% from 25 to 44, 20.7% from 45 to 64, and 10.6% 65 or older. The median age was 30 years. For every 100 females, there were 88.1 males. For every 100 females age 18 and over, there were 83.4 males.

The median household income was $33,636 and the median family income was $41,101. Males had a median income of $32,051 versus $26,483 for females. The per capita income for the CDP was $17,162. About 3.1% of families and 7.3% of the population were below the poverty line, including 1.2% of those under age 18 and 8.7% of those age 65 or over.

== Education ==
It is mostly in Spartanburg County School District 2, with a portion in Spartanburg County School District 6.

University of South Carolina Upstate is in Valley Falls.
