= Drayton, South Carolina =

Census-designated place in South Carolina, United States

Drayton
- Census-designated place
- Interactive map of Drayton
- Coordinates: 34°58′04″N 81°54′23″W
- Country: United States
- State: South Carolina
- County: Spartanburg

Area
  - Total: 1.40 sq mi (3.63 km^{2})
  - Land: 1.40 sq mi (3.63 km^{2})
  - Water: 0 sq mi (0.00 km^{2})
- Elevation: 742 ft (226 m)

Population (2020)
  - Total: 1,115
  - Density: 795.1/sq mi (306.99/km^{2})
- Time zone: UTC-5 (Eastern (EST))
  - Summer (DST): UTC-4 (EDT)
- FIPS code: 45-20590
- GNIS feature ID: 1231240

Drayton is an unincorporated community and census-designated place (CDP) in Spartanburg County, in the U.S. state of South Carolina. It was first listed as a CDP in the 2020 census with a population of 1,115.

== History ==
A post office called Drayton has been in operation since 1904. The community was named for William Henry Drayton (1742–1779), a South Carolina delegate to Continental Congress.

== Education ==
Spartanburg County School District 7 serves Drayton. It operates Spartanburg High School.

== Demographics ==
Historical population
Census	Pop.	Note	%±
2020	1,115		—
U.S. Decennial Census; 2020

Drayton first appeared as a census designated place in the 2020 U.S. census.

=== 2020 census ===
Drayton CDP, South Carolina – Demographic Profile (NH = Non-Hispanic)
Race / Ethnicity	Pop 2020	% 2020
White alone (NH)	770	69.06%
Black or African American alone (NH)	199	17.85%
Native American or Alaska Native alone (NH)	1	0.09%
Asian alone (NH)	21	1.88%
Pacific Islander alone (NH)	6	0.54%
Some Other Race alone (NH)	3	0.27%
Mixed Race/Multi-Racial (NH)	43	3.86%
Hispanic or Latino (any race)	72	6.46%
Total	1,115	100.00%

Note: the US Census treats Hispanic/Latino as an ethnic category. This table excludes Latinos from the racial categories and assigns them to a separate category. Hispanics/Latinos can be of any race.
