= Spartanburg County School District 1 =

School district in Spartanburg County, South Carolina

Spartanburg County School District One

Address
- 121 Wheeler Street Spartanburg County, South Carolina Campobello, South Carolina, 29322; United States
- Coordinates: 35°6′47.5″N 82°8′51.5″W

District information
- Type: Public
- Grades: Pre-K through 12
- Schools: Elementary 6, Middle 2, High 2
- Budget: $53,835,000
- NCES District ID: 4503480

Other information
- See Also: Spartanburg County School District 1; Spartanburg County School District 2; Spartanburg County School District 3; Spartanburg County School District 4; Spartanburg County School District 5; Spartanburg County School District 6; Spartanburg County School District 7
- Website: www.spart1.org

Spartanburg County School District 1 is a school district based in Campobello, South Carolina, U.S. It serves much of western Spartanburg County, including Campobello, Inman, and Landrum. Spartanburg County School District 1 has eleven schools. That includes six elementary schools, two middle schools, two high schools, and one career center.

== List of schools ==
=== Elementary schools ===
- Campobello-Gramling School
- New Prospect Elementary School
- O.P. Earle Elementary School
- Holly Springs-Motlow Elementary School
- Inman Elementary School
- Inman Intermediate School

=== Middle schools ===
- Landrum Middle School
- Mabry Middle School

=== High school ===
- Chapman High School
- Landrum High School

=== Career Center ===
- Swofford Career Center

=== Other ===
- Virtual School
- The Scholars Academy
