= Spartanburg County School District 3 =

School district in South Carolina, United States

Spartanburg County School District Three

Address
- 3535 Clifton Glendale Road Spartanburg County, South Carolina Glendale, South Carolina, 29346; United States

District information
- Type: Public
- Motto: Every Child, Every Day, Whatever it Takes
- Grades: Pre-K through 12
- Superintendent: Kenny Blackwood
- Schools: 7

Students and staff
- Students: 2,916

Other information
- See Also: Spartanburg County School District 1; Spartanburg County School District 2; Spartanburg County School District 3; Spartanburg County School District 4; Spartanburg County School District 5; Spartanburg County School District 6; Spartanburg County School District 7
- Website: www.spartanburg3.org

Spartanburg County School District 3 (SCSD3) is a public school district in Spartanburg County, South Carolina, United States. Led by superintendent Kenny Blackwood, the district operates seven schools and the Daniel Morgan Technology Center.

== List of schools ==
=== Elementary schools ===
- Cannons Elementary School
- Cowpens Elementary School
- Pacolet Elementary School

=== Middle and junior high schools ===
Clifdale Middle School

=== High schools ===
- Gettys D. Broome High School
