= Campobello, South Carolina =

- Town
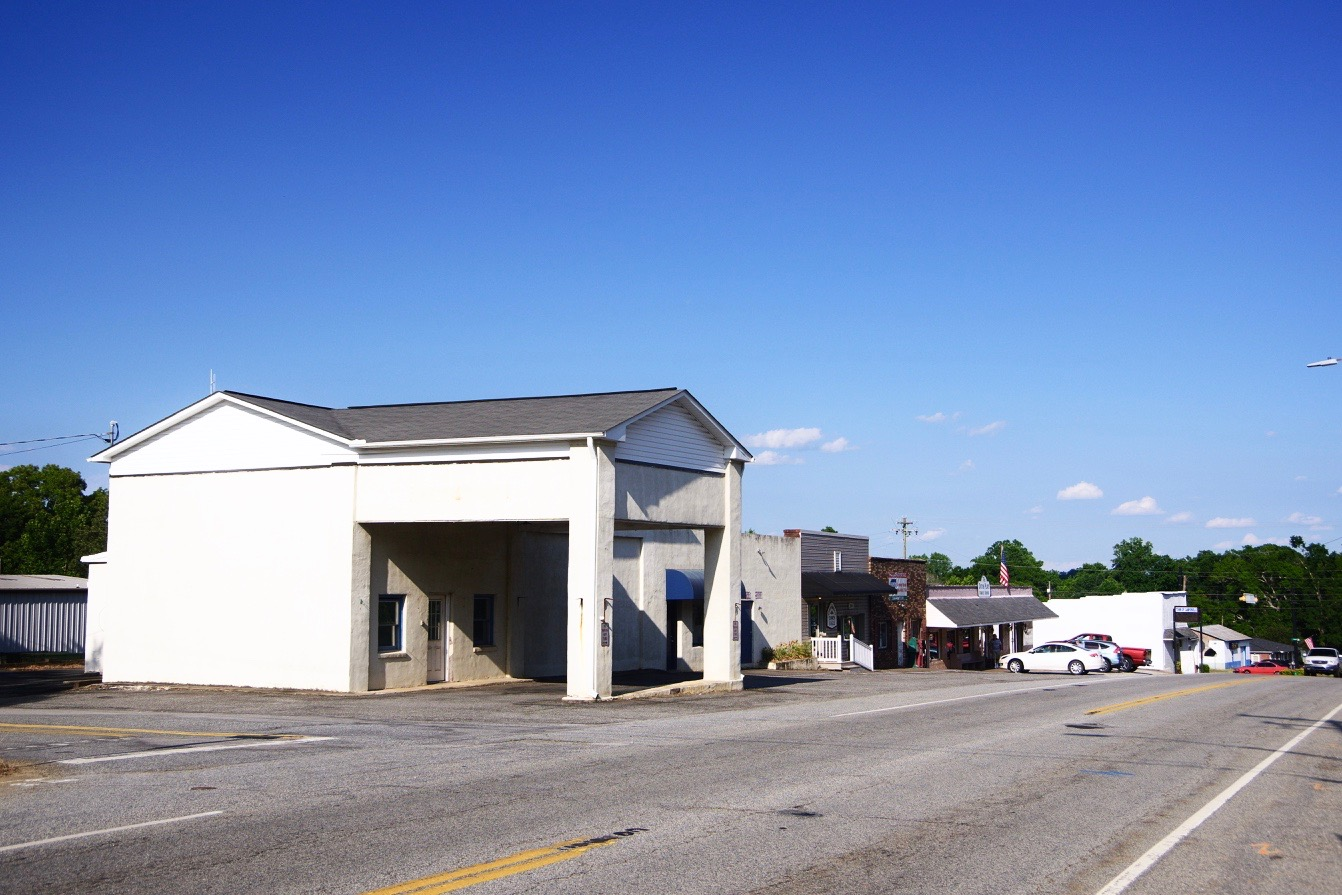
- Main Street (US 176)

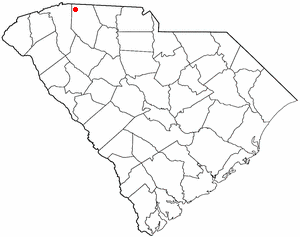
- Location of Campobello, South Carolina
- Coordinates: 35°07′32″N 82°08′40″W
- Country: United States
- State: South Carolina
- County: Spartanburg

Area
  - Total: 2.78 sq mi (7.21 km^{2})
  - Land: 2.78 sq mi (7.21 km^{2})
  - Water: 0 sq mi (0.00 km^{2})
- Elevation: 866 ft (264 m)

Population (2020)
  - Total: 675
  - Density: 242.6/sq mi (93.68/km^{2})
- Time zone: UTC-5 (Eastern (EST))
  - Summer (DST): UTC-4 (EDT)
- ZIP code: 29322
- Area codes: 864, 821
- FIPS code: 45-11125
- GNIS feature ID: 2405372
- Website: Town website

Campobello is a town in Spartanburg County, South Carolina, United States, along the South Pacolet River. As of the 2020 census, Campobello had a population of 675.

== History ==
Campobello was founded in 1840. Campobello is a name derived from Italian meaning "beautiful field". A post office called Campobello has been in operation since 1850.

== Geography ==
Campobello is concentrated around the intersection of U.S. Route 176 and South Carolina Highway 357, northwest of Spartanburg, and a few miles south of the North Carolina-South Carolina border. South Carolina Highway 11 passes through the northern part of Campobello, connecting the town with Interstate 26 to the east.

According to the United States Census Bureau, the town has a total area of 0.9 square miles (2.3 km^{2}), all land.

== Demographics ==
Historical population
Census	Pop.	Note	%±
1880	99		—
1890	137		38.4%
1900	203		48.2%
1910	255		25.6%
1920	309		21.2%
1930	340		10.0%
1940	389		14.4%
1950	394		1.3%
1960	420		6.6%
1970	530		26.2%
1980	472		−10.9%
1990	465		−1.5%
2000	449		−3.4%
2010	502		11.8%
2020	675		34.5%
U.S. Decennial Census

=== 2020 census ===
Campobello racial composition
Race	Num.	Perc.
White (non-Hispanic)	561	83.11%
Black or African American (non-Hispanic)	25	3.7%
Native American	1	0.15%
Asian	16	2.37%
Other/Mixed	37	5.48%
Hispanic or Latino	35	5.19%

As of the 2020 United States census, there were 675 people, 208 households, and 145 families residing in the town.

=== 2000 census ===
As of the census of 2000, there were 449 people, 160 households, and 124 families residing in the town. The population density was 520.8 inhabitants per square mile (201.1/km^{2}). There were 176 housing units at an average density of 204.1 per square mile (78.8/km^{2}). The racial makeup of the town was 85.97% White, 8.69% African American, 0.45% Native American, 4.01% Asian, and 0.89% from two or more races. Hispanic or Latino of any race were 0.89% of the population.

There were 160 households, out of which 33.8% had children under the age of 18 living with them, 61.3% were married couples living together, 15.0% had a female householder with no husband present, and 22.5% were non-families. 18.8% of all households were made up of individuals, and 11.3% had someone living alone who was 65 years of age or older. The average household size was 2.76 and the average family size was 3.18.

In the town, the population was spread out, with 25.8% under the age of 18, 8.2% from 18 to 24, 25.4% from 25 to 44, 26.9% from 45 to 64, and 13.6% who were 65 years of age or older. The median age was 40 years. For every 100 females, there were 91.1 males. For every 100 females age 18 and over, there were 88.1 males.

The median income for a household in the town was $36,250, and the median income for a family was $41,250. Males had a median income of $29,500 versus $21,875 for females. The per capita income for the town was $15,904. About 3.1% of families and 5.2% of the population were below the poverty line, including 8.5% of those under age 18 and 8.1% of those age 65 or over.

== Education ==
It is in the Spartanburg School District 1.
