= Hilltop, South Carolina =

- Census-designated place
- Location within South Carolina Location within the United States
- Coordinates: 34°58′28″N 81°57′28″W
- Country: United States
- State: South Carolina
- County: Spartanburg

Area
  - Total: 1.83 sq mi (4.73 km^{2})
  - Land: 1.83 sq mi (4.73 km^{2})
  - Water: 0 sq mi (0.00 km^{2})
- Elevation: 876 ft (267 m)

Population (2020)
  - Total: 3,273
  - Density: 1,793.5/sq mi (692.49/km^{2})
- Time zone: UTC-5 (Eastern (EST))
  - Summer (DST): UTC-4 (EDT)
- ZIP Code: 29303 (Spartanburg)
- Area codes: 864, 821
- FIPS code: 45-33977
- GNIS feature ID: 2812990

Hilltop is an unincorporated area and census-designated place (CDP) adjacent to the city of Spartanburg in Spartanburg County, South Carolina, United States. It was first listed as a CDP prior to the 2020 census with a population of 3,273.

== Geography ==
Hilltop is in central Spartanburg County and is bordered to the southeast by the city of Spartanburg. Interstate 585 forms the northeast border of the CDP, Interstate 85 Business is the northwest border, and the southwest border is a branch of the Norfolk Southern Railway. The CDP of Southern Shops is to the northwest, across I-85 Business, and Saxon is to the southwest, across the railroad.

South Carolina Highway 56 (Asheville Highway) is the main road through Hilltop, leading southeast into Spartanburg and northwest 9 miles (14 km) to Inman.

== Demographics ==
Historical population
Census	Pop.	Note	%±
2020	3,273		—
U.S. Decennial Census; 2020

Hilltop first appeared as a census designated place in the 2020 U.S. census.

=== 2020 census ===
As of the 2020 census, Hilltop had a population of 3,273. The median age was 38.5 years. 16.5% of residents were under the age of 18, and 15.6% were 65 years of age or older. For every 100 females there were 118.5 males, and for every 100 females age 18 and over there were 118.1 males age 18 and over.

There were 1,100 households, of which 27.6% had children under the age of 18 living in them. Of all households, 29.4% were married-couple households, 22.0% were households with a male householder and no spouse or partner present, and 39.7% were households with a female householder and no spouse or partner present. About 32.5% of all households were made up of individuals, and 10.8% had someone living alone who was 65 years of age or older.

There were 1,257 housing units, of which 12.5% were vacant. The homeowner vacancy rate was 4.0% and the rental vacancy rate was 12.9%. 100.0% of residents lived in urban areas, while 0.0% lived in rural areas.

Hilltop CDP, South Carolina – Demographic Profile (NH = Non-Hispanic)
Race / Ethnicity	Pop 2020	% 2020
White alone (NH)	1,195	36.51%
Black or African American alone (NH)	1,307	39.93%
Native American or Alaska Native alone (NH)	8	0.24%
Asian alone (NH)	127	3.88%
Pacific Islander alone (NH)	1	0.03%
Some Other Race alone (NH)	7	0.21%
Mixed Race/Multi-Racial (NH)	93	2.84%
Hispanic or Latino (any race)	535	16.35%
Total	3,273	100.00%

Note: the US Census treats Hispanic/Latino as an ethnic category. This table excludes Latinos from the racial categories and assigns them to a separate category. Hispanics/Latinos can be of any race.
