= Saxon, South Carolina =

- CDP
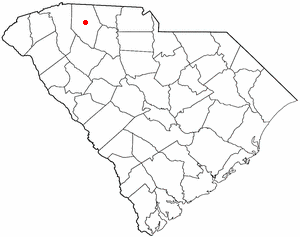
- Location of Saxon, South Carolina

- Location within South Carolina Location within the United States
- Coordinates: 34°57′42″N 81°58′17″W
- Country: United States
- State: South Carolina
- County: Spartanburg

Area
  - Total: 2.39 sq mi (6.18 km^{2})
  - Land: 2.38 sq mi (6.17 km^{2})
  - Water: 0.0039 sq mi (0.01 km^{2})
- Elevation: 837 ft (255 m)

Population (2020)
  - Total: 3,896
  - Density: 1,636.3/sq mi (631.79/km^{2})
- Time zone: UTC-5 (Eastern (EST))
  - Summer (DST): UTC-4 (EDT)
- FIPS code: 45-64240
- GNIS feature ID: 2402828

Saxon is a census-designated place (CDP) in Spartanburg County, South Carolina, United States. The population was 3,424 at the 2010 census.

== Geography ==
According to the United States Census Bureau, the CDP has a total area of 2.4 square miles (6.2 km^{2}), all land.

== Demographics ==
Historical population
Census	Pop.	Note	%±
2000	3,707		—
2010	3,424		−7.6%
2020	3,896		13.8%
U.S. Decennial Census

=== 2020 census ===
As of the 2020 census, Saxon had a population of 3,896. The median age was 29.5 years. 24.1% of residents were under the age of 18 and 10.9% of residents were 65 years of age or older. For every 100 females there were 93.8 males, and for every 100 females age 18 and over there were 90.7 males age 18 and over.

100.0% of residents lived in urban areas, while 0.0% lived in rural areas.

There were 1,295 households in Saxon, of which 33.2% had children under the age of 18 living in them. Of all households, 24.9% were married-couple households, 24.0% were households with a male householder and no spouse or partner present, and 42.2% were households with a female householder and no spouse or partner present. About 30.0% of all households were made up of individuals and 10.2% had someone living alone who was 65 years of age or older.

There were 1,554 housing units, of which 16.7% were vacant. The homeowner vacancy rate was 1.9% and the rental vacancy rate was 9.7%.

Racial composition as of the 2020 census
Race	Number	Percent
White	1,263	32.4%
Black or African American	1,658	42.6%
American Indian and Alaska Native	44	1.1%
Asian	13	0.3%
Native Hawaiian and Other Pacific Islander	1	0.0%
Some other race	673	17.3%
Two or more races	244	6.3%
Hispanic or Latino (of any race)	955	24.5%

=== 2000 census ===
As of the census of 2000, there were 3,707 people, 1,294 households, and 854 families residing in the CDP. The population density was 1,566.8 inhabitants per square mile (604.9/km^{2}). There were 1,587 housing units at an average density of 670.8 per square mile (259.0/km^{2}). The racial makeup of the CDP was 58.27% White, 32.26% African American, 0.27% Native American, 0.65% Asian, 0.03% Pacific Islander, 6.15% from other races, and 2.37% from two or more races. Hispanic or Latino of any race were 12.19% of the population.

There were 1,294 households, out of which 26.1% had children under the age of 18 living with them, 38.8% were married couples living together, 18.6% had a female householder with no husband present, and 34.0% were non-families. 27.7% of all households were made up of individuals, and 9.4% had someone living alone who was 65 years of age or older. The average household size was 2.65 and the average family size was 3.17.

In the CDP, the population was spread out, with 22.7% under the age of 18, 17.5% from 18 to 24, 26.7% from 25 to 44, 22.0% from 45 to 64, and 11.1% who were 65 years of age or older. The median age was 32 years. For every 100 females, there were 107.8 males. For every 100 females age 18 and over, there were 108.1 males.

The median income for a household in the CDP was $22,381, and the median income for a family was $26,118. Males had a median income of $22,099 versus $20,139 for females. The per capita income for the CDP was $11,887. About 18.3% of families and 23.2% of the population were below the poverty line, including 24.3% of those under age 18 and 25.8% of those age 65 or over.

== Education ==
Most of the area is in Spartanburg County School District 6 while a very small portion is in Spartanburg County School District 7. The latter operates Spartanburg High School.

Spartanburg Methodist College is in Saxon.

== Notable person ==
- William Westmoreland, U.S. Army Chief of Staff from 1968 to 1972
