= List of highways numbered 77 =

Route 77, or Highway 77, may refer to:

== International ==
- AH77 Asian Highway 77
- E77 European route E77

== Afghanistan ==
- Kabul-Herat Highway (A77)

== Australia ==
- Bowen Developmental Road – Queensland State Route 77

== Canada ==
- British Columbia Highway 77
- Manitoba Highway 77
- Ontario Highway 77

== Finland ==
- Finnish national road 77

== Greece ==
- EO77 road

== India ==
- National Highway 77 (India)

== Iran ==
- Road 77

== Israel ==
- Highway 77 (Israel)

== Malaysia ==
- Malaysia Federal Route 77

== Korea, South ==
- National Route 77

== New Zealand ==
- New Zealand State Highway 77

== Philippines ==
- N77 highway (Philippines)

== United Arab Emirates ==
- E 77, also known as the Dubai-Al Habab Road

== United States ==
- Interstate 77
- U.S. Route 77
- Alabama State Route 77
- Arizona State Route 77
- Arkansas Highway 77
- California State Route 77
- Connecticut Route 77
- Florida State Road 77
- Georgia State Route 77
- Idaho State Highway 77
- Illinois Route 77 (former)
- Iowa Highway 77 (former)
- Kentucky Route 77
- Louisiana Highway 77
- Maine State Route 77
- Maryland Route 77
- M-77 (Michigan highway)
- Minnesota State Highway 77
- Missouri Route 77
  - Missouri Route 77 (1929) (former)
- Montana Highway 77
- Nebraska Highway 77 (former)
  - Nebraska Highway 77B (former)
- Nevada State Route 77 (former)
- New Hampshire Route 77
- New Jersey Route 77
  - County Route 77 (Bergen County, New Jersey)
  - County Route 77 (Ocean County, New Jersey)
- New Mexico State Road 77
- New York State Route 77
  - County Route 77 (Cattaraugus County, New York)
  - County Route 77 (Chautauqua County, New York)
  - County Route 77 (Dutchess County, New York)
  - County Route 77 (Jefferson County, New York)
  - County Route 77 (Madison County, New York)
  - County Route 77 (Montgomery County, New York)
  - County Route 77 (Niagara County, New York)
  - County Route 77 (Onondaga County, New York)
  - County Route 77 (Orange County, New York)
  - County Route 77 (Rensselaer County, New York)
  - County Route 77 (Suffolk County, New York)
    - County Route 77B (Suffolk County, New York)
  - County Route 77 (Ulster County, New York)
  - County Route 77 (Washington County, New York)
- North Carolina Highway 77
- Ohio State Route 77 (1923) (former)
- Oklahoma State Highway 77 (former)
  - Oklahoma State Highway 77C (former and current highway)
  - Oklahoma State Highway 77D
  - Oklahoma State Highway 77H
  - Oklahoma State Highway 77S
- Pennsylvania Route 77
- Rhode Island Route 77
- Tennessee State Route 77
- Texas State Highway 77
  - Texas State Highway Loop 77 (former)
  - Texas State Highway Spur 77
  - Farm to Market Road 77 (Texas)
- Utah State Route 77
- Virginia State Route 77 (former)
- West Virginia Route 77 (1920s) (former)
- Wisconsin Highway 77
- Wyoming Highway 77

== See also ==
- List of highways numbered 77A
- A77

Preceded by 76	Lists of highways 77	Succeeded by 78
