= Route 76 (disambiguation) =

Route 76 may refer to:

- London Buses route 76
- National Cycle Route 76, cycle route in the United Kingdom
- California State Route 76

== See also ==
- List of highways numbered 76
