= List of highways numbered 76 =

Route 76 or Highway 76 may refer to:

== International ==
- AH76 Asian Highway 76
- E76 European route E76

== Afghanistan ==
- Kabul-Mazar Highway (A76)

== Australia ==
- Gwydir Highway

== China ==
- G76 Expressway

== Greece ==
- EO76 road

== Korea, South ==
- National Route 76

== Mexico ==
- Mexican Federal Highway 76

== Netherlands ==
- Rijksweg A76

== New Zealand ==
- New Zealand State Highway 76

== Philippines ==
- N76 highway (Philippines)

== United States ==
- Interstate 76
- U.S. Route 76
- Alabama State Route 76
  - County Route 76 (Lee County, Alabama)
- Arizona State Route 76 (former)
- Arkansas Highway 76
  - Arkansas Highway 76 (1926) (former)
- California State Route 76
- Colorado State Highway 76 (1923–1976) (former)
- Florida State Road 76
  - County Road 76A (Martin County, Florida)
- Georgia State Route 76
- Hawaii Route 76
- Illinois Route 76
- Iowa Highway 76
- K-76 (Kansas highway)
- Kentucky Route 76
- Louisiana Highway 76
  - Louisiana State Route 76 (former)
- Maryland Route 76
- M-76 (Michigan highway) (former)
- Minnesota State Highway 76
- Mississippi Highway 76
- Missouri Route 76
- Nebraska Highway 76 (former)
  - Nebraska Link 76E
  - Nebraska Spur 76A
  - Nebraska Spur 76C
  - Nebraska Spur 76D
- Nevada State Route 76 (former)
- New Jersey Route 76 (former)
  - New Jersey Route 76C
  - County Route 76 (Bergen County, New Jersey)
- New Mexico State Road 76
- New York State Route 76
  - County Route 76 (Cattaraugus County, New York)
  - County Route 76A (Cayuga County, New York)
  - County Route 76 (Madison County, New York)
  - County Route 76 (Montgomery County, New York)
  - County Route 76 (Niagara County, New York)
  - County Route 76 (Oneida County, New York)
  - County Route 76 (Orange County, New York)
  - County Route 76 (Rensselaer County, New York)
  - County Route 76 (Rockland County, New York)
  - County Route 76 (Saratoga County, New York)
  - County Route 76 (Steuben County, New York)
  - County Route 76 (Suffolk County, New York)
- Ohio State Route 76 (1923-1960) (former)
- Oklahoma State Highway 76
- Pennsylvania Route 76 (former)
- Tennessee State Route 76
- Texas State Highway 76 (former; two highways)
  - Texas State Highway Loop 76
  - Farm to Market Road 76
  - Urban Road 76 (signed as Farm to Market Road 76)
  - Texas Park Road 76
- Utah State Route 76
- Virginia State Route 76
- West Virginia Route 76
- Wisconsin Highway 76
- Wyoming Highway 76

Territories

- U.S. Virgin Islands Highway 76

== See also ==
- A76 (disambiguation)

Preceded by 75	Lists of highways 76	Succeeded by 77
