= Route 77 (disambiguation) =

Route 77 may refer to:

- Route 77 (MTA Maryland), a bus route in Baltimore, Maryland and its suburbs
- Route 77 (MBTA), a bus route in Massachusetts
- London Buses route 77

== See also ==
- List of highways numbered 77
