= Gas tax holiday =

Failed U.S. proposal to temporarily suspend federal gasoline taxes in 2008

In United States politics, the gas tax holiday or the gas tax loophole was originally a 2008 proposal made by presidential contenders Arizona Senator John McCain and New York Senator Hillary Clinton to suspend the federal excise tax on gasoline from Memorial Day to Labor Day in the year 2008. Proponents argued that this could reduce the gas price at the pump by about 18.4 cents a gallon for regular unleaded gasoline and 24.4 cents a gallon for diesel. If it were done, it was estimated the gas tax holiday would save consumers roughly $30 over the three-month period it would be instated. However, Barack Obama and others argued that the oil companies would not significantly lower prices and would instead pocket most of the tax cut, effectively turning the cut into a tax loophole.

In 2022, President Joe Biden made a similar proposal amid a wave of inflation.

== Proponents ==
Presidential hopefuls John McCain and Hillary Clinton both championed this proposal. The two political opponents purported this to be a short-term fix for gas prices that were set to hit $4 a gallon in the summer of 2008. With economic woes topping the American peoples' list of concerns, this became a hotly debated issue in the 2008 U.S. Presidential Election.

== Critics ==
The proposal met criticism from many news sources, politicians, economists, and the Bush administration.

Economic theory is very clear that the incidence of a consumption tax (who is expected to pay the tax) is inconsequential. Even if it were to lower the cost paid by the consumer, it would just result in a spike in demand during the period it was in effect, with prices rising in response.

Barack Obama was perhaps the most visibly vocal critic of the measure. He and other critics of the proposal have exclaimed that the holiday would be nothing more than a "short-term, quick-fix" that would not solve the nation's current and long-term problems of high oil prices and foreign oil dependency. Critics have nearly unanimously denounced the scheme as nothing more than pandering for votes in the Indiana and North Carolina primaries.

As a result of fuel tax being collected from retailers and given the fixed supply and high gasoline demand, it is argued that it would be unlikely that retailers would pass those savings on to consumers at the pump. Furthermore, State highway officials claimed the move could eliminate nearly 300,000 jobs over the summer months due to almost $9 billion in lost revenue that would be incurred if some other source of income is not found. Hillary Clinton proposed levying a new tax on oil company profits to compensate for it. However, both the Clinton and McCain proposals would most likely never be passed due to the overwhelming opposition of congressional leaders.

== 2022 proposals ==
In January 2022, Florida governor Ron DeSantis proposed a $1 billion gas tax holiday to counter inflation. The proposed policy would have occurred between July 1, 2022, and November 30, 2022. The final legislation resulted instead in a one-month gas tax holiday for October 2022. Other states, including New York, Georgia, Connecticut and Maryland, have suspended state gasoline taxes in 2022.

In June 2022, President Joe Biden revived the idea of a federal gas tax holiday during a surge in inflation, including rising gasoline prices. However, there was enough opposition in Congress that the proposal appeared unlikely to gain enough votes to pass.

== See also ==
- Fuel taxes in the United States
