= Highway Trust Fund =

Transportation fund in the United States

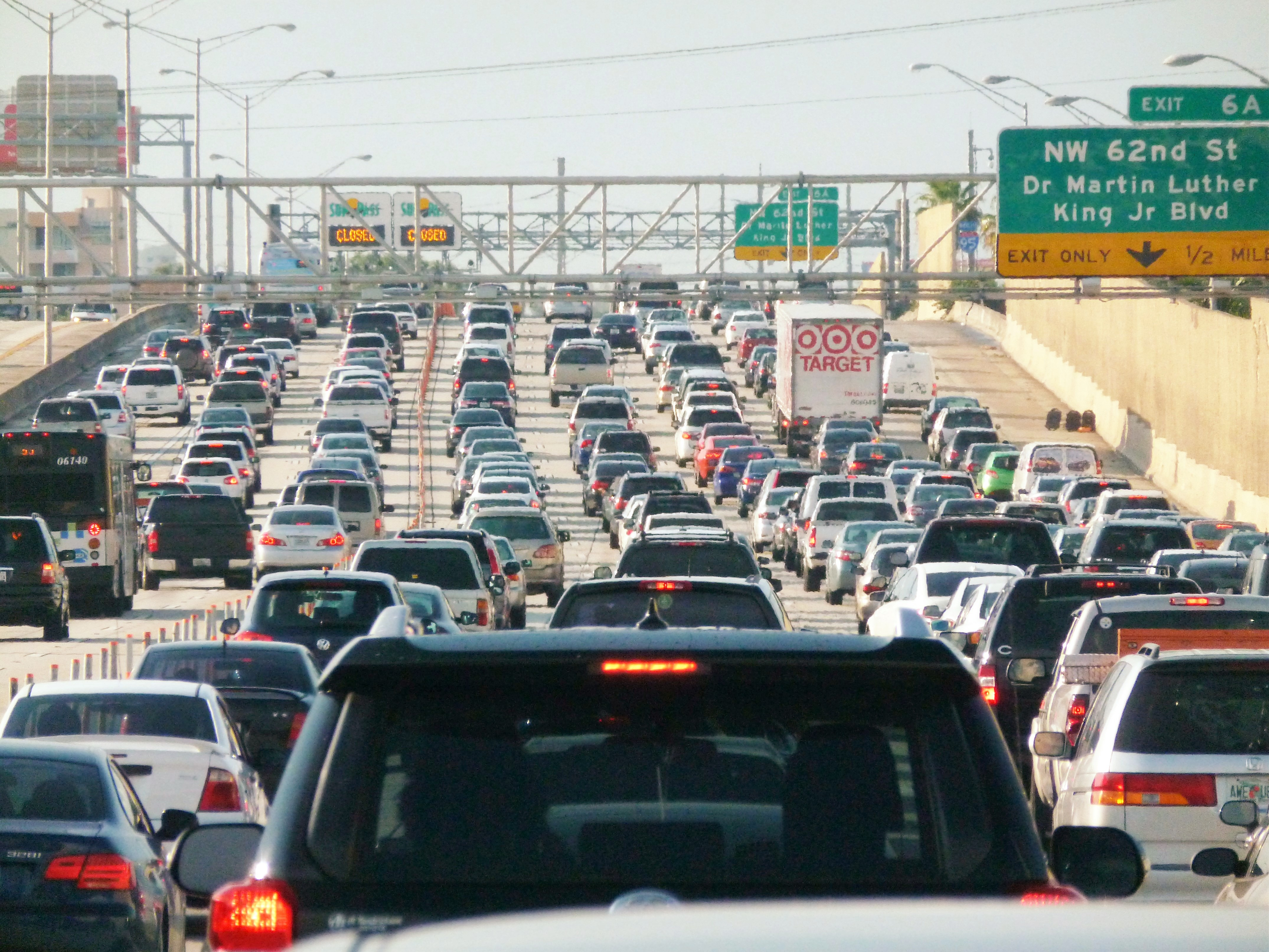
Between 2008 and 2023, insufficient revenues in the Highway Trust Fund led the federal government to spend $275 billion in general tax dollars to keep the system solvent.

The Highway Trust Fund is a transportation fund in the United States which receives money from a federal fuel tax of 18.3 cents per gallon on gasoline and 24.3 cents per gallon of diesel fuel and related excise taxes. It currently has two accounts, the Highway Account funding road construction and other surface transportation projects, and a smaller Mass Transit Account supporting mass transit. Separate from the Highway Trust Fund is the Leaking Underground Storage Tank Trust Fund, which receives an additional 0.1 cents per gallon on gasoline and diesel, making the total amount of tax collected 18.4 cents per gallon on gasoline and 24.4 cents per gallon on diesel fuel. The Highway Trust Fund was established in 1956 to finance the United States Interstate Highway System and certain other roads. The Mass Transit Account was created in 1982. The federal tax on motor fuels yielded $28.2 billion in 2006.

== History ==
Prior to the Federal Aid Highway Act of 1956 and the establishment of the Highway Trust Fund, roads were financed directly from the General Fund of the United States Department of the Treasury. The 1956 act directed federal fuel tax to the Treasury’s General Fund to be used exclusively for highway construction and maintenance. The Highway Revenue Act, pre-dating the Fund, mandated a tax of three cents per gallon. This original act, also known as Highway Revenue Act, was set to expire at the end of fiscal year 1972. In the late 1950s, the gas tax was increased to four cents. The 1982 Surface Transportation Assistance Act, approved by President Ronald Reagan in January 1983, increased the tax to nine cents with one cent going into a new Mass Transit Account to support public transport. In 1990, the gas tax was increased by President George H. W. Bush with the Omnibus Budget Reconciliation Act of 1990 to 14 cents, with 2.5 cents of the increase going to the Highway Fund. The other 2.5 cents of the Omnibus Act was directed towards deficit reduction. In 1993, President Clinton increased the gas tax to 18.4 cents with the Omnibus Budget Reconciliation Act of 1993 with all of the increase going towards deficit reduction. The Taxpayer Relief Act of 1997 redirected the 1993 increase to the newer Fund.

During 2008, the Fund required an additional $8 billion, which was provided by the Treasury’s general revenue funds to cover a shortage in the Fund. This shortage was due to lower gas consumption as a result of the recession and higher gas prices, together meaning an overall decrease in revenues that would otherwise have been directed to the Fund. Further transfers of $7 billion and an additional $19.5 billion were made in 2009 and 2010, respectively.

Since 2000, there have been at least half a dozen attempts by individual members of Congress to suspend the federal gas tax, without which (and without a replacement) would have halted efforts to repair and expand the Federal highway system. All such attempts have failed.

== Solvency issues ==
From 2008 to 2010, Congress authorized the transfer of $35 billion from the General Fund of the U.S. Treasury to keep the Trust Fund solvent. According to the Government Accountability Office, Congress has approved transfers of over $270 billion from the general fund to the trust fund from 2008 through 2021.

The Congressional Budget Office (CBO) projected in 2012 that the Fund's Highway Account and Mass Transit Account would become insolvent by 2014. CBO said that although vehicles would travel more miles in the future (therefore consuming more taxable fuel), congressional refusal to increase the fuel tax would have caused the Fund to receive less money. Further, CBO assumed that Congress would not increase transportation spending beyond inflation (adjusted from 2012).

As of June 2015, the CBO projected that payments from the Highway Trust Fund to the many states would need to be delayed at some point before the end of federal fiscal year 2015 (i.e., before the end of September 2015) to keep the balance above zero, without either some increase in the federal motor fuel excise tax (or allocation of other revenues to the Trust Fund). Alternatively, Congress would have had to reduce Trust Fund spending commitments.

In 2013, the U.S. Chamber of Commerce supported raising the federal gasoline tax to keep the Fund solvent.

The United States Congress passed a stopgap plan on July 31, 2014 to prevent a funding lapse.

As of 2015, despite a considerable drop in gas prices, there was still little support among the US public and Congress for any increase(s) of the gasoline excise tax.

== See also ==
- Fuel taxes in the United States
- United States energy law
