= A76 =

A76 or A-76 may refer to:

== Roads ==
- A76 motorway (Netherlands)
- A76 road, a road in Scotland
- A76 highway (Afghanistan), a road connecting Kabul and Mazar-i-Sharif
- Autovía A-76, a Spanish motorway

== Vessels ==
- RFA Tidepool, a tanker of Britain's Royal Navy
- INSV Mhadei (A76), a sail training boat of the Indian Navy

== Other ==
- Benoni Defense, in the Encyclopaedia of Chess Openings
- Button battery type LR1154 by the IEC standard
- Iceberg A-76, calved from the Filchner–Ronne Ice Shelf of Antarctica in May 2021
- ARM Cortex-A76, a computer processor microarchitecture
