= A77 =

A77 or A-77 may refer to:

== Roads ==
- A77 motorway (France)
- A77 motorway (Netherlands)
- A77 road (Scotland)
- Autovía A-77, a Spanish motorway
- Studer-Revox A77, a 1967 model of audio tape recorder manufactured by the Studer company under the Revox tradename

== Other uses ==
- American Airlines Flight 77, a plane that was hijacked and crashed into the Pentagon in the September 11 attacks
- Sony Alpha 77, camera made by Sony
- Teriflunomide (A77 1726), the active metabolite of leflunomide
- Benoni Defense in the Encyclopaedia of Chess Openings
