= List of highways numbered 77A =

The following highways are numbered 77A:

== United States ==
- County Road 77A (Bay County, Florida)
  - County Road 77A (Washington County, Florida)
- New York State Route 77A (former)
  - County Route 77A (Suffolk County, New York)
- Oklahoma State Highway 77A (former)
