= Fuel taxes in the United States =

Levies on hydrocarbons in the North American country

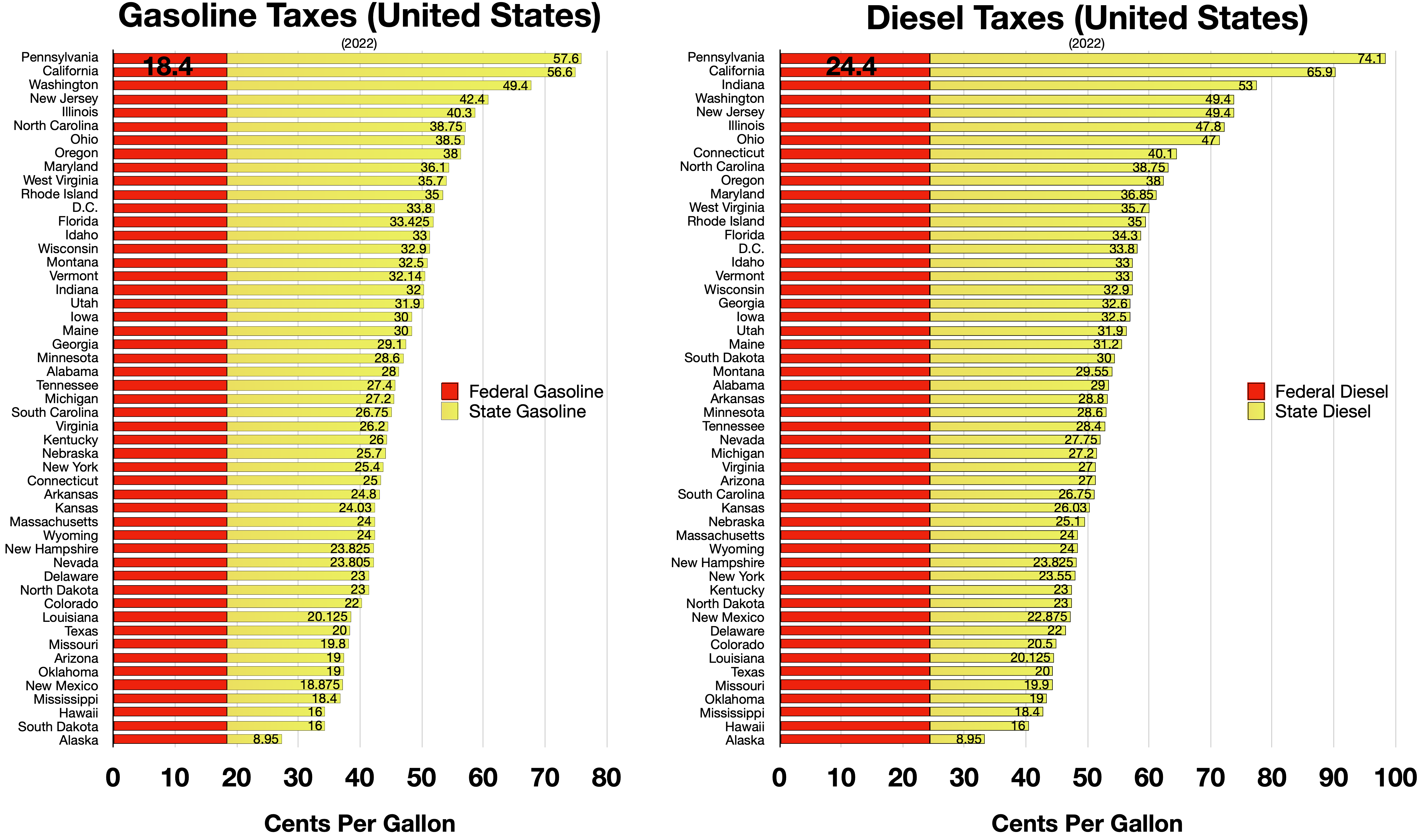
Fuel taxes (2022) Federal taxes State taxes

The United States federal excise tax on gasoline is 18.4 cents per gallon and 24.4 cents per gallon for diesel fuel. Proceeds from the tax partly support the Highway Trust Fund. The federal tax was last raised on October 1, 1993, and is not indexed to inflation, which increased 122% from October 1993 until November 2025. On average, as of April 2019, state and local taxes and fees add 34.24 cents to gasoline and 35.89 cents to diesel, for a total US volume-weighted average fuel tax of 52.64 cents per gallon for gas and 60.29 cents per gallon for diesel.

== State taxes ==
The first US state to tax fuel was Oregon, introduced on February 25, 1919. It was a 1¢/gal tax. In the following decade, all of the US states (48 at the time), along with the District of Columbia, introduced a gasoline tax. By 1939, many states levied an average fuel tax of 3.8¢/gal (1¢/L).

In the years since being created, state fuel taxes have undergone many revisions. While most fuel taxes were initially levied as a fixed number of cents per gallon, as of 2016, nineteen states and District of Columbia have fuel taxes with rates that vary alongside changes in the price of fuel, the inflation rate, vehicle fuel-economy, or other factors.

The table below includes state and local taxes and fees. The American Petroleum Institute uses a weighted average of local taxes by municipality population to create an average tax for the entire state. Similarly, the national average is weighted by the fuel volume sold in each state. Because many states with the highest taxes also have higher populations, more states (i.e., the less populated ones) have below-average taxes than above-average taxes.

Most states exempt gasoline from general sales taxes. However, several states collect full or partial sales tax in addition to the excise tax. Sales tax is not reflected in the rates below.

Taxes on gasoline and diesel for transportation by US state in US cents per gallon as of July 2025
State	Gasoline tax (¢/gal) (excludes federal tax of 18.4¢/gal)	Diesel tax (¢/gal) (excludes federal tax of 24.4¢/gal)	Notes
Alabama	31.00	32.75	
Alaska	8.95	8.95	
Arizona	19.00	27.00	
Arkansas	25.00	28.80	
California	70.92	87.32	Gasoline subject to 2.25% sales tax. Diesel subject to 9.25% sales tax.
Colorado	29.18	34.68	In Colorado Springs, Off-road Dyed Diesel and Gasoline are subject to a local city sales tax.
Connecticut	25.00	48.90	Subject to additional 8.1% sales tax
Delaware	23.00	22.00	
District of Columbia	35.30	35.30	
Florida	39.40	40.27	may also be subject to local option taxes of up to an additional 12 cents
Georgia	33.85	37.85	subject to local sales tax
Hawaii	18.50	18.50	also subject to county tax of 8.8-18.0 cents and additional sales tax
Idaho	33.00	33.00	
Illinois	66.40	73.90	Also subject to 6.25% state sales tax and varying local and municipal sales taxes. Interstate carriers are subject to interstate motor fuel use higher taxes.
Indiana	54.50	62.00	Indiana has two taxes on gasoline — a 7% sales tax (that is calculated monthly) and a tax directed to infrastructure projects.
Iowa	30.00	32.50	
Kansas	25.04	27.03	
Kentucky	26.40	23.40	
Louisiana	20.93	20.93	
Maine	31.40	31.87	
Maryland	46.19	46.94	
Massachusetts	27.47	27.47	
Michigan	48.20	49.90	subject to additional 6% sales tax
Minnesota	31.90	31.90	
Mississippi	21.40	21.40	
Missouri	29.99	29.99	
Montana	33.75	30.50	
Nebraska	32.70	32.10	
Nevada	23.81	27.75	also subject to additional local taxes
New Hampshire	23.83	23.83	
New Jersey	44.95	51.95	
New Mexico	18.88	22.88	
New York	24.87	23.07	subject to additional state sales tax of 4% (capped at $2.00/gal) and local sales tax (not capped), average combined sales taxes add roughly 20 cents
North Carolina	40.55	40.55	
North Dakota	23.03	23.03	
Ohio	38.50	47.00	
Oklahoma	20.00	20.00	
Oregon	40.00	40.00	additional local option of 1 to 5 cents
Pennsylvania	58.70	74.10	
Rhode Island	41.12	41.12	
South Carolina	28.75	28.75	
South Dakota	30.00	30.00	
Tennessee	27.40	28.40	
Texas	20.00	20.00	
Utah	39.15	39.15	
Vermont	31.39	33.00	
Virginia	41.60	42.70	
Washington	59.04	62.04	rates began July 1, 2025 and increase 2% annually.
West Virginia	35.70	35.70	
Wisconsin	32.90	32.90	
Wyoming	24.00	24.00	

== Federal taxes ==
The first federal gasoline tax in the United States was created on June 6, 1932, with the enactment of the Revenue Act of 1932, which taxed 1¢/gal (0.3¢/L). Since 1993, the US federal gasoline tax has been unchanged (and not adjusted for inflation of nearly 113 percent through 2023) at 18.4¢/gal (4.86¢/L). Unlike most other goods in the US, the price advertised (e.g., on pumps and stations' signs) includes all taxes, as opposed to inclusion at the point of purchase (i.e., as opposed to prices of goods in, e.g., many stores advertised on shelves without tax which is instead calculated at checkout by many vendors).

Then-Secretary of Transportation Mary Peters stated on August 15, 2007, that about 60% of federal gas taxes are used for highway and bridge construction. The remaining 40% goes to earmarked programs, including a minority for mass transit projects. However, revenues from other taxes are also used in federal transportation programs.

== Federal tax revenues ==
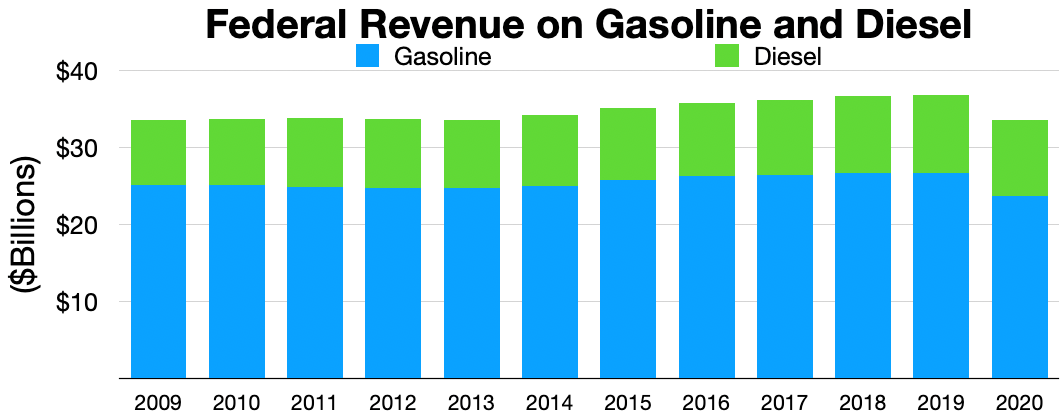
Federal tax revenue on gasoline and diesel

Federal fuel taxes raised $36.4 billion in Fiscal Year 2016, with $26.1 billion raised from gasoline taxes and $10.3 billion raised from diesel and special motor fuel taxes. The tax was last raised in 1993 and is not indexed to inflation. Total inflation from 1993 until 2017 was 68 percent or up to 77 percent, depending on the source.

== Public policy ==
Some policy advisors believe an increased tax is needed to fund and sustain the country's transportation infrastructure, including mass transit. As infrastructure construction costs have grown and vehicles have become more fuel efficient, the purchasing power of fixed-rate gas taxes has declined (i.e., the unchanged tax rate from 1993 provides less real money than it originally did, when adjusted for inflation). To offset this loss of purchasing power, The National Surface Transportation Infrastructure Financing Commission issued a detailed report in February 2009 recommending a 10 cent increase in the gasoline tax, a 15 cent increase in the diesel tax, and a reform tying both of these tax rates to inflation.

Critics of gas tax increases argue that much of the revenue is diverted to other government programs and debt servicing unrelated to transportation infrastructure. However, other researchers have noted that these diversions can occur in both directions and that gas taxes and "user fees" paid by drivers are not high enough to cover the full cost of road-related spending.

Some believe an increased fuel cost would encourage less consumption and reduce America's dependence on foreign oil. Americans sent nearly $430 billion to other countries in 2008 for the cost of imported oil. However, significantly since 2008, increased domestic output (e.g., fracking of shale and other energy resource discoveries) and rapidly growing production efficiencies have reduced considerably such spending, and this falling trend is expected to continue.

== Aviation fuel taxes ==
Aviation gasoline (Avgas): The tax on aviation gasoline is $0.194 per gallon. When used in a fractional ownership program aircraft, gasoline also is subject to a surtax of $0.141 per gallon.

Kerosene for use in aviation (Jet fuel): Generally, kerosene is taxed at $0.244 per gallon unless a reduced rate applies. For kerosene removed directly from an on-airport terminal (ramp) directly into the fuel tank of an aircraft for use in non-commercial aviation, the tax rate is $0.219. The rate of $0.219 also applies if kerosene is transported directly into any aircraft from a qualified refueler truck, tanker, or tank wagon that is loaded with the kerosene (again, when done directly on-airport, e.g., on the ramp). Notably, the airport terminal doesn't need to be a passenger-carrying, secured airport terminal for this rate to apply. However, the refueling truck, tanker, or tank wagon must meet the requirements discussed later under particular refueler trucks, tankers, and tank wagons treated as terminals.

These taxes mainly fund airport and Air Traffic Control operations by the Federal Aviation Administration (FAA), of which commercial aviation is the biggest user.

Taxes on gasoline and kerosene for aviation use have different tax rates than ground transportation by US state. The rate shown is in US cents per gallon as of September 2017 (an updated list is available as of February 2021).
State	Aviation Fuel Tax (excludes federal tax of 19.4¢/gal)	Jet Fuel Tax (excludes federal tax of 24.4¢/gal)	Notes
Alabama	9.5	3.5	
Alaska	4.7	3.2	
Arizona	5.0	0	Jet Fuel is not subject to Motor Fuel Taxes
Arkansas	21.8	22.8	Aviation Fuel and Jet Fuel are subject to 6.5% State Sales and Use Tax plus local sales and use tax based on the point of delivery
California	18.0	2.0	
Colorado	6.0	4.0	
Connecticut	exempt	exempt	Subject to additional 8.1% sales tax
Delaware	23.00	exempt	
District of Columbia	23.50	23.50	
Florida	6.95	6.9	may also be subject to local option taxes of up to an additional 12 cents
Georgia	7.5	7.5	subject to local sales tax
Hawaii	1.0	1.0	also subject to county tax of 8.8-18.0 cents and additional sales tax
Idaho	7.0	6.0	
Illinois	1.1	1.1	
Indiana	49.0	21.0	
Iowa	8.0	5.0	
Kansas	24.0	26.0	
Kentucky	26.00	exempt	Jet Fuel is subject to 6% Sales Tax
Louisiana	exempt	exempt	Exempt if used for aviation use; otherwise 20.0 cents per gallon
Maine	30.0	3.4	
Maryland	7.0	7.0	
Massachusetts	27.3	10.9	
Michigan	3.0	3.0	
Minnesota	5.0	15.0	
Mississippi	6.4	5.25	
Missouri	9.0	exempt	Additional charges apply for agriculture inspection fee and underground storage fee
Montana	4.0	4.0	
Nebraska	5.0	3.0	
Nevada	2.0	1.0	also subject to additional county taxes, up to 8 cents per gallon on Aviation Fuel, 4 cents per gallon for Jet Fuel
New Hampshire	4.0	2.0	The rate for Jet Fuel for aircraft operating under FAR Part 121 is 0.5 cents per gallon
New Jersey	10.56	13.56	
New Mexico	17.0	See notes	Jet Fuel is subject to gross receipts tax
New York	6.5	6.5	
North Carolina	0.0025	0.0025	tax is an inspection fee
North Dakota	8.0	8.0	
Ohio	exempt	exempt	
Oklahoma	0.08	0.08	Also, there is a $.01 per gallon Underground Storage Fee is due on all motor fuels
Oregon	11.0	3.0	
Pennsylvania	5.5	1.6	
Rhode Island	exempt	exempt	
South Carolina	0.25	0.25	Taxes are for inspection fee and environmental impact fee
South Dakota	6.0	4.0	
Tennessee	1.4	1.4	
Texas	20.0	20.0	
Utah	9.0	6.5	2.5 cents for federally certificated air carriers (@ international airport) 6.5 cents for federally certificated air carriers (airports other than international) 9 cents/gallon all other operations
Vermont	31.22	See Notes	Jet Fuel is subject to 6% Sales Tax
Virginia	5.0	5.0	
Washington	11.0	11.0	
West Virginia	11.7	11.7	
Wisconsin	6.0	6.0	
Wyoming	5.0	5.0	

== See also ==
- Carbon taxes in the United States
- Excise tax in the United States
- Federal Highway Trust Fund (United States)
- Gas tax holiday
- National Association of Convenience Stores
- RBOB - (Reformulated Blendstock for Oxygenate Blending)
