= AH77 =

Road in Asia

Asian Highway 77 (AH77) is a road in the Asian Highway Network running 1298 km (811 miles) from Jabal Saraj, Afghanistan to Mary, Turkmenistan. The route is as follows:

== Afghanistan ==
- NH06 : Jabal Seraj - Bamyan - Panjab
- NH67 : Panjab - Herat
- NH65 : Herat - Torghundi

== Turkmenistan ==
- A-388 Serhetabad - Mary
