= Virginia State Route 77 =

The following highways in Virginia have been known as State Route 77:

- State Route 77 (Virginia 1933-1940), now State Route 75
- State Route 77 (Virginia 1940-1942), now part of State Route 700
- Interstate 77 in Virginia, late 1950s – present
