= Interstate 86 =

Interstate 86 may refer to any of three unconnected Interstate Highways in the United States:

- Interstate 86 (Pennsylvania–New York)
- Interstate 86 (Idaho)
- Interstate 84 (Pennsylvania–Massachusetts), section east of East Hartford, Connecticut was formerly designated as Interstate 86
