= Interstate 87 =

Interstate 87 may refer to either of two unconnected Interstate Highways in the United States:

- Interstate 87 (New York), a highway running from New York City north to the Canadian border in Champlain, New York.
- Interstate 87 (North Carolina), a highway running from Raleigh, North Carolina, east to Wendell, North Carolina, that is planned to extend northeast toward Norfolk, Virginia.
