= Pioneer Homes =

American government public housing project

Coordinates: 43°02′27″N 76°08′35″W

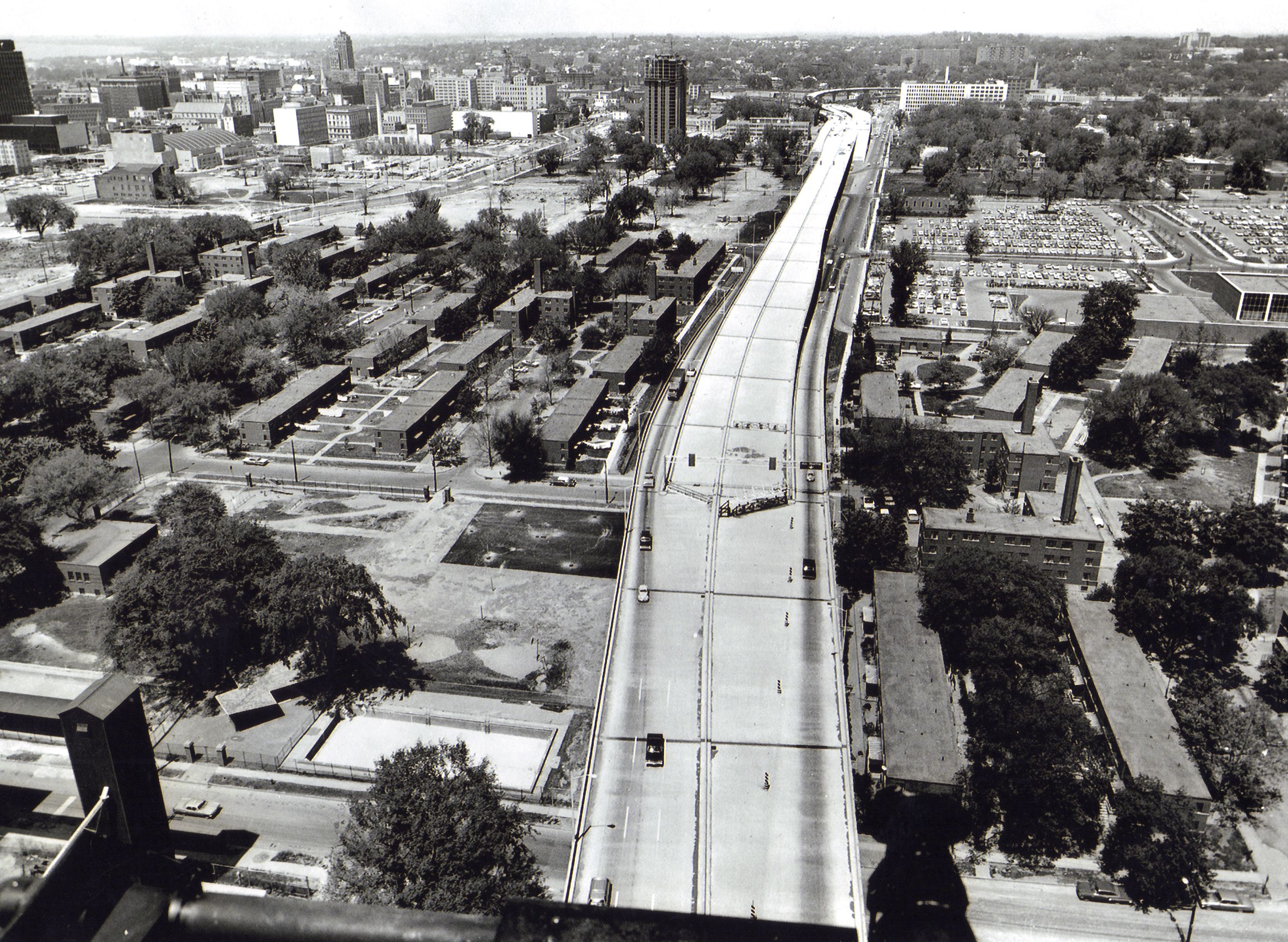
Aerial view of Interstate 81 cutting through the neighbourhood, still partly under construction, 1967

Pioneer Homes, in Syracuse, New York, was one of the earliest government public housing projects in the United States. Pioneer Homes was completed in 1941 and remains fully occupied even as another nearby public housing project was demolished.

The project consists of 607 apartments, which include both row houses and 3-story walk-ups, all constructed of masonry with brick exteriors in an early modern style. The project is bordered by East Adams Street, Renwick Avenue, Taylor Street, and South Townsend Street.

After a rash of drive-by shootings, the Syracuse Common Council voted in 2005 to gate off four out of the five project entrances to reduce traffic and crime.

The area is one of concentrated minority poverty, in which Syracuse led the United States as of 2013. That is partially blamed on Interstate 81, which runs through downtown Syracuse and is thought to contribute to segregation. Plans to replace or remove the aging span of I-81, a major concern of the Pioneer Homes Tenant Association, are ongoing, with plans due to be released in early 2019.
