= Interstate 88 =

Interstate 88 may refer to either of two United States Interstate highways:

- Interstate 88 (Illinois), running from East Moline to Hillside
- Interstate 88 (New York), running from Chenango to Rotterdam
