= Interstate 84 =

Interstate 84 may refer to:

- Interstate 84 (Oregon–Utah), passing through Idaho, formerly known as Interstate 80N
- Interstate 84 (Pennsylvania–Massachusetts), passing through New York and Connecticut
