= Interstate 76 =

Interstate 76 or I-76 may refer to:

== Transportation ==
- Interstate 76 (Colorado–Nebraska) (I-76), US
- Interstate 76 (Ohio–New Jersey) (I-76), running through Pennsylvania, US

== Other uses ==
- Interstate '76, a vehicular combat video game for Windows

== See also ==
- Japanese submarine I-76, later renamed Japanese submarine I-176
- Ilyushin Il-76 (Il-76), a Soviet aircraft
- Illinois Route 76 (IL 76), Illinois, US
