= South Carolina Highway 291 =

State highway in South Carolina, United States

South Carolina Highway 291
- Pleasantburg Drive

Route information
- Maintained by SCDOT
- Length: 11.400 mi (18.347 km)
- Existed: 1941–present

Major junctions
- South end: US 25 in Gantt
- I-85 in Greenville; I-385 in Greenville
- North end: SC 253 in Sans Souci

Location
- Country: United States
- State: South Carolina
- Counties: Greenville

Highway system
- South Carolina State Highway System; Interstate; US; State; Scenic
| ← SC 290 | → SC 292 |

South Carolina Highway 291 (SC 291), locally known as Pleasantburg Drive, is a 11.400-mile (18.347 km) state highway in the western part of the U.S. state of South Carolina. It travels as a major commercial artery for the eastern sections of Greenville in Greenville County. The highway travels by Greenville Technical College, the Greenville Downtown Airport, and Bob Jones University. The road south of U.S. Route 276 (US 276), Laurens Road, is called South Pleasantburg Drive, while the road north of Laurens Road is called North Pleasantburg Drive. The highway also connects Gantt with Sans Souci.

== Route description ==
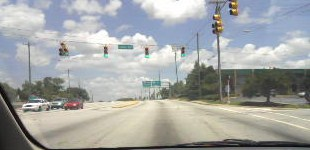
Northbound on North Pleasantburg Drive in Greenville just south of Interstate 385. Note: Picture is cropped from 2010.

The road begins at US 25 at Augusta Road, heading north as South Pleasantburg Drive, a six lane road, passing by businesses before an intersection over Interstate 85 (I-85). The road continues east as a commercial road, through many business in Greenville, passing by Greenville Technical College's (Greenville Tech) Barton (or Main) Campus and the former McAlister Square Shopping Center to the east of the road. At an interchange with US 276 (Laurens Road), the road becomes North Pleasantburg Drive, continuing north, passing the Greenville Downtown Airport and the Carolina First Center to the east via Tower Drive. The road then passes over Interstate 385, continuing north through the North Hills Shopping Center, quickly followed by Bob Jones University to the west. At the intersection with County Road 304, SC 291 turns west for one block before meeting with US 29 at Wade Hampton Boulevard, before turning northwest. It continues through more commercial development before making a turn west to South Carolina Highway 253 at Paris Mountain Road. According to the SCDOT, this is the official northern terminus. However, signage shows that it continues to an intersection with US 276 at Poinsett Highway.

== History ==
The road was established in 1941. From the 1960s to the 1980s, the Pleasantburg Drive or SC 291 area was the location for office and retail activity for the Greenville area. This included the establishment of McAlister Square in 1968 which closed in the early 2000s and is part of the University Center of Greenville. A revitalization plan for the Pleasantburg Drive area began in 1997 and a report was issued seven years later.

== Major intersections ==
The entire route is in Greenville County.

| Location | mi | km | Destinations | Notes |
|---|---|---|---|---|
| Gantt | 0.000 | 0.000 | US 25 (Augusta Road / White Horse Road) – Greenwood | Southern terminus |
| Greenville | 2.060 | 3.315 | I-85 – Spartanburg, Atlanta | I-85 exit 46B; missing movements via Augusta Road and Mauldin Road |
| Greenville | 5.850 | 9.415 | US 276 (Laurens Road) – Mauldin, Columbia | Interchange |
| Greenville | 6.940 | 11.169 | I-385 – Greenville, Columbia | I-385 exit 40A–B |
| Greenville–Wade Hampton line | 8.390 | 13.502 | Pine Knoll Drive north (US 29 Conn. north) / Edwards Road east | Southern terminus of US 29 Conn.; western terminus of Edwards Road; SC 291 turns left. |
| Greenville | 8.520 | 13.712 | US 29 (Wade Hampton Boulevard) – Spartanburg | |
| | 11.400 | 18.347 | SC 253 north (State Park Road) – Paris Mountain State Park | Southern end of SC 253 concurrency; official northern terminus |
| Sans Souci | | | US 276 (Poinsett Highway) / SC 253 south (East Blue Ridge Drive) – Furman University, Travelers Rest, Asheville | Northern end of SC 253 concurrency; signed northern terminus |
1.000 mi = 1.609 km; 1.000 km = 0.621 mi: Concurrency terminus; Incomplete access
