= South Carolina Highway 253 =

State highway in South Carolina, United States

South Carolina Highway 253

Route information
- Maintained by SCDOT
- Length: 19.656 mi (31.633 km)
- Existed: 1939–present

Major junctions
- South end: SC 124 in Parker
- US 25 in Parker; SC 183 in Parker; US 276 in Sans Souci; SC 291 near Sans Souci; SC 290 near Tigerville
- North end: SC 414 in Tigerville

Location
- Country: United States
- State: South Carolina
- Counties: Greenville

Highway system
- South Carolina State Highway System; Interstate; US; State; Scenic
← SC 252	→ SC 254

South Carolina Highway 253 (SC 253) is a 19.656-mile (31.633 km) primary state highway in the U.S. state of South Carolina. It runs in Greenville and is the gateway to Paris Mountain State Park and runs from Parker to Tigerville.

== Route description ==
The highway begins at SC 124 near Parker and travels 1/2 mi (0.80 km) northeast to SC 183 as West Blue Ridge Drive. It then moves up to Sulphur Springs Road where the road changes to East Blue Ridge Drive before intersecting at Poinsett Highway on U.S. Highway 276 (US 276) before running concurrently on SC 291 as North Pleasantburg Drive for 0.16 mi (0.26 km) before turning left at Paris Mountain Road. After traveling 2.53 mi (4.07 km) and passing Greenvista Drive, SC 253 becomes East Mountain Creek Road and traveling and additional 6.71 mi (10.80 km) before intersecting with SC 290. SC 253 then turns left and goes 7.22 mi (11.62 km) before terminating at SC 414 in Tigerville.

== History ==
SC 253 started in 1939 at the intersection of US 25 and US 276 to form an 11 mi (18 km) highway around Paris Mountain State Park, ending around Travelers Rest. Nine years later, SC 253 was reduced to secondary status with part of the road becoming county roads S-23-22. The road was resurrected in 1950 as a north-south road to Tigerville. In 1965, SC 253 was extended to SC 250 which is now part of US 25 and then extended southwest again between 1968 and 1970 to its current terminus at SC 124.

Improvements to the road include the road being fully paved in 1941 or 1942, being four-laned with SC 291 between 1968 and 1970, and four-laned again for a distance south of US 276 in 1977.

== Major intersections ==
The entire route is in Greenville County.

Location	mi	km	Destinations	Notes
Parker	0.000	0.000	SC 124 (Old Easley Highway) – Greenville, Easley	Southern terminus
Parker	0.490	0.789	US 25 (White Horse Road) to I-85 – Greenwood, Travelers Rest	
Parker	2.340	3.766	SC 183 (Cedar Lane Road) – Greenville, Pickens	
Sans Souci	4.550	7.323	US 276 (Poinsett Highway) – Greenville, Travelers Rest	
Sans Souci	4.700	7.564	SC 291 east (Pleasantburg Drive) – Wade Hampton	Western terminus of SC 291
	13.780	22.177	SC 290 east (Locust Hill Road) – Greer	Southern end of SC 290 concurrency
	14.007	22.542	SC 290 west (Locust Hill Road) – Slater-Marietta	Northern end of SC 290 concurrency
Tigerville	19.656	31.633	SC 414 – Campobello, Slater-Marietta	Northern terminus
1.000 mi = 1.609 km; 1.000 km = 0.621 mi: Concurrency terminus
