= Judson, South Carolina =

- Census-designated place
- Location within South Carolina Location within the United States
- Coordinates: 34°50′01″N 82°25′38″W
- Country: United States
- State: South Carolina
- County: Greenville

Area
  - Total: 0.79 sq mi (2.04 km^{2})
  - Land: 0.79 sq mi (2.04 km^{2})
  - Water: 0 sq mi (0.00 km^{2})
- Elevation: 988 ft (301 m)

Population (2020)
  - Total: 2,352
  - Density: 2,989.4/sq mi (1,154.23/km^{2})
- Time zone: UTC-5 (Eastern (EST))
  - Summer (DST): UTC-4 (EDT)
- FIPS code: 45-37465
- GNIS feature ID: 2402635

Judson is a census-designated place (CDP) in Greenville County, South Carolina, United States. The population was 2,050 at the 2010 census, down from 2,456 at the 2000 census. It is part of the Greenville–Mauldin–Easley Metropolitan Statistical Area.

== Geography ==
Judson is located in west-central Greenville County. It is bordered to the northeast by the city of Greenville, to the southeast by Dunean, to the west by Welcome, and to the north by Parker.

U.S. Route 123 (Easley Bridge Road) forms the northern border of Judson. The highway leads northeast 2.5 miles (4.0 km) to the center of Greenville and west 10 miles (16 km) to Easley.

According to the United States Census Bureau, the Judson CDP has a total area of 0.79 square miles (2.05 km^{2}), all land.

== Demographics ==
Historical population
Census	Pop.	Note	%±
2000	2,456		—
2010	2,050		−16.5%
2020	2,352		14.7%
U.S. Decennial Census

=== Racial and ethnic composition ===
Judson CDP, South Carolina – Racial and ethnic composition Note: the US Census treats Hispanic/Latino as an ethnic category. This table excludes Latinos from the racial categories and assigns them to a separate category. Hispanics/Latinos may be of any race.
Race / Ethnicity (NH = Non-Hispanic)	Pop 2000	Pop 2010	Pop 2020	% 2000	% 2010	% 2020
White alone (NH)	880	524	456	35.83%	25.56%	19.39%
Black or African American alone (NH)	1,389	1,206	1,046	56.56%	58.83%	44.47%
Native American or Alaska Native alone (NH)	6	5	3	0.24%	0.24%	0.13%
Asian alone (NH)	8	2	4	0.33%	0.10%	0.17%
Native Hawaiian or Pacific Islander alone (NH)	0	0	0	0.00%	0.00%	0.00%
Other race alone (NH)	4	1	14	0.16%	0.05%	0.60%
Mixed race or Multiracial (NH)	24	43	78	0.98%	2.10%	3.32%
Hispanic or Latino (any race)	145	269	751	5.90%	13.12%	31.93%
Total	2,456	2,050	2,352	100.00%	100.00%	100.00%

=== 2020 census ===
As of the 2020 United States census, there were 2,352 people, 610 households, and 353 families residing in the CDP.

=== 2000 census ===
As of the census of 2000, there were 2,456 people, 940 households, and 604 families residing in the CDP. The population density was 3,044.7 inhabitants per square mile (1,175.6/km^{2}). There were 1,143 housing units at an average density of 1,417.0 per square mile (547.1/km^{2}). The racial makeup of the CDP was 38.03% White, 56.72% African American, 0.24% Native American, 0.53% Asian, 3.01% from other races, and 1.47% from two or more races. Hispanic or Latino of any race were 5.90% of the population.

There were 940 households, out of which 32.2% had children under the age of 18 living with them, 32.1% were married couples living together, 23.9% had a female householder with no husband present, and 35.7% were non-families. 29.6% of all households were made up of individuals, and 10.5% had someone living alone who was 65 years of age or older. The average household size was 2.61 and the average family size was 3.23.

In the CDP, the population was spread out, with 29.2% under the age of 18, 8.0% from 18 to 24, 30.1% from 25 to 44, 21.9% from 45 to 64, and 10.7% who were 65 years of age or older. The median age was 34 years. For every 100 females, there were 96.8 males. For every 100 females age 18 and over, there were 92.5 males.

The median income for a household in the CDP was $23,839, and the median income for a family was $28,043. Males had a median income of $22,021 versus $21,333 for females. The per capita income for the CDP was $12,979. About 17.7% of families and 20.0% of the population were below the poverty line, including 26.2% of those under age 18 and 22.0% of those age 65 or over.
