= Dunean, South Carolina =

- Census-designated place
- Location within South Carolina Location within the United States
- Coordinates: 34°49′13″N 82°25′21″W
- Country: United States
- State: South Carolina
- County: Greenville

Area
  - Total: 1.57 sq mi (4.07 km^{2})
  - Land: 1.57 sq mi (4.07 km^{2})
  - Water: 0.0039 sq mi (0.01 km^{2})
- Elevation: 994 ft (303 m)

Population (2020)
  - Total: 3,740
  - Density: 2,381.2/sq mi (919.38/km^{2})
- Time zone: UTC-5 (Eastern (EST))
  - Summer (DST): UTC-4 (EDT)
- FIPS code: 45-21310
- GNIS feature ID: 2402417

Dunean is a census-designated place (CDP) in Greenville County, South Carolina, United States. The population was 3,671 at the 2010 census, down from 4,158 in 2000. It is part of the Greenville–Mauldin–Easley Metropolitan Statistical Area.

== Geography ==
Dunean is located in central Greenville County and is bordered to the northeast by the city of Greenville, to the north by unincorporated Judson, and to the south by Gantt, also unincorporated. Welcome is to the west. Interstate 185 runs along the southeastern edge of Dunean, turning into a surface highway (Mills Avenue/U.S. Route 29) east of the center of Dunean. I-185 leads southwest 2.5 miles (4.0 km) to its parent highway Interstate 85, and US 29 leads northeast 2.5 miles to the center of Greenville.

According to the United States Census Bureau, the Dunean CDP has a total area of 1.6 square miles (4.1 km^{2}), of which 1.87 acres (7,571 m^{2}), or 0.19%, are water.

== Demographics ==
Historical population
| Census | Pop. | Note | %± |
|---|---|---|---|
| 2020 | 3,740 | | — |
U.S. Decennial Census

=== 2020 census ===
As of the 2020 census, Dunean had a population of 3,740, with 1,631 households and 855 families residing in the CDP.

The median age was 37.3 years. 20.4% of residents were under the age of 18 and 14.6% were 65 years of age or older. For every 100 females there were 97.9 males, and for every 100 females age 18 and over there were 100.1 males age 18 and over.

100.0% of residents lived in urban areas, while 0.0% lived in rural areas.

Of the 1,631 households, 26.1% had children under the age of 18 living in them. 31.5% were married-couple households, 25.2% were households with a male householder and no spouse or partner present, and 33.7% were households with a female householder and no spouse or partner present. About 33.2% of all households were made up of individuals, and 12.5% had someone living alone who was 65 years of age or older.

There were 1,878 housing units, of which 13.2% were vacant. The homeowner vacancy rate was 1.6% and the rental vacancy rate was 14.2%.

Dunean racial composition
| Race | Num. | Perc. |
|---|---|---|
| White (non-Hispanic) | 1,861 | 49.76% |
| Black or African American (non-Hispanic) | 1,143 | 30.56% |
| Native American | 8 | 0.21% |
| Asian | 15 | 0.4% |
| Pacific Islander | 9 | 0.24% |
| Other/Mixed | 172 | 4.6% |
| Hispanic or Latino | 532 | 14.22% |

=== 2000 census ===
As of the census of 2000, there were 4,158 people, 1,779 households, and 1,056 families residing in the CDP. The population density was 2,499.0 inhabitants per square mile (964.9/km^{2}). There were 1,999 housing units at an average density of 1,201.4 per square mile (463.9/km^{2}). The racial makeup of the CDP was 67.99% White, 26.29% African American, 0.31% Native American, 0.51% Asian, 3.08% from other races, and 1.83% from two or more races. Hispanic or Latino of any race were 8.10% of the population.

There were 1,779 households, out of which 25.0% had children under the age of 18 living with them, 38.1% were married couples living together, 16.8% had a female householder with no husband present, and 40.6% were non-families. 34.1% of all households were made up of individuals, and 14.6% had someone living alone who was 65 years of age or older. The average household size was 2.34 and the average family size was 2.95.

In the CDP, the population was spread out, with 22.3% under the age of 18, 9.4% from 18 to 24, 30.0% from 25 to 44, 20.8% from 45 to 64, and 17.5% who were 65 years of age or older. The median age was 38 years. For every 100 females, there were 91.9 males. For every 100 females age 18 and over, there were 90.9 males.

The median income for a household in the CDP was $25,319, and the median income for a family was $32,563. Males had a median income of $25,332 versus $21,651 for females. The per capita income for the CDP was $13,833. About 16.9% of families and 18.8% of the population were below the poverty line, including 21.6% of those under age 18 and 14.2% of those age 65 or over.

== Photographs ==
Photographs of the mill, village, and community can be viewed in the Greenville County Library System digital collections.
