= City View, South Carolina =

- Census-designated place
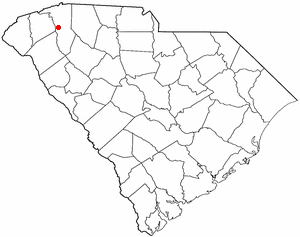
- Location of City View, South Carolina
- Coordinates: 34°51′44″N 82°25′30″W
- Country: United States
- State: South Carolina
- County: Greenville

Area
  - Total: 0.44 sq mi (1.14 km^{2})
  - Land: 0.44 sq mi (1.14 km^{2})
  - Water: 0 sq mi (0.00 km^{2})
- Elevation: 971 ft (296 m)

Population (2020)
  - Total: 1,322
  - Density: 3,012.8/sq mi (1,163.23/km^{2})
- Time zone: UTC-5 (Eastern (EST))
  - Summer (DST): UTC-4 (EDT)
- FIPS code: 45-14455
- GNIS feature ID: 2402778

City View, a former incorporated city, is now a census-designated place (CDP) in Greenville County, South Carolina, United States. The population was 1,345 at the 2010 census, up from 1,254 in 2000. It is part of the Greenville–Mauldin–Easley Metropolitan Statistical Area.

== History ==
Monaghan Mill and Parker High School Auditorium are listed on the National Register of Historic Places.

== Geography ==
City View is located in central Greenville County and is bordered to the east by the city of Greenville. To the north is unincorporated San Souci, and to the west is Parker, also unincorporated.

According to the United States Census Bureau, the City View CDP has a total area of 0.53 square miles (1.36 km^{2}), of which 0.52 square miles (1.34 km^{2}) are land and 0.01 square miles (0.02 km^{2}), or 1.17%, are water.

== Demographics ==
Historical population
Census	Pop.	Note	%±
2020	1,322		—
U.S. Decennial Census

As of the census of 2000, there were 1,254 people, 469 households, and 296 families residing in the CDP. The population density was 2,355.0 inhabitants per square mile (909.3/km^{2}). There were 575 housing units at an average density of 1,079.8 per square mile (416.9/km^{2}). The racial makeup of the CDP was 63.08% White, 31.50% African American, 0.88% Native American, 0.24% Asian, 2.63% from other races, and 1.67% from two or more races. Hispanic or Latino of any race were 7.50% of the population.

There were 469 households, out of which 34.1% had children under the age of 18 living with them, 35.0% were married couples living together, 22.0% had a female householder with no husband present, and 36.7% were non-families. 29.4% of all households were made up of individuals, and 9.2% had someone living alone who was 65 years of age or older. The average household size was 2.67 and the average family size was 3.32.

In the CDP, the population was spread out, with 29.5% under the age of 18, 9.6% from 18 to 24, 30.7% from 25 to 44, 20.9% from 45 to 64, and 9.3% who were 65 years of age or older. The median age was 32 years. For every 100 females, there were 91.7 males. For every 100 females age 18 and over, there were 84.9 males.

The median income for a household in the CDP was $21,920, and the median income for a family was $25,208. Males had a median income of $25,847 versus $18,824 for females. The per capita income for the CDP was $9,532. About 27.6% of families and 29.0% of the population were below the poverty line, including 37.3% of those under age 18 and 9.7% of those age 65 or over.
