= EFB =

EFB may refer to:

== Science and technology ==
- Anisogramma anomala, a plant pathogen affecting Corylus spp. (hazelnut)
- Electronic flight bag, an information management device for flight crews
- European foulbrood, a honeybee disease
- Enhanced flooded battery, an automobile battery technology

== Organisations ==
- European Federation of Biotechnology
- French Bilingual School of South Carolina (French: École Française Bilingue), US

== Sport ==
- Esbjerg fB, a Danish football club
  - EfB Ishockey, a Danish professional ice hockey team
