= New Year's Day March =

Anti-segregation protest in Greenville, South Carolina, USA

- Part of the Civil Rights Movement in South Carolina
- Date: January 1, 1960
- Location: Greenville, South Carolina
- Caused by: Racial segregation of the local airport
- Result: Henry v. Greenville Airport Commission (1961); Integration of Greenville Municipal Airport; Launching of the civil rights movement in Greenville

Parties
National Association for the Advancement of Colored People (NAACP); Congress of Racial Equality (CORE)	Greenville Municipal Airport; O.L. Andrews

Lead figures
Reverend James S. Hall Jr. Reverend T.B. Thomas; James T. McCain; Jackie Robinson; Alice Spearman; Governor Fritz Hollings (Note: While Hollings did not actively require the airport to desegregate, he did support the protesters unlike most government officials across the South during the civil rights movement.)	Greenville Municipal Airport

The New Year's Day March in Greenville, South Carolina was a 1,000-man march held on January 1, 1960, that protested the segregated facilities at the Greenville Municipal Airport, now renamed the Greenville Downtown Airport. The march occurred after Richard Henry and Jackie Robinson were prohibited from using a white-only waiting room at the airport. The march was the first large-scale movement of the civil rights movement in South Carolina and Greenville. The march brought state-wide attention to segregation, and the case Henry v. Greenville Airport Commission (1961) ultimately required the airport's integration of its facilities.

== Background ==
=== Richard Henry ===
In February 1959, Richard Henry, an African American civilian Air Force employee, planned to fly out of the Greenville, South Carolina Municipal Airport to Michigan. Henry was instructed to sit in the "Negro" waiting room at the airport, which was considerably less comfortable and more poorly furnished than the white waiting room. Henry refused to sit in the colored section and was told by the airport manager, O.L. Andrews, that he was not permitted to sit in the whites-only waiting room. Disgusted, Henry filed complaints with the U.S. Air Force, the NAACP, and local airport authorities. With the assistance of the NAACP, Henry filed a suit claiming discrimination and the denial of the equal protection clause granted by the Fourteenth Amendment to the United States Constitution. Representatives from the NAACP later purchased tickets to Charlotte, North Carolina and attempted to use the white waiting room. They were also instructed to move. Little was done at the local level to desegregate the airport with any speed or haste.

=== Jackie Robinson ===
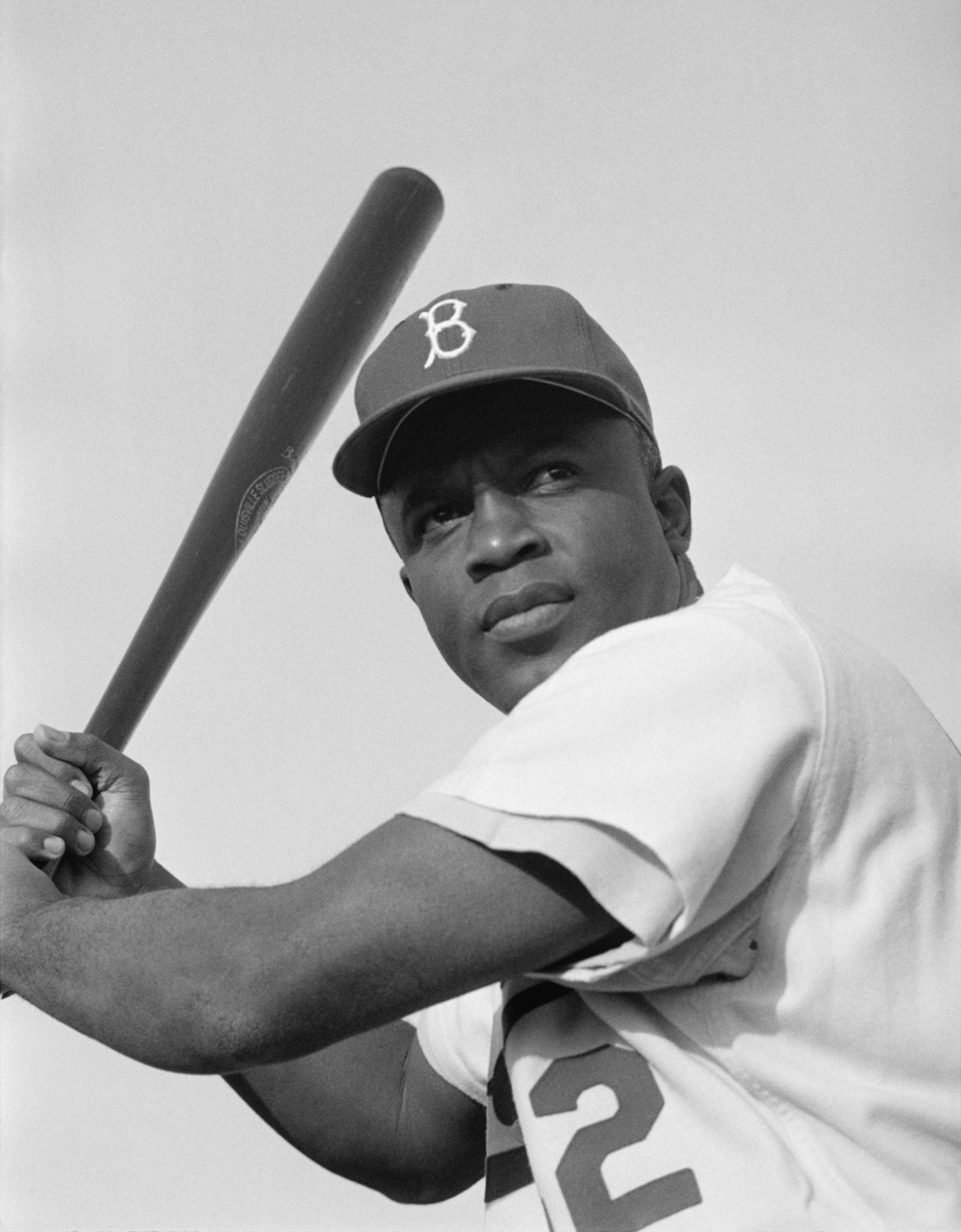
Jackie Robinson, Brooklyn Dodgers, 1954

On the morning of October 25, 1959, Jackie Robinson, the first African American Major League Baseball player, was expected to speak at an NAACP banquet at Springfield Baptist Church in downtown Greenville. Robinson was flying from New York to Greenville, and a small, African American delegation awaited his arrival at the airport. Airport manager O.L. Andrews told the group that they were waiting in the wrong room and would have to move to the colored section. When the delegation refused to move, Andrews threatened arrest. The group stood up, but they did not leave the room. Andrews summoned a police officer and instructed the officer to arrest anyone who re-seated themselves. Before the confrontation could further escalate, Robinson's plane arrived and the delegation departed the airport. Robinson spoke of this discrimination at the banquet, and he urged "complete freedom" by encouraging all African Americans to vote, to protest racial inequality, and to never lose self-respect.

That evening, following the conclusion of the banquet, Robinson and Gloster Current, accompanied by Pastor and Mrs. James Hall, were to fly out of the same airport. When Robinson and Current arrived, they sat in the white-only waiting room. While Robinson was signing autographs for fans, airport manager Andrews orders the group to move to the colored room. They refused. Andrews brought a police officer and instructed him to arrest anyone who continued to sit. Robinson and Current argued that they had a legal right to remain seated. At the time, segregation had been considered unlawful for many years, though many facilities throughout the South were slow to integrate. Ultimately, the group was permitted to board the plane without further issues. Following the incident, Robinson sent letters to Thurgood Marshall, a civil rights lawyer at the time, describing the incident at the airport. He urged the NAACP defense team to take legal action. Marshall, however, dismissed Robinson's plea as a "waste of time;" he noted that Richard Henry's case was still working its way through the federal court system.

== New Year's Day March, 1960 ==
Following the incident at the airport with Jackie Robinson, Reverends James Hall and T.B. Thomas organized a march to protest the segregationist policies of the Greenville Municipal Airport. They were assisted by the NAACP and the Congress of Racial Equality (CORE) with the ultimate goal of protesting the "stigma, inconvenience, and the stupidity of racial segregation."

January 1st was chosen specifically as it marked the 97th anniversary of President Abraham Lincoln's Emancipation Proclamation, which attempted to free slaves in Confederate states in 1863. The purpose of the march was not only to protest segregated facilities, but also to voice outrage over the humiliation of racism against Jackie Robinson. Springfield Baptist Church in downtown Greenville, which served as a catalyst for many events in Greenville's civil rights movement, was the starting point for the march. Between 1,000 and 1,500 gathered at Springfield Baptist Church for an emancipation service. The initial plan was to have a march of 5,000 people, but after the service, approximately 1,000 (Note: Sources vary on the actual number of the march. Some say as high as 1,500 while others say as low as 1,000. Many pro-segregationist news sources at the time, such as the Greenville News, downplayed the number of protesters to 250.) marched through the rain and sleet to the airport, which was about ten miles from the church. Some protesters drove halfway, parked, and walked to the airport. The mayor of Greenville and Governor Fritz Hollings dispatched police and highway patrolmen to guard the protesters. Alice Spearman, the executive director of the South Carolina Council on Human Relations, remarked that this was the first time that any government in a Southern state used police to protect black protesters. Governor Fritz Hollings (1959–1963), initially opposed integration but reversed his position midway through his gubernatorial term, advocating for integration "with dignity." He was the first governor of South Carolina to support integration since the Reconstruction era in the 1870s. However, while Hollings did facilitate the desegregation of public facilities, he noted in his directive to send police to protect marchers that he wanted the government to enforce the law, not "rednecks" or "members of the Klan."

Protesters sang songs as they marched, including various religious hymns and "America the Beautiful". Reverend Hall referred to the march as a "prayer pilgrimage." Since the news of the march had been publicized prior to the event, when protesters arrived at the airport, they were greeted by a 300-man white crowd, including members of the Ku Klux Klan. The protesters had not expected to be greeted by this crowd; many marches were caught off guard. However, some whites came at the request of Alice Spearman, and they joined in the protest and sang songs.

In objection to the march, the airport management lowered the U.S. flag and the South Carolina flag from the building and locked all but one door. A delegation of fifteen African American ministers entered the airport on behalf of the protesters where they prayed for "their enemies" and read a resolution. Hall added, "The Negro is restless and will not be satisfied until every public sign that says 'colored' and 'white' is burned and the smoke is in the clouds." M.D. McCollom, a minister from Orangeburg, presented a five-point resolution to airport officials:

Be it resolved:

1. That we are only demanding that which is the due of every citizen of the United States of America.

2. That we will not make a pretense of being satisfied with the crumbs of citizenship while other enjoy the whole loaf only by right of a white-skinned birth.

3. That we should be base citizens, indeed, unworthy to be called Americans if we acquiesced in the degradation which Southern tradition would impose upon us.

4. That our insistence upon the right to participate fully in the democratic processes of our nation is an expression of our patriotism and not a defection to some foreign ideology.

5. That with faith in this nation and its God we shall not relent, we shall not rest, we shall not compromise, we shall not be satisfied until every vestige of racial discrimination and segregation has been eliminated from all aspects of our public life.

The group, maintaining its commitment to peace and nonviolence, left the airport and returned to downtown Greenville. The march lasted between four and five hours and occurred without any arrests or violence. The large police presence protecting marchers was likely a deterrent for any mob-style fighting. Additionally, seeing the brutality that erupted in other states, such as Alabama and Mississippi, leaders in Greenville and South Carolina sought to desegregate relatively quickly. Shortly after the march, segregationist policies around the city and the state began to erode.

== Results ==
=== Henry v. Greenville Airport Commission (1961) ===
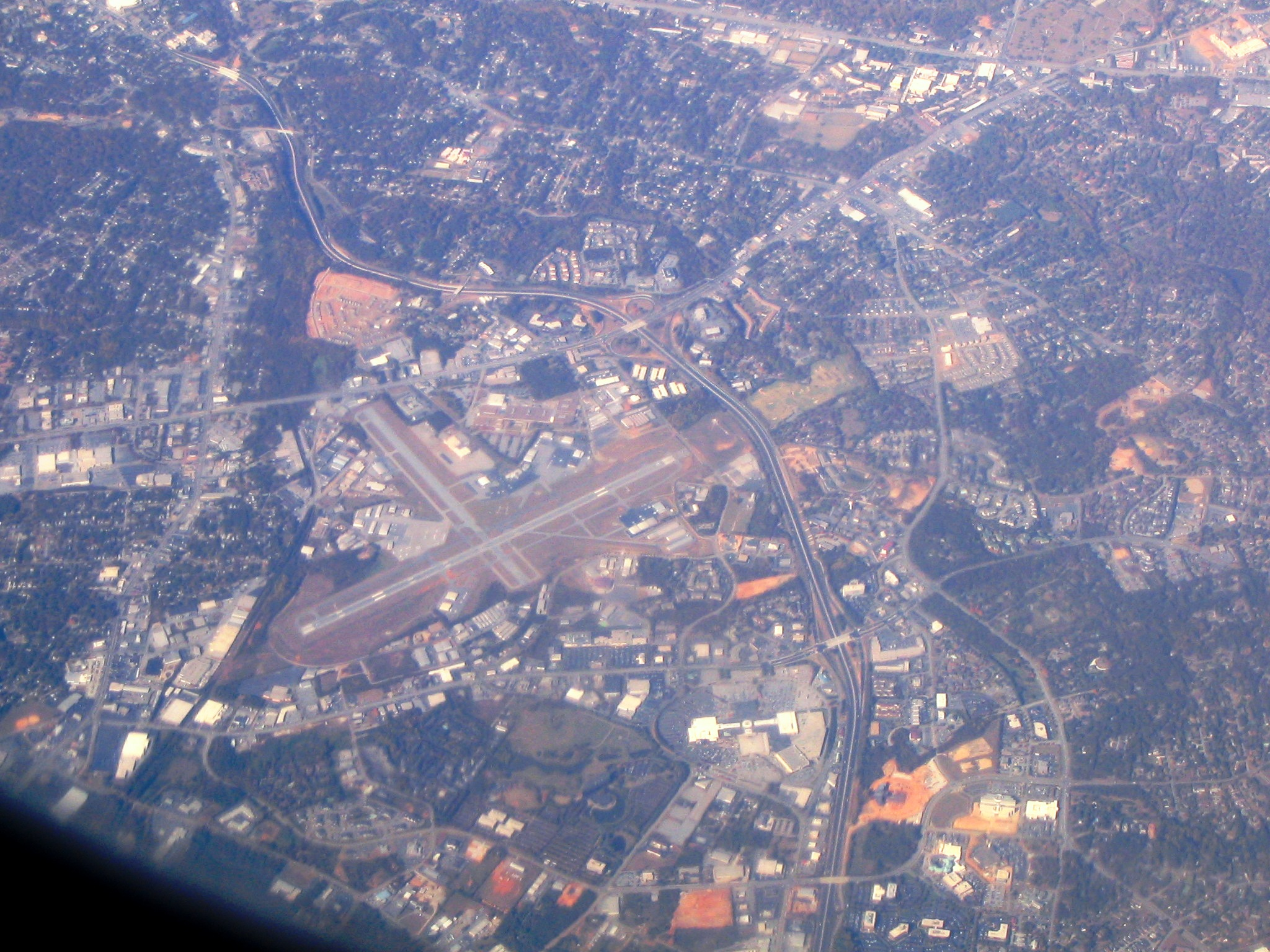
Aerial view of the Greenville Downtown Airport

Richard Henry initially lost his suit against the Greenville airport. Judge George Timmerman, a former South Carolina governor that opposed Brown v. Board of Education (1954) and federally-mandated segregation, ruled in favor of the airport. Timmerman, citing Plessy v. Ferguson (1896), which had already been overturned by Brown v. Board (1954), wrote that no law or constitutional principle "requires others to accept [Henry] as a companion or social equal." Timmerman further declared that Henry had no intention of waiting in the white room, but was instead attempting to "instigating litigation." Furthermore, the court argued that Henry did not receive irreparable injury by being prohibited from the whites-only waiting room. Henry, however, won the case on appeal, and the airport desegregated under a mandatory court order in February 1961. The ruling prohibited the airport "from making any distinction based upon color in regard to services at the Greenville Municipal Airport." In October 1962, the Greenville–Spartanburg International Airport opened, rendering the Greenville Downtown Airport as a location that focuses more predominately on the flying small aircraft. The new airport opened without any segregationist policies.

=== Other impact of the march ===
The New Year's Day March was the first large-scale civil rights protest in Greenville, and it occurred without any violence or arrests. (Note: While many civil rights protests in South Carolina resulted in arrests, violence was not as prevalent as was in Alabama and Mississippi. The Orangeburg Massacre was a notable exception.) Within a month of the march, students at Sterling High School would organize sit-ins at segregated lunch counters in the downtown area, inspired by the Greensboro sit-ins. By March 1960, Jesse Jackson would successfully lead the Greenville Eight on a sit-in of the segregated library system. On July 1, 1961, Charles E. Daniel, a former U.S. Senator from South Carolina, unexpectedly admitted that the separation of races was a policy that needed to be changed: “The desegregation issue cannot continue to be hidden behind the door. This situation cannot be settled at the lunch counter and bus station levels. We must handle this ourselves, more realistically than heretofore" Furthermore, Governor Fritz Hollings' endeavor to integrate schools "with dignity" meant that South Carolina was often out of the national spotlight when desegregation began.

== See also ==
- African Americans in South Carolina
