= Parker High School Auditorium =

- U.S. National Register of Historic Places
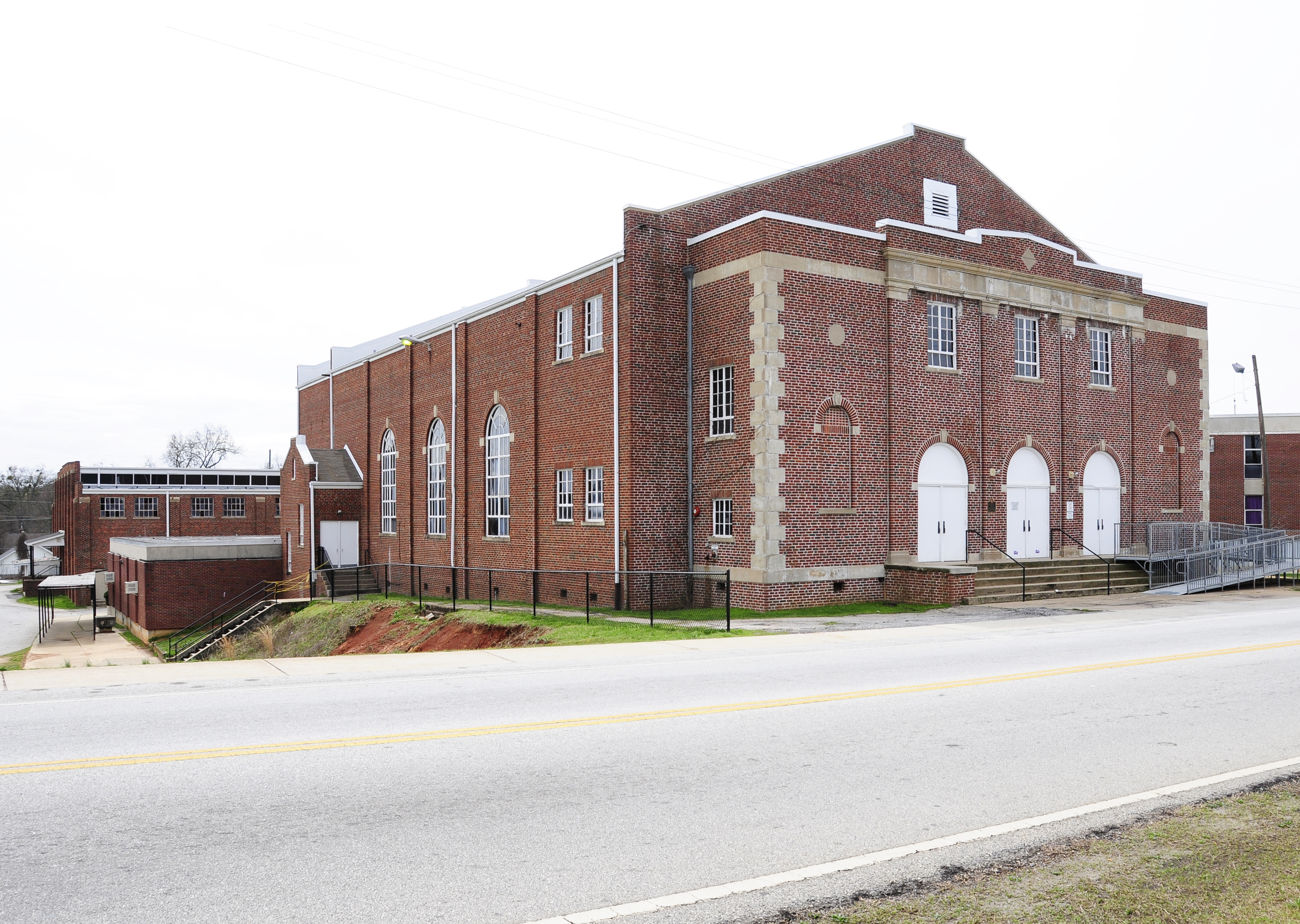
- Parker High School Auditorium, March 2012

- Location within South Carolina Location within the United States
- Location: 900 Woodside Ave., City View, South Carolina
- Coordinates: 34°51′32.6″N 82°25′35.0″W
- Area: less than one acre
- Built: 1938
- Built by: Works Progress Administration
- Architectural style: Classical Revival
- NRHP reference No.: 96000144
- Added to NRHP: February 26, 1996

Parker High School Auditorium is a historic high school auditorium located at Greenville, South Carolina. It was built in 1938 with funding provided by the Works Progress Administration. It is a Classical Revival style 7500 square foot rectangular brick building with a front gabled roof. It is the last remaining building from the largest WPA school project in South Carolina.

It was added to the National Register of Historic Places in 1996.
