= South Carolina Highway 414 =

State highway in South Carolina, United States

South Carolina Highway 414

Route information
- Auxiliary route of SC 14
- Maintained by SCDOT
- Length: 17.260 mi (27.777 km)

Major junctions
- West end: US 276 near Marietta
- US 25 near Marietta; SC 253 in Tigerville; SC 101 in Highland
- East end: SC 14 near Highland

Location
- Country: United States
- State: South Carolina
- Counties: Greenville

Highway system
- South Carolina State Highway System; Interstate; US; State; Scenic
← SC 413	→ SC 417

South Carolina Highway 414 (SC 414) is a 17.260-mile (27.777 km) state highway in the U.S. state of South Carolina. The highway travels through mostly rural areas of Greenville County.

== Route description ==
SC 414 begins at an intersection with U.S. Route 276 (US 276; Geer Highway) south of Marietta, within Greenville County. It travels to the north-northeast and curves to the northeast and crosses Bull Creek. The highway curves to the east-southeast and has a very brief concurrency with US 25. SC 414 travels to the northeast and crosses over Mush and Johnson creeks. It travels through North Greenville University in Tigerville. On the southeastern edge of the university is an intersection with the northern terminus of SC 253 (Mountain View Road). SC 414 crosses over the South Tyger River. Then, it heads in a more easterly direction and crosses Tyger Cemetery. The highway enters Highland, where it has a very brief concurrency with SC 101. It curves to the east and passes Ebenezer Cemetery just before heading to the southeast. It curves back to the east just before meeting its eastern terminus, an intersection with SC 14.

== Major intersections ==
The entire route is in Greenville County.

Location	mi	km	Destinations	Notes
	0.000	0.000	US 276 (Geer Highway) – Travelers Rest, Marietta	Western terminus
	4.770	7.677	US 25 south – Greenville	Western end of US 25 concurrency
	4.830	7.773	US 25 north – Asheville	Eastern end of US 25 concurrency
Tigerville	8.830	14.211	SC 253 south (Mountain View Road) – Greenville	Northern terminus of SC 253
Highland	12.180	19.602	SC 101 north to SC 11 – Seneca	Western end of SC 101 concurrency
Highland	12.300	19.795	SC 101 south – Greer	Eastern end of SC 101 concurrency
	17.260	27.777	SC 14 – Greer, Gowensville, Landrum	
1.000 mi = 1.609 km; 1.000 km = 0.621 mi: Concurrency terminus
