= French Bilingual School of South Carolina =

Coordinates: 34.8718°N 82.3134°W

- (French: École Française Bilingue - South Carolina
- Wade Hampton, South Carolina; United States

Information
- Type: Private
- Established: 1974

The French Bilingual School of South Carolina (French: École Française Bilingue - South Carolina, EFB) was an overseas French school in Greenville, South Carolina in unincorporated Greenville County, South Carolina, in the Greenville-Spartanburg area. The school served Kindergarten through the 12th grade and used the curriculum of the French Ministry of Education. The elementary section included grades K-5, the middle section included grades 6-9, and the high school section included grades 10-12. Michelin opened and operated the school for its employees expatriated to South Carolina. For that reason its official name was the Michelin French School. French expatriate families who did not work for Michelin were required to pay tuition.

== History ==
The school opened in 1974 after Michelin opened its North American headquarters in the area. The number of students varied through the years between 55 and 130 and the number of teachers between 12 and 22.

The school was replaced by several entities around Greenville, like Cours de Français de Greenville, The Int. School of Greenville and The French School.
