= Welcome, South Carolina =

- Census-designated place
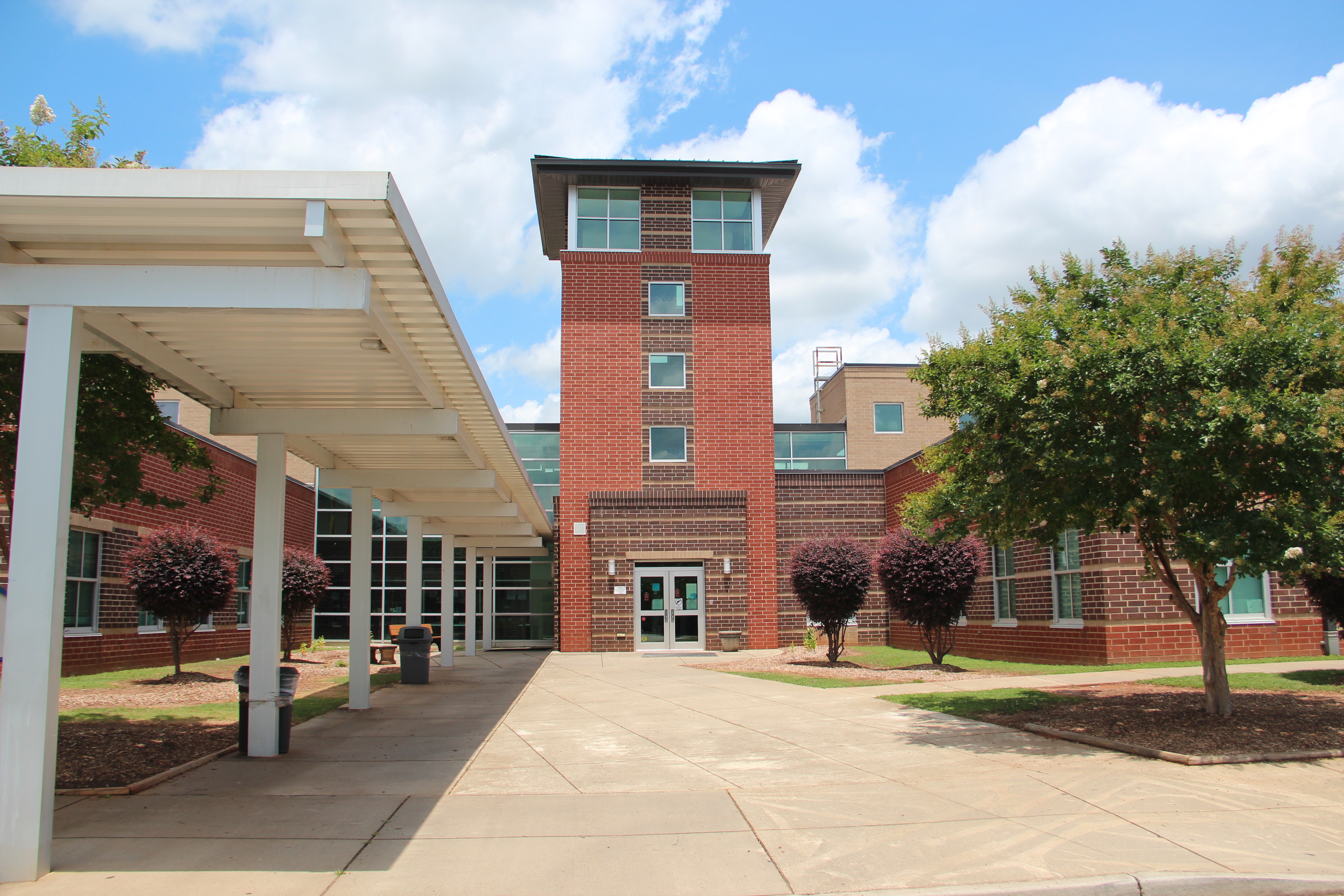
- Tanglewood Middle School in Welcome

- Location of Welcome, South Carolina
- Coordinates: 34°49′13″N 82°27′36″W
- Country: United States
- State: South Carolina
- County: Greenville

Area
  - Total: 4.66 sq mi (12.07 km^{2})
  - Land: 4.61 sq mi (11.95 km^{2})
  - Water: 0.046 sq mi (0.12 km^{2})
- Elevation: 955 ft (291 m)

Population (2020)
  - Total: 7,298
  - Density: 1,582.0/sq mi (610.82/km^{2})
- Time zone: UTC-5 (Eastern (EST))
  - Summer (DST): UTC-4 (EDT)
- ZIP code: 29611
- Area codes: 864, 821
- FIPS code: 45-75535
- GNIS feature ID: 2402994

Welcome is a census-designated place (CDP) in Greenville County, South Carolina, United States. The population was 6,668 at the 2010 census. It is part of the Greenville–Mauldin–Easley Metropolitan Statistical Area. Welcome has been noted for its colorful place name.

== Geography ==
Welcome is located in west-central Greenville County. It is bordered to the north by Parker, to the east by Judson, to the southwest by Powdersville in Anderson County and to the west by Pickens County. The western border of the CDP follows the Saluda River, which forms the county line.

U.S. Route 123 (New Easley Highway) forms the northern edge of the CDP; the highway leads east 4 miles (6 km) to the center of Greenville and west 9 miles (14 km) to Easley. U.S. Route 25 (White Horse Road) passes through the east side of the CDP, leading north 10 miles (16 km) to Travelers Rest and south 4 miles (6 km) to Gantt.

According to the United States Census Bureau, the Welcome CDP has a total area of 4.7 square miles (12.1 km^{2}), of which 0.04 square miles (0.1 km^{2}), or 1.05%, are water.

== Demographics ==
Historical population
Census	Pop.	Note	%±
2020	7,298		—
U.S. Decennial Census

=== 2020 census ===
Welcome racial composition
Race	Num.	Perc.
White (non-Hispanic)	2,940	40.29%
Black or African American (non-Hispanic)	2,109	28.9%
Native American	13	0.18%
Asian	26	0.36%
Pacific Islander	5	0.07%
Other/Mixed	302	4.14%
Hispanic or Latino	1,903	26.08%

As of the 2020 United States census, there were 7,298 people, 3,073 households, and 1,801 families residing in the CDP.

=== 2000 census ===
As of the census of 2000, there were 6,390 people, 2,696 households, and 1,771 families residing in the CDP. The population density was 1,384.7 inhabitants per square mile (534.6/km^{2}). There were 2,947 housing units at an average density of 638.6 per square mile (246.6/km^{2}). The racial makeup of the CDP was 75.74% White, 17.98% African American, 0.41% Native American, 0.13% Asian, 0.17% Pacific Islander, 4.43% from other races, and 1.14% from two or more races. Hispanic or Latino of any race were 7.87% of the population.

There were 2,696 households, out of which 27.0% had children under the age of 18 living with them, 47.4% were married couples living together, 13.9% had a female householder with no husband present, and 34.3% were non-families. 30.5% of all households were made up of individuals, and 12.0% had someone living alone who was 65 years of age or older. The average household size was 2.35 and the average family size was 2.90.

In the CDP, the population was spread out, with 21.9% under the age of 18, 8.9% from 18 to 24, 29.0% from 25 to 44, 23.8% from 45 to 64, and 16.3% who were 65 years of age or older. The median age was 38 years. For every 100 females, there were 92.9 males. For every 100 females age 18 and over, there were 89.3 males.

The median income for a household in the CDP was $31,851, and the median income for a family was $39,531. Males had a median income of $31,086 versus $22,368 for females. The per capita income for the CDP was $17,451. About 7.9% of families and 10.9% of the population were below the poverty line, including 8.8% of those under age 18 and 10.7% of those whose ages are 65 or over.
