= Cedar Falls Park =

Park in South Carolina

Coordinates: 34°36′57″N 82°17′59″W

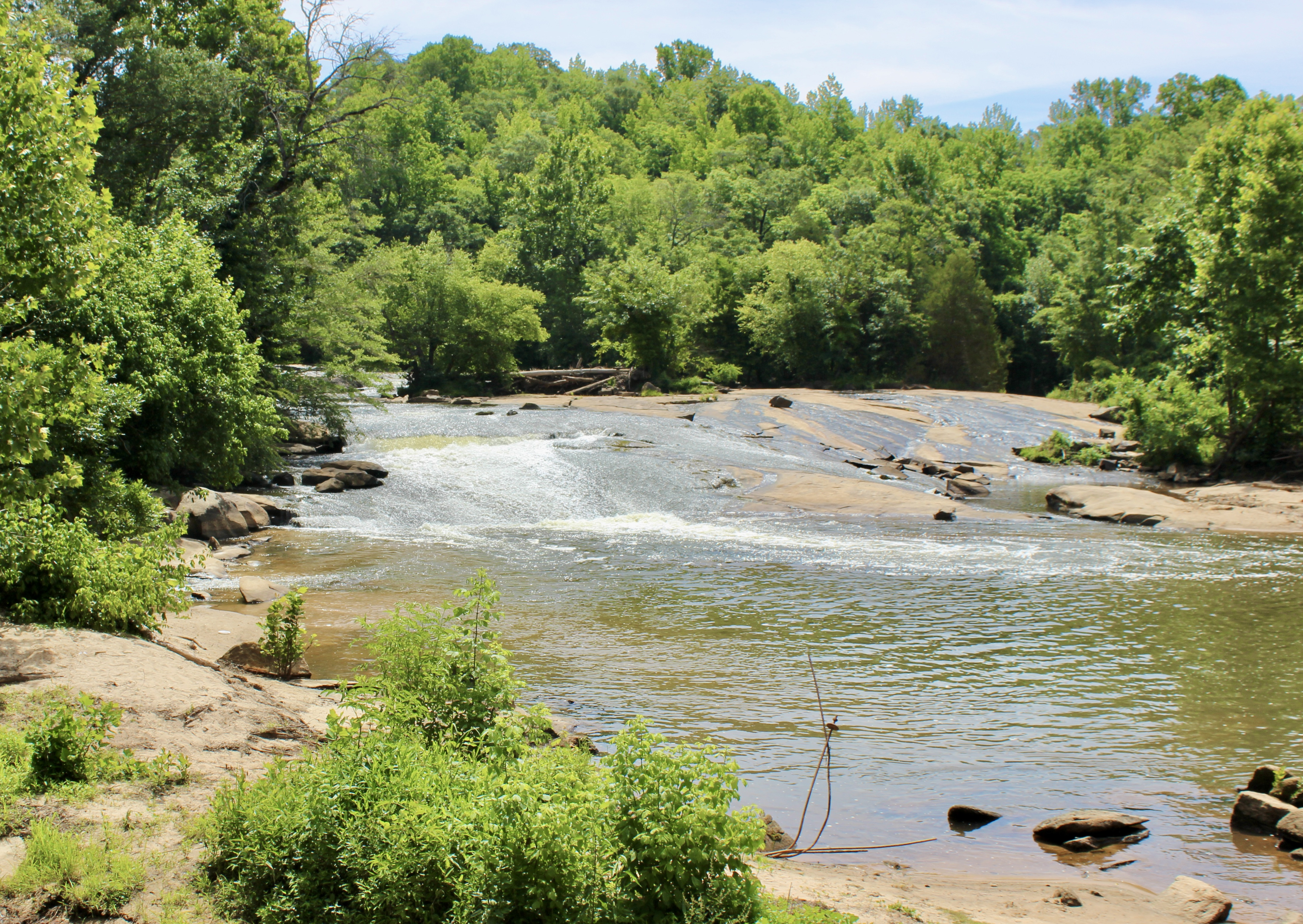
Shoals at Cedar Falls Park, Greenville County, South Carolina

Cedar Falls Park is a 90-acre (36 ha) recreation area in Upstate South Carolina where the Reedy River widens to 200 feet (61 m), cascading over rocks and boulders. The park is maintained by Greenville County Parks, Recreation, and Tourism.

== History and features ==
Cedar Falls has local historical significance. Cherokee used the shoals as a hunting campsite and a ford across the river. In the early 19th century, pioneer Hudson Berry (1752–1840) acquired and expanded a dam to power a sawmill, grist mill, textile mill, and cotton gin. In 1910, a larger dam was built to provide electricity for Fork Shoals Mill. Though this dam was torn down in 1950, remains of both structures are visible.

The park was created in 2011 after Greenville County used $2.7 million to buy 87 acres of land near the river, the money to do so having been set aside in the South Carolina Mitigation Trust Fund created from a $7 million fine levied by the EPA against Colonial Pipeline, after a major spill occurred on the Reedy River in June 1996. A grant from the state parks department and money from the U.S. Department of the Interior helped develop the property.

The park has 2.2 miles (3.5 km) of paved and unpaved trails for hiking, biking, and horseback riding, restrooms, a small picnic shelter, a playground, and a sand volleyball court.
