= South Carolina Highway 124 =

State highway in South Carolina, United States

South Carolina Highway 124

Route information
- Maintained by SCDOT
- Length: 5.630 mi (9.061 km)

Major junctions
- West end: US 123 near Parker
- US 25 in Parker; US 123 in Greenville
- East end: SC 81 in Greenville

Location
- Country: United States
- State: South Carolina
- Counties: Pickens, Greenville

Highway system
- South Carolina State Highway System; Interstate; US; State; Scenic
← US 123	→ SC 125

South Carolina Highway 124 (SC 124) is a 5.630-mile (9.061 km) state highway in the U.S. state of South Carolina. The highway connects Parker and Greenville.

== Route description ==
SC 124 begins at an intersection with U.S. Route 123 (US 123; Calhoun Memorial Highway) southwest of Parker, within Pickens County. It travels to the northeast and immediately crosses Georges Creek. It curves to the east-northeast and crosses the Saluda River, where it enters Greenville County and Parker. It begins paralleling some railroad tracks just before intersecting SC 253 at its southern terminus and an interchange with U.S. Route 25 (US 25; White Horse Road). It passes Graceland Cemetery West. On the northeastern corner of the cemetery, the highway curves to the east-southeast and leaves the railroad tracks. It crosses some railroad tracks and curves to the east-northeast. It enters Greenville and begins to curve to the southeast. It has a second intersection with US 123 (Easley Bridge Road/Academy Street). Just northwest of Greenville Senior High School, the highway meets its eastern terminus, an intersection with Anderson Street (where SC 81 also ends) and Vardry Street.

== Major intersections ==
County	Location	mi	km	Destinations	Notes
Pickens		0.000	0.000	US 123 (Calhoun Memorial Highway) – Easley, Greenville	Western terminus
Greenville	Parker	2.860	4.603	SC 253 north (West Blue Ridge Drive)	Southern terminus of SC 253
Greenville	Parker	3.460	5.568	US 25 (White Horse Road) to I-85 – Greenwood, Travelers Rest	Interchange
Greenville	Greenville	5.140	8.272	US 123 (Easley Bridge Road/Academy Street)	
Greenville	Greenville	5.630	9.061	SC 81 south (Anderson Street) / Vardry Street	Eastern terminus of SC 124; northern terminus of SC 81
1.000 mi = 1.609 km; 1.000 km = 0.621 mi
