= Haywood Mall =

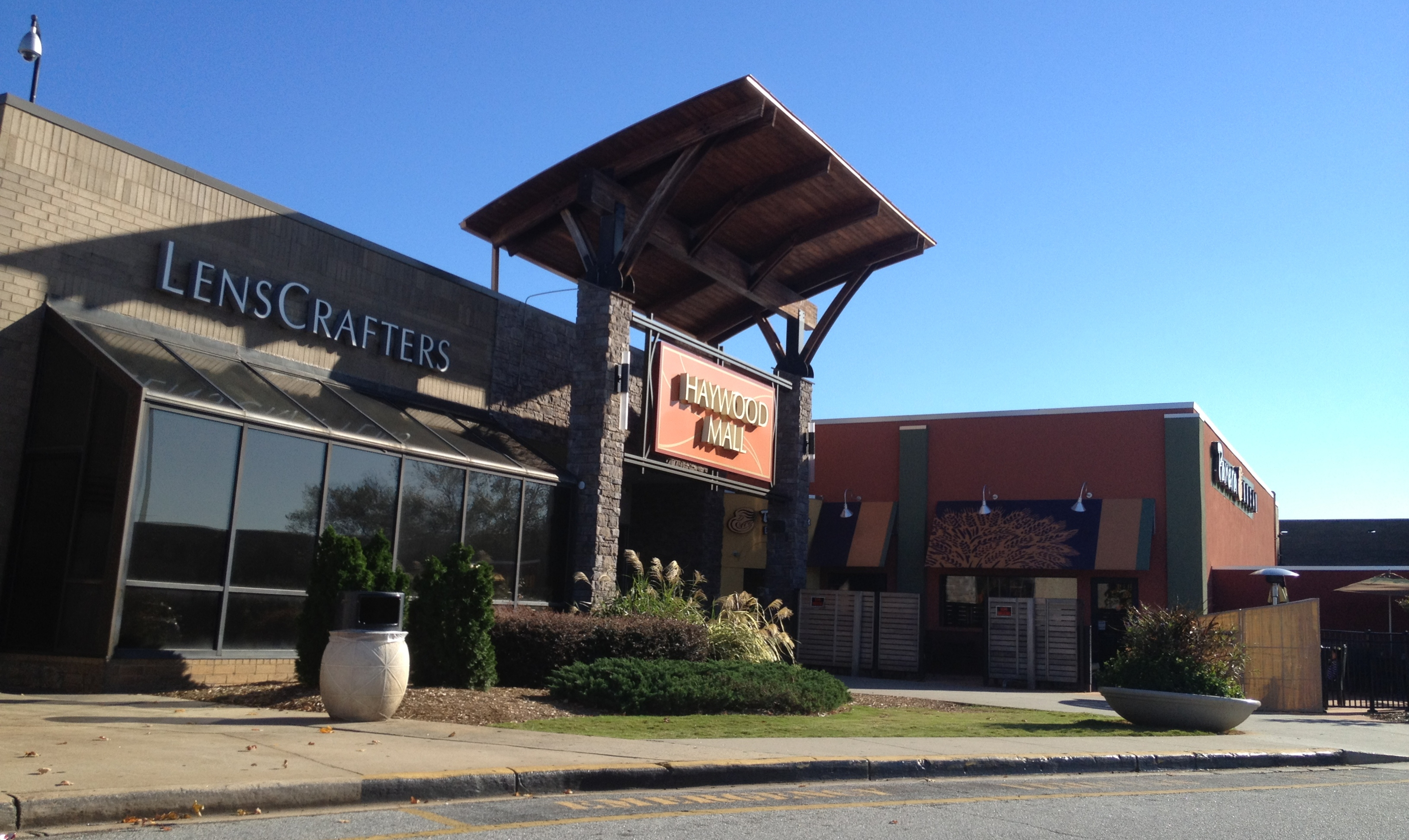
- Entrance to Haywood Mall, October 2012
- Location: Greenville, South Carolina, United States
- Coordinates: 34.85°N 82.333333°W
- Opened: July 30, 1980
- Developer: Haywood Mall Associates
- Manager: Simon Property Group
- Owner: Simon Property Group
- Num. of stores: 172
- Num. of anchor tenants: 6 (4 open, 2 under construction)
- Floor area: 1,237,411 sq ft (114,959.2 m^{2})
- Floors: 2 (3 in Dillard's)
- Website: www.simon.com/mall/haywood-mall

Haywood Mall is a shopping mall in Greenville, South Carolina, United States. The mall is the largest in the state, with 1,237,411 square feet (114,959.2 m^{2}) of retail space. The super-regional mall opened in 1980 at the intersection of Haywood Road and I-385/Golden Strip Freeway. Haywood's anchor stores are Belk (originally Belk Simpson), Dillard's, J. C. Penney, and Macy's (originally Rich's), with one anchor last occupied by Sears that is currently under construction to make way for two new tenants. A Primark store and a Round1 entertainment center is expected to open at the Haywood Mall in the former Sears in the future.

== History ==
Plans for Haywood Mall were first announced in 1978. Haywood Mall Associates, a joint venture of Cousins Properties and Monumental Properties announced that the mall would contain four anchor stores. The first three stores confirmed to be in the mall were J. C. Penney, Sears, and Rich's. At the time, both J. C. Penney and Sears had existing stores in Greenville, both of which would be closed in favor of the mall's stores, with the mall's targeted opening date being March 1980. The fourth anchor would be Belk-Simpson, who, similar to Sears and J. C. Penney, would relocate from a pre-existing store in downtown Greenville. In August 1979, Meyers-Arnold would also announce that they would be building a 20,000 square foot store at Haywood Mall, near the Sears.

Haywood Mall would open on July 30, 1980, with Belk-Simpson, Rich's, Sears, and J. C. Penney as anchors, as well as Meyers-Arnold as a junior anchor.

Meyers-Arnold would be bought and converted to Uptons in June 1987. However, Uptons would be short-lived, closing the Haywood Mall location on April 2, 1988. The vacant space would be reworked into a food court which opened in June 1989.

Dillard's would relocate their McAlister Square Mall location to Haywood Mall in 1995, resulting in the construction of a new wing leading to the new three-level store.

On February 6, 2020, Sears announced that it would close its store in Haywood Mall. The store closed in April 2020. Since the Sears has closed, the building has been leased to new tenants such as Primark and Round1 which are expected to open in 2026.
