= Greenville Downtown Airport =

Airport in Greenville County, South Carolina

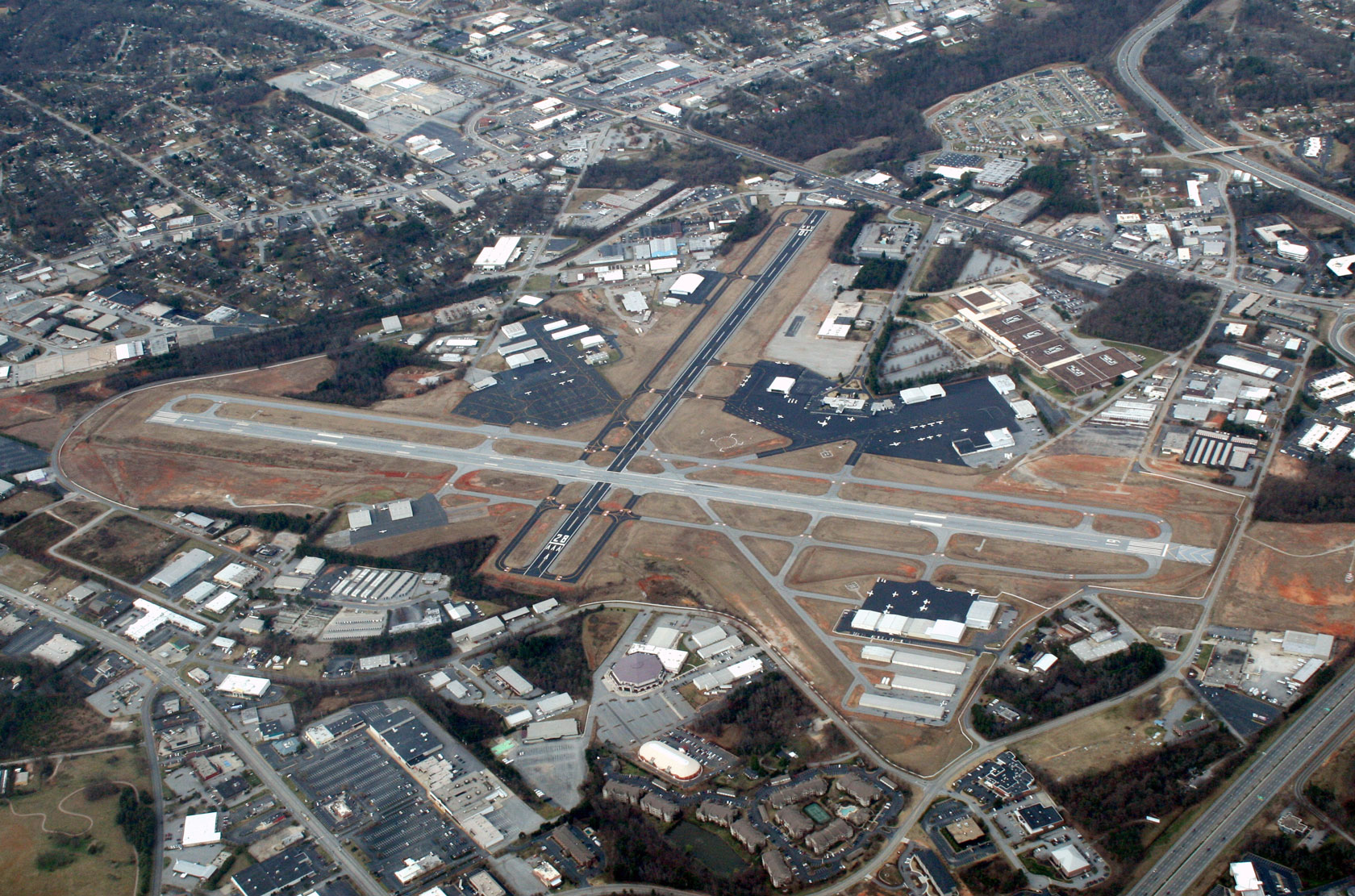
- IATA: GMU; ICAO: KGMU; FAA LID: GMU

Summary
- Airport type: Public
- Owner: Greenville Airport Commission
- Serves: Greenville, South Carolina
- Opened: 1928; 98 years ago
- Elevation AMSL: 1,048 ft (319 m)
- Coordinates: 34°50′53″N 82°21′00″W

Map
- Location in South Carolina

Runways
Direction	Length		Surface
Direction	ft	m	Surface
1/19	5,393	1,644	Asphalt
10/28	4,000	1,219	Asphalt

Helipads
Number	Length		Surface
Number	ft	m	Surface
H1	50	15	Concrete
H2	50	15	Concrete

Statistics (2022)
- Aircraft operations: 85,103
- Based aircraft: 200
- Source: Federal Aviation Administration

Greenville Downtown Airport (IATA: GMU, ICAO: KGMU, FAA LID: GMU) is an airport in Greenville, South Carolina, United States, 3 miles (4.8 km) east of the city center. It is owned by the Greenville Airport Commission and is the busiest general aviation airport in South Carolina.

The National Plan of Integrated Airport Systems for 2011–2015 categorized it as a general aviation facility.

== History ==
GMU opened in 1928 as Greenville Municipal Airport. In 1930 it received its first airmail flight. Amelia Earhart flew demonstration flights at GMU in an Autogiro for the Beech-Nut Company in November 1931. Eastern Air Lines began scheduled flights in the late 1930s and Delta Air Lines arrived in 1945.

During World War II the United States Army Air Forces used the airfield for training. The airport was used jointly by the Army Air Forces Flying Training Command, Southeast Training Center (later Eastern Flying Training Command) as a contract glider training school, operated by Southern Airways, Inc. The 19th AAF Glider Training Detachment was a Basic training school active from September 1942 until March 1943 using Aeronca TG-5 and Laister-Kauffmann TG-4A training gliders. The airport was then reassigned to Air Technical Service Command and used as a supply and maintenance depot until being returned to full civil control in October 1945.

Until 1962 GMU (then GRL) was the commercial airport for the Greenville area; in April 1957 it had 13 weekday departures on Eastern, four on Delta and four on Southern. Eastern had one nonstop to Richmond, but no other nonstops out of Greenville exceeded 200 miles.

Commercial service moved to Greenville–Spartanburg International Airport when it opened on October 15, 1962.

On October 20, 1977, a Convair CV-240 aircraft carrying members of the band Lynyrd Skynyrd departed from this airport. The plane crashed later, killing multiple members of the band, as well as the pilot and co-pilot.

The airport's history webpage notes that the current terminal was built in 1953 and fully renovated in 1991, "winning a national award".

== Facilities ==
Greenville Downtown Airport covers 385 acres (156 ha) at an elevation of 1,048 feet (319 m). It has two asphalt runways: 1/19 is 5,393 by 100 feet (1,644 x 30 m) and 10/28 is 4,000 by 80 feet (1,219 x 24 m). It has two helipads, each concrete 50 by 50 feet (15 x 15 m).

The Airport Commission recently completed extensive runway, taxiway, and apron improvements, a major terminal renovation, and construction of a new road that made additional land available for development.

Various companies at GMU provide aviation services. The airport hosts five flight schools including CAVU Flight School and ATP Flight School. Other companies provide aircraft rental, aircraft maintenance, helicopter services, aircraft management, fuel service, aircraft sales, air charter and air taxi services.

GMU has a restaurant, the Runway Cafe, and a public park where people can learn about aviation. The restaurant was featured in an episode of the TV show Restaurant: Impossible, with initial filming in October 2022 and an original air date in February 2023.

In the year ending December 31, 2022, the airport had 85,103 aircraft operations, average 233 per day: 81% general aviation, 17% air taxi, and 1% military. 200 aircraft at that time were based at this airport: 155 single-engine, 23 multi-engine, 17 jet, and 5 helicopter. It is located south of Interstate 385 and east of North Pleasantburg Drive in Greenville.

== Governance ==
The Greenville Downtown Airport is governed by a five-person appointed commission authorized by Act 919. Two appointees each from city and county councils, and one at-large, serve staggered three-year terms.

== Economic impact ==
The South Carolina Statewide Aviation System Plan & Economic Impact Report released in 2018 concluded that in 2017 the Greenville Downtown Airport (GMU) had a significant annual economic impact on the state of South Carolina and our local region. They determined that GMU had the following direct and indirect/induced economic impact:

- Employment: 547
- Payroll: $24.9 million
- Economic activity: $68.8 million

== Air traffic ==
As of 2017, GMU's general aviation operations traffic (local and itinerant) was heavier than any other general aviation airport in South Carolina. Its total operations in 2017 were topped by only three commercial airports (Myrtle Beach International, Charleston International/Air Force Base and Columbia Metropolitan) in South Carolina.

== Based aircraft ==
GMU has more based aircraft than any other airport in South Carolina.

== Awards ==
The FAA Southern Region selected GMU to receive its General Aviation Airport Safety Award. The award is presented to a general aviation airport in the Southeast that makes outstanding efforts to increase flight safety. GMU accomplished this by completing numerous safety-enhancing projects. Of particular note, GMU was the first general aviation airport in the nation to install an Engineered Material Arresting System (EMAS) in the latter part of 2003. EMAS rapidly and safely decelerates aircraft that have overrun the active runway by utilizing energy absorbing material. In the summer of 2006, this system was credited with saving five passengers and a $20 million Falcon 900 jet that overran Runway 1 due to a brake malfunction.

The FAA Southern Region selected Joe Frasher, Airport Director of GMU, as the 2008 General Aviation Airport Manager of the Year. This award is presented to a general aviation airport manager in the Southeast who makes outstanding efforts to increase flight safety. Frasher had been instrumental in completing numerous safety-enhancing projects at GMU over the previous 26 years.

"The staff of the Greenville Downtown Airport is distinguished in its commitment to continually increasing flight safety," said Rusty Chapman, recently retired Manager of the Airports Division, FAA Southern Region. "They accomplished a significant number of safety upgrades while still successfully operating the state's busiest general aviation airport."

The award was presented to Frasher at the 2009 FAA Communications Conference in Atlanta on January 30, 2009.

== See also ==
- New Year's Day March
- South Carolina World War II Army Airfields
- 29th Flying Training Wing (World War II)
- List of airports in South Carolina
