= McAlister Square =

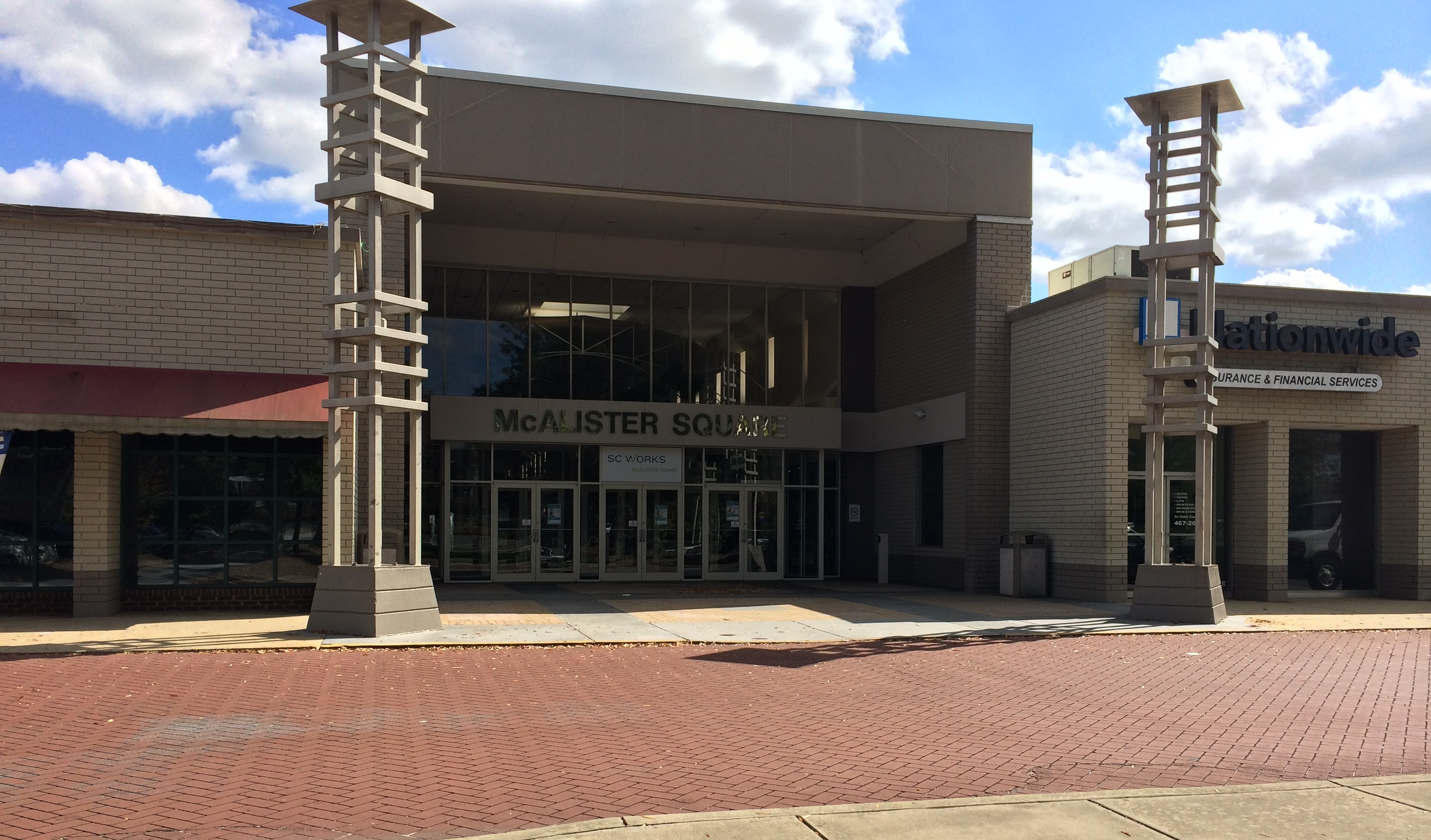
- Entrance to McAlister Square, October 2014
- Location: Greenville, South Carolina, United States
- Coordinates: 34.8384°N 82.3631°W
- Opened: March 25, 1968
- Developer: E. M. "Ned" Apperson
- Num. of anchor tenants: 3 (former)
- Floor area: 500,000 sq ft (46,000 m^{2})
- Floors: 1 (anchors had 2)

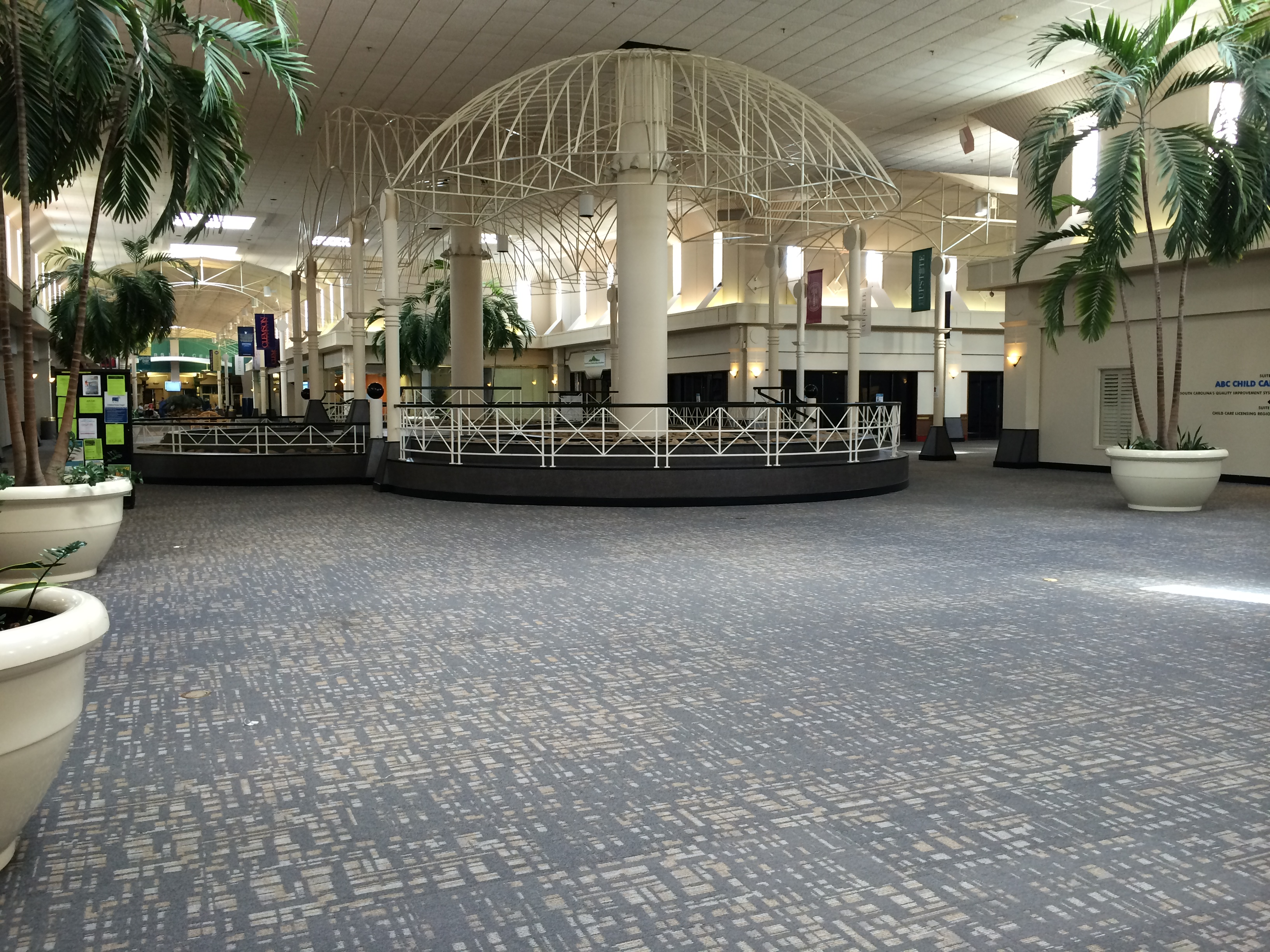
Interior view of McAlister Square, October 2014

McAlister Square is an American repositioned shopping mall in Greenville, South Carolina. It is notable for being the first enclosed shopping center in South Carolina, and the largest shopping center in the state at the time it was built. It is now a hybrid property, with the largest tenant being the University Center of Greenville.

== History ==
The mall was first announced in December 1965. Construction of the mall began in June 1967, with what was termed "Phase One" of the mall, with anchors Meyers-Arnold (63,000 sq ft) and Ivey's (60,000 sq ft) and 245,000 sq ft of interior space and an opening date of early 1968. "Phase Two", also announced at this time, was to include a third anchor, a "convenience center", and a theater, for a total of 600,000 sq ft of space by 1970. Meyers-Arnold and Ivey's opened on February 15, 1968, with completion of the mall anticipated for March 18, for a March 25 opening. At this time, a majority of tenants had been announced, including junior anchors S. H. Kress & Co. and Walgreens Drug. A Belk-Simpson department store was added in 1974, bringing the mall to approximately 500,000 square feet (46,000 m^{2}) of leasable space. A Winn-Dixie grocery store, movie theater and bank branch were outparcels.

== Decline ==
In 1990, the Ivey's store was converted into a Dillard's, and the store closed in 1995, when Dillard's relocated to Haywood Mall. Belk-Simpson would announce their closure in October 1998, and would close in January 1999. The Uptons anchor, which had replaced the Meyers-Arnold store, closed shortly thereafter.

== Current use ==
The mall is owned by the Greenville Tech Foundation and houses a variety of non-profit and educational businesses, with the largest tenant being The University Center of Greenville. While no space in the main mall continues to be used as retail space, the mall is filled with a plethora of non-profit organizations and businesses. Some of the current tenants include: Thrive Upstate, Greenville Literacy Association, Public Education Partners, Urban League of the Upstate and SC Works. Outparcels include a Publix grocery store, the Camelot movie theater, a Truist bank branch and other retailers. South Carolina's first freestanding Chick-fil-A, which opened in the 1990s when the mall also had a Chick-fil-A at center court, is still in business along Laurens Road. The mall has been repainted and re-landscaped since its transformation into a mixed-use center.
