= Carolina First Center =

Building in South Carolina

Coordinates: 32°47′22″N 79°55′46″W

Carolina First Center was the name given to the five-story office building located at 40 Calhoun Street in Charleston, South Carolina while it housed Carolina First Bank's south coast main offices. It was previously named Charleston Gateway Center and reverted to that name sometime after Carolina First was purchased by TD Bank, N.A. on October 1, 2010.

It was also a name given to the former Palmetto Expo Center, a convention center in Greenville, South Carolina. After the purchase of Carolina First, it was renamed Greenville Convention Center.

Carolina First Center was also the original name to be given to a new athletic center at the College of Charleston for which the bank has naming rights. To avoid confusion with the other two buildings of the same name, the facility was renamed Carolina First Arena. It opened in November 2008. After the purchase of Carolina First, it was renamed TD Arena.
