= Gantt, South Carolina =

- Census-designated place
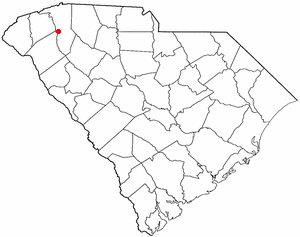
- Location of Gantt, South Carolina
- Coordinates: 34°46′55″N 82°23′53″W
- Country: United States
- State: South Carolina
- County: Greenville

Area
  - Total: 9.80 sq mi (25.39 km^{2})
  - Land: 9.78 sq mi (25.34 km^{2})
  - Water: 0.015 sq mi (0.04 km^{2})
- Elevation: 958 ft (292 m)

Population (2020)
  - Total: 15,006
  - Density: 1,533.5/sq mi (592.08/km^{2})
- Time zone: UTC−5 (Eastern (EST))
  - Summer (DST): UTC−4 (EDT)
- FIPS code: 45-28375
- GNIS feature ID: 2402514

Gantt is a census-designated place (CDP) in Greenville County, South Carolina, United States. The population was 14,229 at the 2010 census. It is part of the Greenville-Mauldin-Easley metropolitan area and a suburb of the city of Greenville.

== Geography ==
Gantt is located in west-central Greenville County. It is bordered to the northeast by the city of Greenville and to the northwest by unincorporated Dunean.

Interstate 85 passes through the center of the community, with access from exits 44 through 46. I-85 leads northeast 30 miles (48 km) to Spartanburg and southwest 140 miles (230 km) to Atlanta. U.S. Route 25 passes through Gantt as White Horse Road, intersecting I-85 at Exit 44. US 25 leads north 6 miles (10 km) to Parker, a western suburb of Greenville, and south 46 miles (74 km) to Greenwood. Downtown Greenville is 6 miles to the north via US 25 and US 29.

According to the United States Census Bureau, the Gantt CDP has a total area of 9.9 square miles (25.7 km^{2}), of which 0.02 square miles (0.04 km^{2}), or 0.16%, are water.

== Demographics ==
Historical population
Census	Pop.	Note	%±
2000	13,962		—
2010	14,229		1.9%
2020	15,006		5.5%
U.S. Decennial Census

=== Racial and ethnic composition ===
Gantt CDP, South Carolina – Racial and ethnic composition Note: the US Census treats Hispanic/Latino as an ethnic category. This table excludes Latinos from the racial categories and assigns them to a separate category. Hispanics/Latinos may be of any race.
Race / Ethnicity (NH = Non-Hispanic)	Pop 2000	Pop 2010	Pop 2020	% 2000	% 2010	% 2020
White alone (NH)	4,564	3,756	3,702	32.69%	26.40%	24.67%
Black or African American alone (NH)	8,776	8,359	7,529	62.86%	58.75%	50.17%
Native American or Alaska Native alone (NH)	17	24	16	0.12%	0.17%	0.11%
Asian alone (NH)	47	32	35	0.34%	0.22%	0.23%
Native Hawaiian or Pacific Islander alone (NH)	1	4	7	0.01%	0.03%	0.05%
Other race alone (NH)	14	11	68	0.10%	0.08%	0.45%
Mixed race or Multiracial (NH)	124	166	431	0.89%	1.17%	2.87%
Hispanic or Latino (any race)	419	1,877	3,218	3.00%	13.19%	21.44%
Total	13,962	14,229	15,006	100.00%	100.00%	100.00%

=== 2020 census ===
As of the 2020 census, there were 15,006 people in Gantt. There were 5,749 households, including 3,488 families.

The median age was 37.3 years. 25.2% of residents were under the age of 18 and 16.8% were 65 years of age or older. For every 100 females there were 90.7 males, and for every 100 females age 18 and over there were 87.0 males age 18 and over.

98.7% of residents lived in urban areas, while 1.3% lived in rural areas.

Of all households, 34.1% had children under the age of 18 living in them. 35.1% were married-couple households, 20.0% were households with a male householder and no spouse or partner present, and 37.0% were households with a female householder and no spouse or partner present. About 27.0% of all households were made up of individuals, and 10.7% had someone living alone who was 65 years of age or older.

There were 6,188 housing units, of which 7.1% were vacant. The homeowner vacancy rate was 1.2% and the rental vacancy rate was 6.8%.

=== 2000 census ===
At the 2000 census there were 13,962 people, 5,361 households, and 3,854 families living in the CDP. The population density was 1,387.5 inhabitants per square mile (535.7/km^{2}). There were 5,793 housing units at an average density of 575.7 per square mile (222.3/km^{2}). The racial makeup of the CDP was 33.86% White, 63.10% African American, 0.14% Native American, 0.34% Asian, 0.05% Pacific Islander, 1.40% from other races, and 1.10% from two or more races. Hispanic or Latino of any race were 3.00%.

Of the 5,361 households 33.5% had children under the age of 18 living with them, 42.6% were married couples living together, 23.4% had a female householder with no husband present, and 28.1% were non-families. 24.1% of households were one person and 6.9% were one person aged 65 or older. The average household size was 2.60 and the average family size was 3.07.

The age distribution was 27.6% under the age of 18, 8.4% from 18 to 24, 28.8% from 25 to 44, 24.0% from 45 to 64, and 11.2% 65 or older. The median age was 36 years. For every 100 females, there were 89.7 males. For every 100 females age 18 and over, there were 84.3 males.

The median household income was $33,811 and the median family income was $39,280. Males had a median income of $31,184 versus $22,028 for females. The per capita income for the CDP was $20,106. About 11.7% of families and 13.9% of the population were below the poverty line, including 18.7% of those under age 18 and 12.1% of those age 65 or over.
