= Upstate South Carolina =

Coordinates: 34°43′N 82°11′W

Greenville–Spartanburg Metropolitan Area
- CSA
- Greenville–Spartanburg–Anderson, SC; Combined Statistical Area
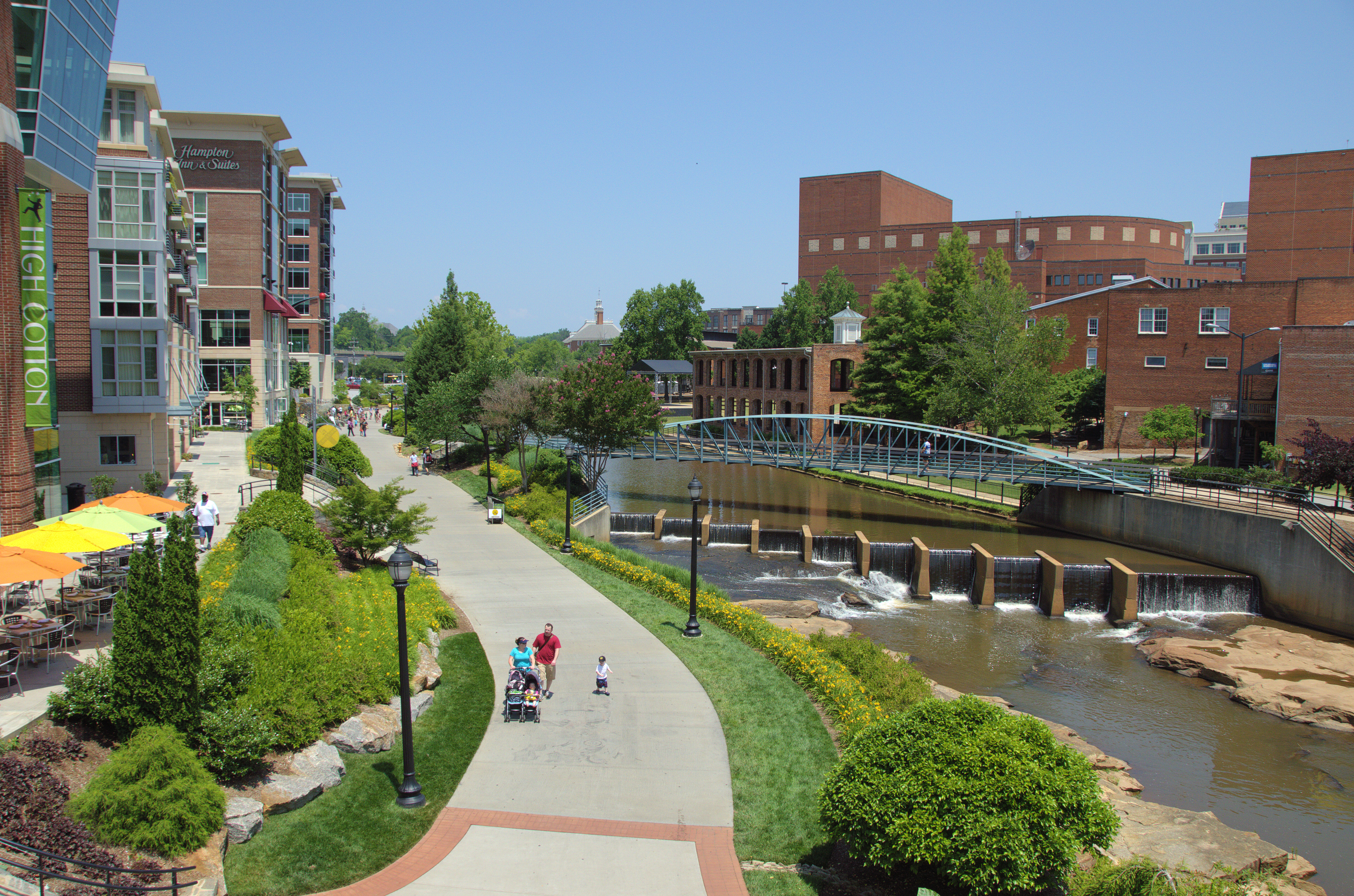
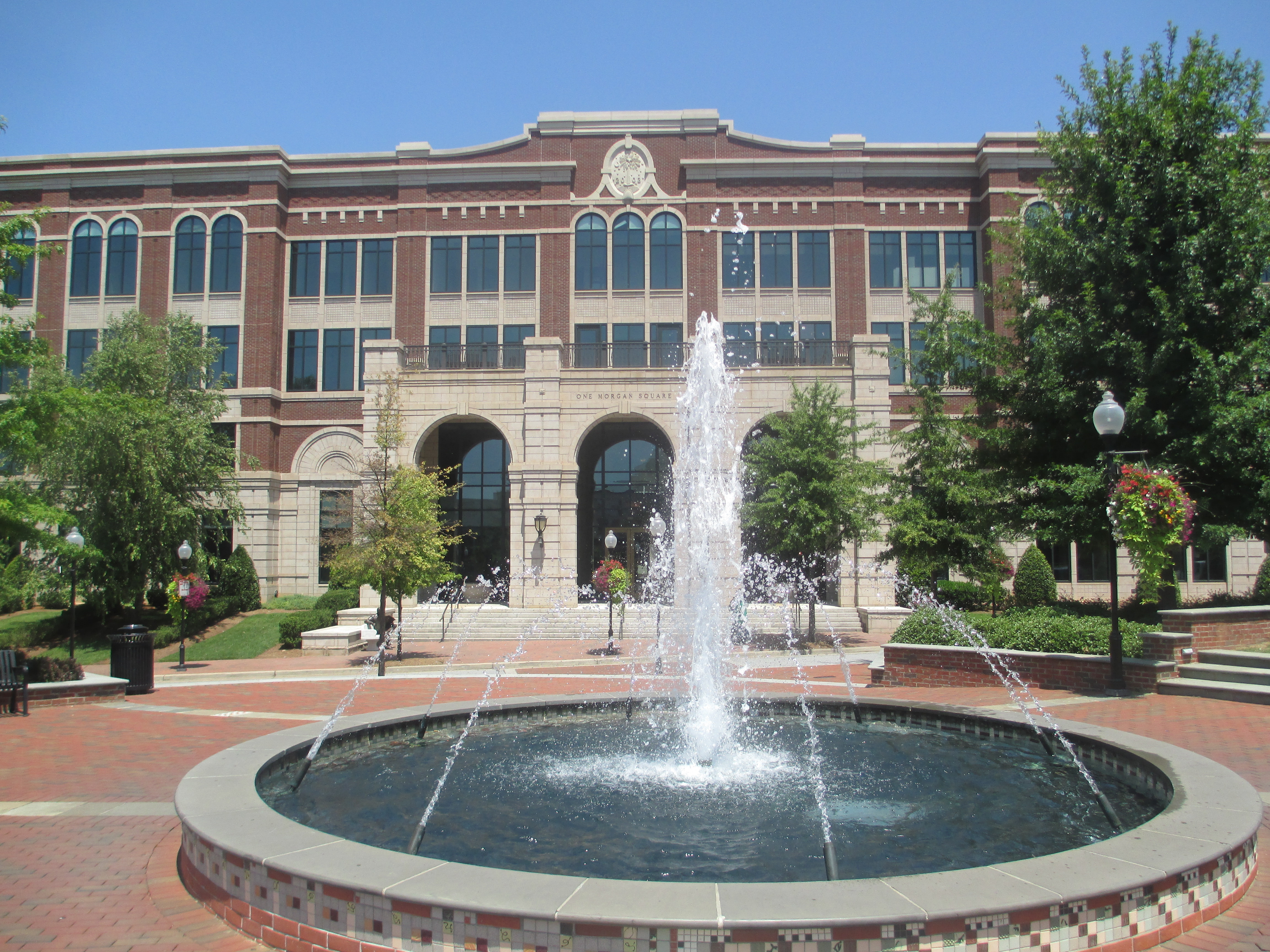
- Greenville Spartanburg
Map of Greenville–Spartanburg–Anderson, SC CSA
City of Greenville
City of Spartanburg
City of Anderson
Greenville–Anderson–Greer, SC MSA
Spartanburg, SC MSA
Greenwood, SC μSA
Seneca, SC μSA
Gaffney, SC μSA
- Country: United States
- State: South Carolina
- Principal cities: Greenville; Spartanburg; Anderson; Mauldin; Easley; Clemson; Gaffney; Greer; Greenwood; Seneca

Area
  - Total: 6,168 sq mi (15,980 km^{2})
  - Land: 6,008 sq mi (15,560 km^{2})
  - Water: 141 sq mi (370 km^{2}) 2.2%

Population (2020)
  - CSA: 1,487,610 (39th)

GDP
  - MSA: $57.403 billion (2022)
  - CSA: $76.888 billion (2022)
- Time zone: UTC−5 (EST)
  - Summer (DST): UTC−4 (EDT)
- Area codes: 864 and 821

The Upstate, historically known as the Upcountry, is a region of the U.S. state of South Carolina, comprising the northwesternmost area of the state. Although loosely defined among locals, the general definition includes the 10 counties of the commerce-rich I-85 corridor in the northwest corner of South Carolina. This definition coincided with the Greenville-Spartanburg-Anderson, SC Combined Statistical Area, as first defined by the Office of Management and Budget (OMB) in 2015. In 2023, the OMB issued its most updated definition of the CSA that coincides again with the 10-county region.

The region's population was 1,487,610 as of 2020. Situated between Atlanta and Charlotte, the Upstate is the geographical center of the Charlanta megaregion. After BMW's initial investment, foreign companies, including others from Germany, have a substantial presence in the Upstate; several large corporations have established regional, national, or continental headquarters in the area. Greenville is the largest city in the region; it has a population of 72,227 and an urban-area population of 387,271, and it is the base of most commercial activity. Greer and Spartanburg are next in population.

== Counties ==
Ten counties are included in the Upstate of South Carolina: Greenville, Spartanburg, Anderson, Pickens, Oconee, Greenwood, Laurens, Cherokee, Union, Abbeville.

County	Seat	2025 estimate	2020 census	Change	Area	Density
Greenville	Greenville	583,125	525,534	+10.96%	796 sq mi (2,060 km^{2})	733/sq mi (283/km^{2})
Spartanburg	Spartanburg	380,857	327,997	+16.12%	820 sq mi (2,100 km^{2})	464/sq mi (179/km^{2})
Anderson	Anderson	219,930	203,718	+7.96%	756 sq mi (1,960 km^{2})	291/sq mi (112/km^{2})
Pickens	Pickens	139,198	131,404	+5.93%	513 sq mi (1,330 km^{2})	271/sq mi (105/km^{2})
Oconee	Walhalla	83,775	78,607	+6.57%	674 sq mi (1,750 km^{2})	124/sq mi (48/km^{2})
Laurens	Laurens	71,848	67,539	+6.38%	723 sq mi (1,870 km^{2})	99/sq mi (38/km^{2})
Greenwood	Greenwood	70,379	69,351	+1.48%	464 sq mi (1,200 km^{2})	152/sq mi (59/km^{2})
Cherokee	Gaffney	58,275	56,216	+3.66%	397 sq mi (1,030 km^{2})	147/sq mi (57/km^{2})
Union	Union	26,799	27,244	−1.63%	515 sq mi (1,330 km^{2})	52/sq mi (20/km^{2})
Abbeville	Abbeville	24,836	24,295	+2.23%	512 sq mi (1,330 km^{2})	49/sq mi (19/km^{2})
Total		1,659,022	1,511,905	+9.73%	6,170 sq mi (16,000 km^{2})	269/sq mi (104/km^{2})

== Metropolitan, micropolitan, and combined statistical areas ==
As of 2023, the Greenville–Spartanburg–Anderson CSA includes all ten counties in the Upstate. Within the CSA are a total of two metropolitan statistical areas and three micropolitan statistical areas.

As of the 2020 Census, the Greenville–Spartanburg–Anderson CSA had a population of 1,511,105.

MSA	County	Population (2020)
Greenville–Anderson–Greer	Greenville, Anderson, Pickens, Laurens	928,195
Spartanburg	Spartanburg, Union	355,241
	Total:	1,283,436

μSA	County	Population (2020)
Seneca	Oconee	78,607
Greenwood	Greenwood, Abbeville	93,646
Gaffney	Cherokee	56,216
	Total:	228,469

== Communities ==
The following population rankings are based on the 2010 Census.

=== Primary cities ===
Greenville, Spartanburg, Anderson, Greer, Mauldin, and Greenwood,

The OMB labels all these cities as principal cities in their respective MSAs and μSA.

=== Other communities with more than 20,000 residents ===
Cities: Easley, Simpsonville

CDPs: Taylors, Wade Hampton

=== Communities with more than 10,000 residents ===
Cities: Clemson, Gaffney, and Fountain Inn, South Carolina.

Gaffney is a principal city in its μSA. If students from Clemson University are included, Clemson has close to 30,000 residents.

CDP's: Berea, Five Forks, Gantt, Parker, Boiling Springs

=== Communities with fewer than 10,000 residents ===
Communities in the Upstate with under 10,000 residents include:

Cities:

- Abbeville
- Belton
- Chesnee
- Clinton
- Inman
- Landrum
- Laurens
- Liberty
- Pickens
- Seneca
- Travelers Rest
- Union
- Walhalla
- Wellford
- Westminster
- Woodruff

Towns:

- Blacksburg
- Calhoun Falls
- Campobello
- Carlisle
- Central
- Central Pacolet
- Cowpens
- Cross Hill
- Donalds
- Due West
- Duncan
- Gray Court
- Hodges
- Honea Path
- Iva
- Jonesville
- Lockhart
- Lowndesville
- Lyman
- Ninety Six
- Norris
- Pacolet
- Pelzer
- Pendleton
- Reidville
- Salem
- Six Mile
- Starr
- Troy
- Ware Shoals
- Waterloo
- West Union
- West Pelzer
- Williamston

Seneca is a principal city in its μSA. According to the 2010 Census, no town in the Upstate has a population greater than 6000.

CDPs:

- Antreville
- Arcadia
- Arial
- Bradley
- Buffalo
- Centerville
- City View
- Clifton
- Cokesbury
- Converse
- Coronaca
- Cross Anchor
- Dunean
- East Gaffney
- Enoree
- Fair Play
- Fairforest
- Fingerville
- Glendale
- Golden Grove
- Gramling
- Homeland Park
- Inman Mills
- Joanna
- Judson
- Lake Secession
- Mayo
- Monarch Mill
- Mountville
- Newry
- Northlake
- Piedmont
- Powdersville
- Princeton
- Promised Land
- Roebuck
- Sans Souci
- Saxon
- Slater-Marietta
- Southern Shops
- Startex
- Tigerville
- Utica
- Valley Falls
- Ware Place
- Watts Mills
- Welcome

== Institutions of higher education ==
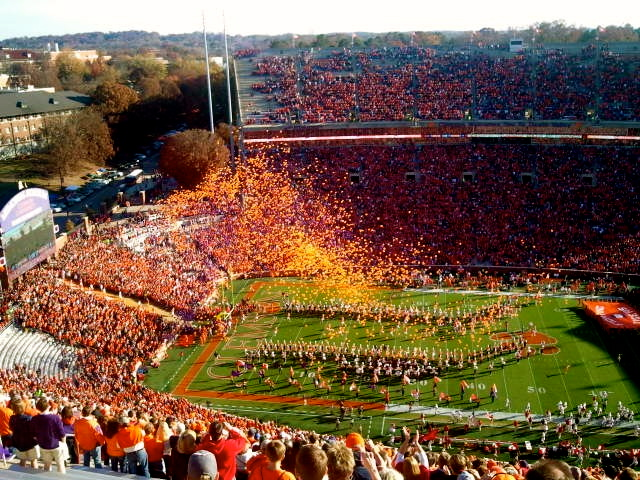
Clemson University Memorial Stadium

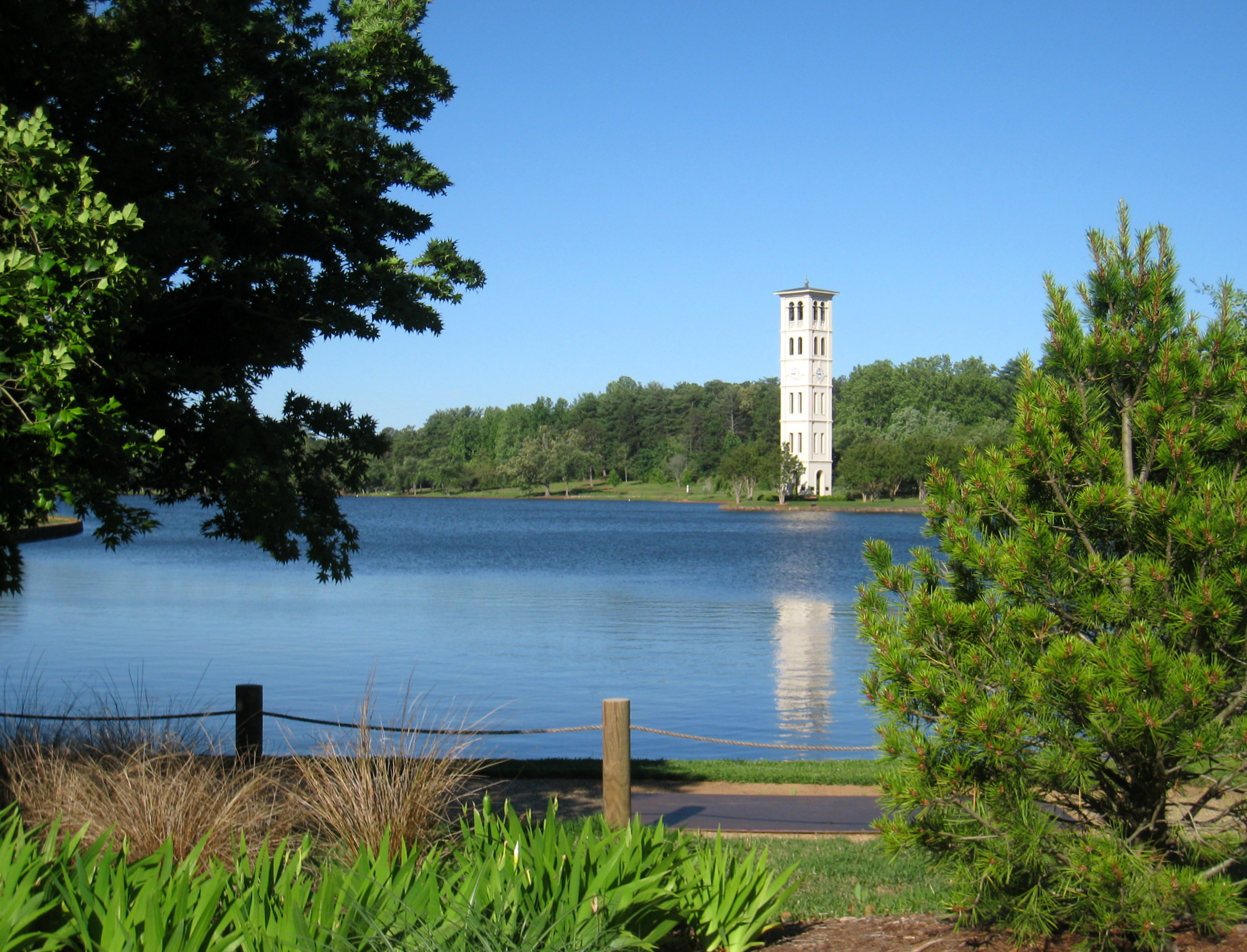
Furman University Belltower

The following table shows the major institutions of higher education in the Upstate.

Name	Type	Enrollment
Anderson University	Private Senior	2,000
Bob Jones University	Private Senior	5,000
Clemson University	Public Senior	25,822
Converse College	Private Senior	1,938
Edward Via College of Osteopathic Medicine – Carolinas	Private Professional	600
Erskine College	Private Senior	750
Furman University	Private Senior	2,660
Greenville Technical College	Public Technical	14,338
Greenville Presbyterian Theological Seminary	Private Professional	
Lander University	Public Senior	3,000
Limestone College	Private Senior	3,000
North Greenville University	Private Senior	2,071
Piedmont Technical College	Public Technical	4,600
Presbyterian College	Private Senior	1,200
Sherman College of Chiropractic	Private Professional	200
Southern Wesleyan University	Private Senior	2,414
Spartanburg Methodist College	Private Senior	1,025
Spartanburg Community College	Public Technical	4,300
Tri-County Technical College	Public Technical	6,000
University Center – Greenville	Public Two-Year	N/A
University of South Carolina School of Medicine – Greenville	Public Professional	400
University of South Carolina-Upstate	Public Senior	4,851
University of South Carolina-Union	Public Two-Year	363
Wofford College	Private Senior	1,600

In 2008, U.S. News ranked Furman as the 37th-best liberal arts college, Wofford College as the 59th-best, and Presbyterian College as the 101st-best. Also, they ranked Clemson University as the 67th-best national university. According to the Bob Jones University, its Museum and Gallery constitutes the largest collection of religious art in the Western Hemisphere.

== Economy ==
The majority of business and commerce in the Upstate takes place in Greenville County. Greenville has the largest concentration of businesses and financial institutions in its downtown area. In fact, the Greenville-Spartanburg-Anderson MSA was ranked seventh in the nation by site consultants considering the top markets for economic development. Many financial institutions have regional offices located in downtown Greenville. These include Bank of America and the now-defunct Wachovia. Other major industries of commerce in the Upstate include the auto industry, which is concentrated mainly along the corridor between Greenville and Spartanburg around the BMW manufacturing facility in Greer.

The other major industry in the Upstate is the healthcare and pharmaceuticals. Greenville Hospital System and Bon Secours St. Francis Health System are the area's largest in the healthcare sector, while the pharmaceutical corporation of Bausch & Lomb has set up regional operations alongside smaller recently developed local companies such as IRIX Manufacturing and Pharmaceutical Associates. The Upstate is also home to a large amount of private-sector and university-based research activity, including R&D facilities for Michelin, Fuji, and GE Vernova and research centers to support the automotive, life sciences, plastics, and photonics industries. Clemson University, BMW, IBM, Microsoft, and Michelin have combined their resources to create Clemson University International Center for Automotive Research, a research park that specializes in the development of automotive technology.

=== Corporations based in or with a major presence in the Upstate ===
These corporations have a major presence in the Upstate: Adidas, Advance America, Bank of America, BMW of North America, Bon Secours St. Francis Health System Bon Secours | Bringing Health Care and Good Help to Those in Need, Bosch North America, Denny's Restaurants, Dunlop Sport, Ernst & Young, Fluor Corporation, Freightliner, GE Vernova, Prisma Health , IBM, Kemet Corporation, Liberty Corporation, Spartanburg Regional Healthcare System, Michelin of North America, Microsoft, Milliken & Company, Spartanburg Regional Health System, Spectrum Communications, SunTrust, Ovation Brands, Perrigo Company of South Carolina, Techtronic Industries, Toronto-Dominion Bank, United Community and Verizon.

• BMW's only North American manufacturing plant is located in Spartanburg County, with an investment of $3.7 billion.

• Fujifilm located their first manufacturing facility in the U.S. in Greenwood County.

• Michelin North America's headquarters is located in Greenville, along with seven manufacturing plants, R&D facility, and test track located in the Upstate. Michelin employs more than 7,800 in South Carolina.

• Walgreens has their southeastern distribution center located in Anderson County, which employs mentally disabled workers as nearly 40% of their workforce.

== Transportation ==
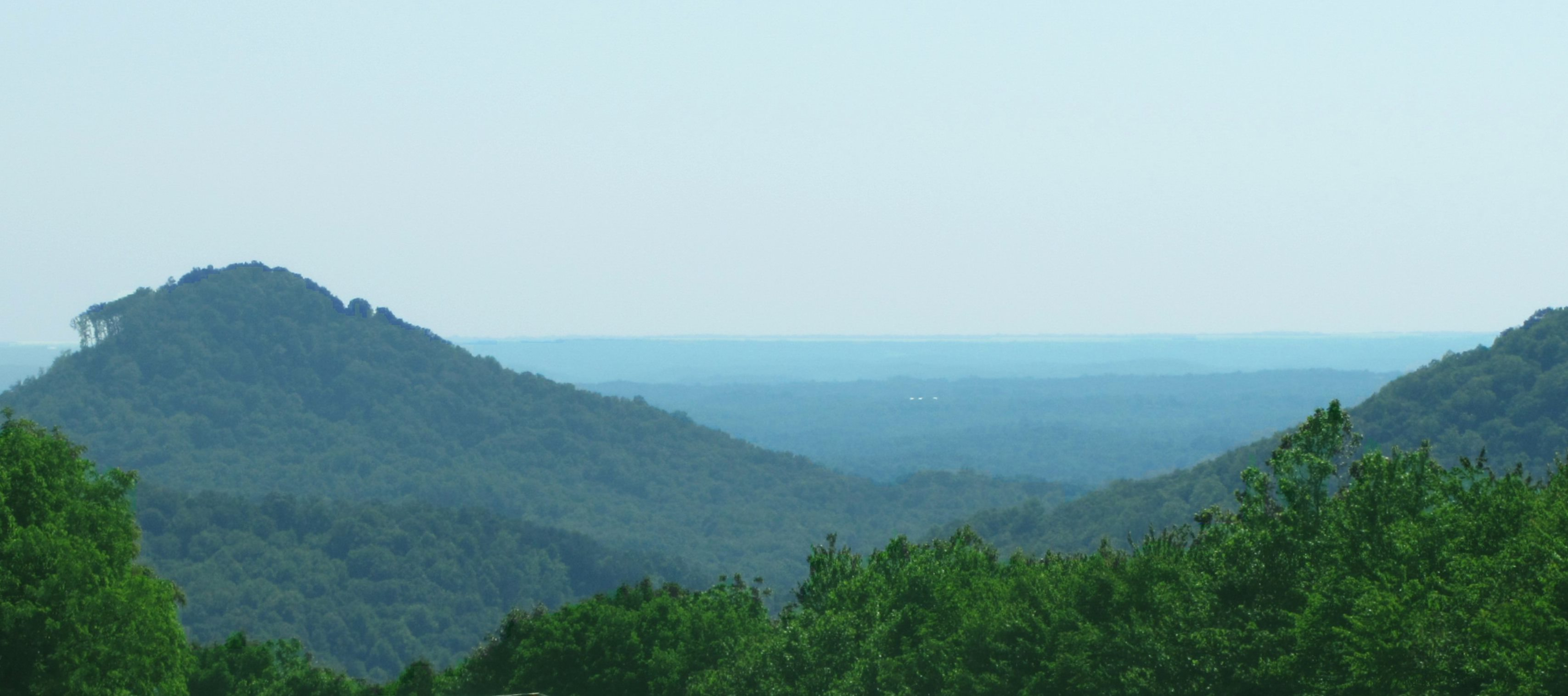
View of the Upcountry on I-26 from Polk County, NC, a short distance from the state line.

The Upstate is served by two major interstate highways, I-85 and I-26. Other major interstate spurs include I-185, I-385, and I-585. The major airport in the region is Greenville-Spartanburg International Airport, located nearly halfway between Greenville and Spartanburg in suburban Greer. Greenville, Spartanburg, Anderson, Clemson, Pickens, Union, and Gaffney each have smaller airfields. Amtrak service along the Crescent Line stops in Spartanburg, Greenville, and Clemson.

== Media ==
The Upstate region is served by three regional newspapers: The Greenville News, the (Spartanburg) Herald-Journal, and the Anderson Independent-Mail, each of which serves its individual city and surrounding area. The Post and Courier recently opened expansion newsrooms in Greenville and Spartanburg for coverage of the Upstate, including Clemson.

The Upstate is part of the vastly larger Greenville-Spartanburg-Anderson-Asheville designated market area, which extends into western North Carolina and northeastern Georgia. These television stations serve the region:

- WYFF Channel 4 – Greenville (NBC)
- WSPA-TV Channel 7 – Spartanburg (CBS)
- WLOS-TV Channel 13 – Asheville, North Carolina (ABC)
- WGGS-TV Channel 16 – Greenville (TBN)
- WHNS Channel 21 – Greenville (Fox)
- WNTV Channel 29 – Greenville (SCETV)
- WUNF-TV Channel 33 – Asheville (UNC-TV)
- WMYA-TV Channel 40 – Anderson (MNTV)
- WYCW Channel 62 – Asheville (CW)

== See also ==
- Cedar Falls Park
- South Carolina statistical areas
- Piedmont Atlantic
- SC-NC-VA Tornado Outbreak
- List of Appalachian Regional Commission counties#South Carolina
- South Carolina Lowcountry
- Midlands of South Carolina
- Bibliography of South Carolina history
