= Alice Buck Norwood Spearman Wright =

American activist (1902–1989)

- Born: March 12, 1902; Marion, South Carolina
- Died: March 12, 1989 (aged 87); Columbia, South Carolina
- Education: Teachers College, Columbia University

Alice Buck Norwood Spearman Wright (March 12, 1902 - March 12, 1989) was an American liberal feminist advocating for human relations. From 1954 to 1967, she served as the executive director of the South Carolina Council on Human Relations, which was an affiliate of the South Carolina Division of the Southern Regional Council (SRC). She directed the council to participate in the Voter Education Project, which helped to promote compliance with the Civil Rights Act of 1964.

== Early life and education ==
Spearman was born on March 12, 1902, in Marion, South Carolina, to Samuel Wilkins Norwood, a well known South Carolina banker and Albertine Buck, the granddaughter of one of South Carolina's largest slave owners. Spearman attended private and public schools in Marion, South Carolina and studied at Converse College, where she earned a bachelor of arts degree in history and literature in 1923. After graduating from the college, Spearman taught school in South Carolina before moving to New York City in 1926, where she earned a master's degree in religious education from Teachers College, Columbia University.

She was a member of the Young Women’s Christian Association, where she practiced her Baptist religious beliefs through social service. Spearman took courses at the YWCA National Training School and Union Theological Seminary, and worked for the YWCA in Germantown, Pennsylvania. After attending an international student conference in Oxford, England, Spearman began a solo trip around the world. She studied Asian culture in Japan and travelled to the Soviet Union, and India. In India Spearman saw Mahatma Gandhi leading a protest march in Delhi, and she was inspired by his example to engage in social reform. Having spent three years teaching English in Peking, China, she returned to Marion to help care for her ailing father.

== Early career ==
Spearman was the first woman ever appointed as a relief director in Marion County, where she set up relief for textile workers in the United Textile Workers of America strike in 1934. In 1935, she married Eugene H. Spearman Sr., whom she worked with. Because the Employment Act of 1932 prohibited both spouses from being federal employees, Spearman quit her job and moved to her husband's farm in Newberry, South Carolina. In 1951, because of her husband's declining health and financial problems, Spearman sought a full-time position as an executive secretary of the South Carolina Federation of Women's Clubs (SCFWC) and as an associate editor of the Clubwoman magazine.

== Anti-segregation efforts ==
In October 1954, Spearman became the first director of the South Carolina Council on Human Relations. She was the first woman to be appointed to the Governor's Council by Governaor McNair. In the aftermath of the Supreme Court’s decision in Brown v. Board of Education, she devoted much of her efforts in desegregation. She attempted to reach out to various white women's organizations and encouraged them to understand the racial injustice facing society. Because Spearman believed the idea that privileges bring responsibilities, her central philosophy focused on pushing women to their limits at the time women were largely excluded by social movements. Additionally, she also served as a bridge between the progressive women members of the Southern Regional Council (SRC), where she tested her innovative ideas. By telephone and mail, she contacted owners of industrial plants and businesses to urge them to hire African Americans. Often working 18-hour days, she and her staff received frequent threats. She said that it was difficult to keep office staff because they feared for their safety.

In 1959, under Spearman’s leadership, the SRC launched several initiatives, including the student sit-ins and lunch-counter demonstrations of the desegregation movement. During the years of initial desegregation, Spearman mentored both African American and white students associated with the SCCHR Student Council. For University of South Carolina students Dan T. Clark, Charles Joyner, and M. Hayes Mizzell, the biracial student council, office meetings, and weekend seminars at the Penn Center with Spearman and Leaden were defining events in their lives.[5] Spearman and her council also worked to create educational and economic opportunities for black South Carolinians. Through her lobbying efforts, in 1963, the University of South Carolina admitted three African-American students. Under Spearman’s leadership, the South Carolina Council, chartered independently of the Southern Regional Council in 1963, joined the Voter Education Project (VEP) and participated in programs addressing issues regarding illiteracy, job opportunities, and poverty in rural South Carolina. In 1964 Morris College conferred on her an honorary doctorate.

Spearman's wide experience with African American civil rights organizations culminated in her introducing Martin Luther King Jr. on Sunday, May 8, 1966, to a statewide mass meeting, cosponsored by the South Carolina Voter Education Project, the Williamsburg Voters League, and CORE, in Kingstree, one of the state's most racially troubled towns. [5] Spearman was the director of the SRC council until 1967 where she dedicated her efforts to fostering a biracial community grounded in the pursuit of social justice.

== Later life and death ==
In March 1970, Spearman married Marion Wright, with whom she had forged an enduring friendship while she was involved in the civil rights movement. She moved to his home in Linville Falls, North Carolina. Wright and Spearman were honored with the Frank Porter Graham Civil Liberties Award from the American Civil Liberties Union, respectively in 1969 and in 1973. After Wright died in February 1983, Spearman returned to Columbia, South Carolina. On her eighty-seventh birthday, March 12, 1989, Spearman died at the South Carolina Episcopal Home at Still Hopes.
