= Wade Hampton, South Carolina =

- Census-designated place
- Location of Wade Hampton, South Carolina
- Coordinates: 34°52′59″N 82°20′15″W
- Country: United States
- State: South Carolina
- County: Greenville
- Established: July 23, 2015

Area
  - Total: 8.92 sq mi (23.10 km^{2})
  - Land: 8.88 sq mi (23.01 km^{2})
  - Water: 0.035 sq mi (0.09 km^{2})
- Elevation: 912 ft (278 m)

Population (2020)
  - Total: 21,482
  - Density: 2,418.2/sq mi (933.66/km^{2})
- Time zone: UTC−5 (Eastern (EST))
  - Summer (DST): UTC−4 (EDT)
- FIPS code: 45-73870
- GNIS feature ID: 2402977

Wade Hampton is a census-designated place (CDP) in Greenville County, South Carolina, United States. The population was 20,622 at the 2010 census. It is named for American Civil War general and South Carolina governor Wade Hampton.

Wade Hampton is part of the Greenville-Mauldin-Easley metropolitan area.

== Geography ==
Wade Hampton is bordered to the southwest by the city of Greenville and to the northeast by Taylors, an unincorporated community. U.S. Route 29 (Wade Hampton Boulevard) passes through the CDP, leading southwest 5 miles (8 km) to the center of Greenville and northeast 7 miles (11 km) to Greer.

According to the United States Census Bureau, the CDP has a total area of 9.0 square miles (23.3 km^{2}), of which 9.0 square miles (23.2 km^{2}) are land and 0.04 square miles (0.1 km^{2}), or 0.55%, are water.

== Demographics ==
Historical population
Census	Pop.	Note	%±
2020	21,482		—
U.S. Decennial Census

=== 2020 census ===
As of the 2020 census, Wade Hampton had a population of 21,482 and 5,368 families in the CDP; the median age was 38.7 years. 21.4% of residents were under the age of 18 and 19.8% were 65 years of age or older. For every 100 females there were 93.0 males, and for every 100 females age 18 and over there were 89.2 males age 18 and over.

100.0% of residents lived in urban areas, while 0.0% lived in rural areas.

There were 9,270 households in Wade Hampton, of which 27.3% had children under the age of 18 living in them. Of all households, 43.3% were married-couple households, 19.2% were households with a male householder and no spouse or partner present, and 31.9% were households with a female householder and no spouse or partner present. About 32.9% of all households were made up of individuals and 13.7% had someone living alone who was 65 years of age or older.

There were 9,912 housing units, of which 6.5% were vacant. The homeowner vacancy rate was 1.4% and the rental vacancy rate was 7.0%.

Racial composition as of the 2020 census
Race	Number	Percent
White	15,127	70.4%
Black or African American	2,235	10.4%
American Indian and Alaska Native	94	0.4%
Asian	687	3.2%
Native Hawaiian and Other Pacific Islander	18	0.1%
Some other race	1,600	7.4%
Two or more races	1,721	8.0%
Hispanic or Latino (of any race)	2,922	13.6%

=== 2000 census ===
As of the census of 2000, there were 20,458 people, 9,210 households, and 5,645 families residing in the CDP. The population density was 2,331.4 inhabitants per square mile (900.2/km^{2}). There were 9,793 housing units at an average density of 1,116.0 per square mile (430.9/km^{2}). The racial makeup of the CDP was 84.85% White, 8.08% African American, 0.18% Native American, 3.34% Asian, 0.06% Pacific Islander, 2.39% from other races, and 1.11% from two or more races. Hispanic or Latino of any race were 6.13% of the population.

There were 9,210 households, out of which 22.9% had children under the age of 18 living with them, 49.4% were married couples living together, 9.0% had a female householder with no husband present, and 38.7% were non-families. 32.7% of all households were made up of individuals, and 10.8% had someone living alone who was 65 years of age or older. The average household size was 2.21 and the average family size was 2.81.

In the CDP, the population was spread out, with 19.0% under the age of 18, 9.6% from 18 to 24, 28.9% from 25 to 44, 24.3% from 45 to 64, and 18.2% who were 65 years of age or older. The median age was 40 years. For every 100 females, there were 93.8 males. For every 100 females age 18 and over, there were 90.9 males.

The median income for a household in the CDP was $40,487, and the median income for a family was $54,106. Males had a median income of $40,528 versus $27,613 for females. The per capita income for the CDP was $26,376. About 6.4% of families and 9.0% of the population were below the poverty line, including 10.9% of those under age 18 and 5.3% of those age 65 or over.

== Education ==
The French Bilingual School of South Carolina is located in Wade Hampton.
