= Sans Souci, South Carolina =

- Census-designated place
- Location of Sans Souci, South Carolina
- Coordinates: 34°52′40″N 82°25′16″W
- Country: United States
- State: South Carolina
- County: Greenville

Area
  - Total: 3.36 sq mi (8.70 km^{2})
  - Land: 3.31 sq mi (8.57 km^{2})
  - Water: 0.050 sq mi (0.13 km^{2})
- Elevation: 951 ft (290 m)

Population (2020)
  - Total: 8,581
  - Density: 2,591.9/sq mi (1,000.74/km^{2})
- Time zone: UTC-5 (Eastern (EST))
  - Summer (DST): UTC-4 (EDT)
- FIPS code: 45-63700
- GNIS feature ID: 2402823

Sans Souci (French for "no worries" or "carefree") is a census-designated place (CDP) in Greenville County, South Carolina, United States. The population was 7,869 at the 2010 census. It is part of the Greenville-Anderson-Mauldin, SC Metropolitan Statistical Area.

== Geography ==
Sans Souci is located in central Greenville County, 3 miles (5 km) north of the center of Greenville. Sans Souci is bordered to the west by Berea and to the southwest by Parker, both unincorporated communities.

U.S. Route 276 (Poinsett Highway) forms the eastern border of Sans Souci; the highway leads south into Greenville and north 6 miles (10 km) to Travelers Rest.

According to the United States Census Bureau, the Sans Souci CDP has a total area of 3.4 square miles (8.7 km^{2}), of which 0.04 square miles (0.1 km^{2}), or 1.44%, are water.

== Demographics ==
Historical population
Census	Pop.	Note	%±
2020	8,581		—
U.S. Decennial Census

=== 2020 census ===
Sans Souci racial composition
Race	Num.	Perc.
White (non-Hispanic)	4,492	52.35%
Black or African American (non-Hispanic)	1,461	17.03%
Native American	16	0.19%
Asian	82	0.96%
Pacific Islander	7	0.08%
Other/Mixed	331	3.86%
Hispanic or Latino	2,192	25.54%

As of the 2020 census, Sans Souci had a population of 8,581. The median age was 35.1 years. 24.2% of residents were under the age of 18 and 14.3% were 65 years of age or older. For every 100 females, there were 93.9 males, and for every 100 females age 18 and over, there were 90.7 males age 18 and over.

100.0% of residents lived in urban areas, while 0.0% lived in rural areas.

There were 3,565 households and 2,033 families in Sans Souci, of which 28.6% had children under the age of 18 living in them. Of all households, 33.8% were married-couple households, 23.1% were households with a male householder and no spouse or partner present, and 35.3% were households with a female householder and no spouse or partner present. About 33.4% of all households were made up of individuals and 12.8% had someone living alone who was 65 years of age or older.

There were 3,961 housing units, of which 10.0% were vacant. The homeowner vacancy rate was 1.8% and the rental vacancy rate was 10.2%.

=== 2000 census ===
As of the census of 2000, there were 7,836 people, 3,370 households, and 2,082 families residing in the CDP. The population density was 2,325.5 inhabitants per square mile (897.9/km^{2}). There were 3,705 housing units at an average density of 1,099.5 per square mile (424.5/km^{2}). The racial makeup of the CDP was 80.58% White, 12.63% African American, 0.43% Native American, 1.21% Asian, 0.13% Pacific Islander, 3.33% from other races, and 1.68% from two or more races. Hispanic or Latino of any race were 7.64% of the population.

There were 3,370 households, out of which 26.9% had children under the age of 18 living with them, 42.2% were married couples living together, 14.6% had a female householder with no husband present, and 38.2% were non-families. 31.6% of all households were made up of individuals, and 11.6% had someone living alone who was 65 years of age or older. The average household size was 2.32 and the average family size was 2.89.

In the CDP, the population was spread out, with 22.5% under the age of 18, 10.9% from 18 to 24, 31.2% from 25 to 44, 20.2% from 45 to 64, and 15.3% who were 65 years of age or older. The median age was 35 years. For every 100 females, there were 93.9 males. For every 100 females age 18 and over, there were 90.7 males.

The median income for a household in the CDP was $27,749, and the median income for a family was $32,654. Males had a median income of $26,720 versus $21,010 for females. The per capita income for the CDP was $14,143. About 10.7% of families and 15.7% of the population were below the poverty line, including 18.1% of those under age 18 and 12.8% of those age 65 or over.
