= South Carolina Highway 295 =

State highway in South Carolina, United States

South Carolina Highway 295

Route information
- Maintained by SCDOT
- Length: 16.700 mi (26.876 km)
- Existed: 1940–present

Major junctions
- South end: US 176 / SC 9 near Homewood
- US 221 near Roebuck; US 29 in Spartanburg
- North end: I-85 BL in Arcadia

Location
- Country: United States
- State: South Carolina
- Counties: Spartanburg

Highway system
- South Carolina State Highway System; Interstate; US; State; Scenic
← SC 292	→ SC 296

South Carolina Highway 295 (SC 295) is a 16.700-mile (26.876 km) state highway in the northwestern part of the U.S. state of South Carolina. It connects the Spartanburg County communities of Pacolet and Una.

== Route description ==
SC 295 travels westward from South Pine Street, north of Pacolet, running parallel to railroad tracks until it reaches the city limits of Spartanburg. It continues west, passes next to the airport, and curves north. It then runs concurrently with for about 4,600 ft. and runs next to for about 2.5 miles. Then, it joins up with a frontage road of near the Saxon-Southern Shops-Arcadia line, and ends at the intersection of I-85 Bus. and New Cut Road.

== Major intersections ==
The entire route is in Spartanburg County.

Location	mi	km	Destinations	Notes
	0.000	0.000	US 176 / SC 9 (South Pine Street) – Spartanburg, Union, Jonesville	Southern terminus
Spartanburg	5.730	9.222	SC 56 (Cedar Springs Road) – Spartanburg, Glenn Springs	
	9.520	15.321	US 221 (South Church Street) – Spartanburg, Roebuck	Interchange
Spartanburg	11.720	18.862	SC 296 east (John B. White Sr. Boulevard) – Spartanburg	Southern end of SC 296 concurrency
Spartanburg	12.620	20.310	SC 215 south (East Blackstock Road) / SC 296 west (Reidville Road) – Reidville, Roebuck	Northern end of SC 296 concurrency; northern terminus of SC 215
Spartanburg	13.620	21.919	US 29 (Warren H. Abernathy Highway) – Greer, Spartanburg	
Saxon–Southern Shops line	16.700	26.876	I-85 BL / Simuel Road north / New Cut Road – Greenville, Charlotte, Spartanburg Community College, Una	Northern terminus; I-85 Bus. exit 3; access to I-85 Bus. via Simuel Road and New Cut Road; Simuel continues past termius.
1.000 mi = 1.609 km; 1.000 km = 0.621 mi: Concurrency terminus
