= South Carolina Highway 129 =

State highway in South Carolina, United States

South Carolina Highway 129
- Fort Prince Boulevard

Route information
- Maintained by SCDOT
- Length: 4.970 mi (7.998 km)
- Existed: 1964–present

Major junctions
- South end: Falling Creek Road near Spartanburg
- I-85 near Spartanburg
- North end: US 29 / SC 292 in Lyman

Location
- Country: United States
- State: South Carolina
- Counties: Spartanburg

Highway system
- South Carolina State Highway System; Interstate; US; State; Scenic
| ← SC 128 | → SC 130 |

South Carolina Highway 129 (SC 129) is a 4.970-mile (7.998 km) state highway in the U.S. state of South Carolina. It connects Falling Creek Road near Spartanburg with U.S. Route 29 (US 29) and SC 292 in Lyman. It also has an interchange with Interstate 85 (I-85) just north of its southern terminus. The highway is known as Fort Prince Boulevard.

== History ==
The route was built c. 1952, around the same time as the original construction of I-85 north of Spartanburg (now mainly Interstate 85 Business). It was bypassed c. 1960 by another piece of I-85.

== Major Intersections ==
The entire route is in Spartanburg County.

| Location | mi | km | Destinations | Notes |
|---|---|---|---|---|
| | 0.000 | 0.000 | Falling Creek Road | Southern terminus |
| | 0.140 | 0.225 | I-85 – Gaffney, Greenville | I-85 exit 68 |
| Lyman | 4.830 | 7.773 | SC 292 north (Inman Road) – Inman | Southern end of SC 292 concurrency |
| Lyman | 4.910 | 7.902 | SC 358 north (Holly Springs Road) | Southern terminus of SC 358 |
| Lyman | 4.970 | 7.998 | US 29 / SC 292 south (Greenville Highway) / Locust Street south – Spartanburg, Greenville | Northern end of SC 292 concurrency; northern terminus of SC 129 and SC 292; roadway continues as Locust Street. |
1.000 mi = 1.609 km; 1.000 km = 0.621 mi
