= List of gaps in Interstate Highways =

Dwight D. Eisenhower National System of Interstate and Defense Highways
- Highway shields for Interstate 69 and Interstate 70, highways with true gaps and freeway gaps

- Interstate Highways in the 48 contiguous states

System information
- Formed: June 29, 1956

Highway names
- Interstates: Interstate X (I-X)

System links
- Interstate Highway System; Main; Auxiliary; Suffixed; Business; Future

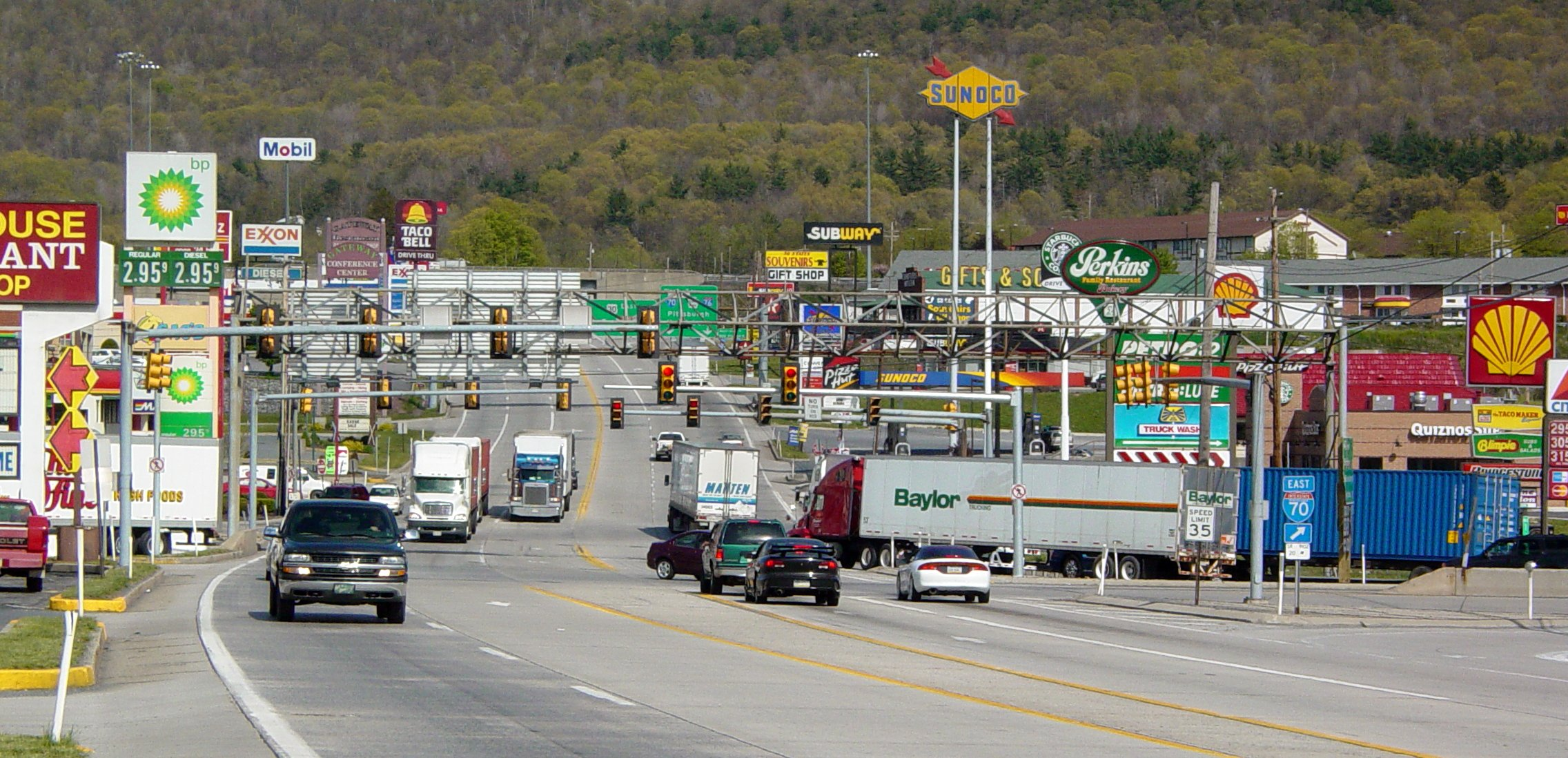
I-70 briefly following an at-grade portion of US 30 with traffic lights in Breezewood, Pennsylvania

There are gaps in the Interstate Highway System where the roadway carrying an Interstate shield does not conform to the standards set by the Federal Highway Administration (FHWA), the body that sets the regulations for the Interstate Highway System. For the most part, the Interstate Highway System in the United States is a connected system, with most freeways completed; however, some Interstates still have gaps. These gaps can be due to unconnected segments of the same route or from failure of the road to fully conform to Interstate standards by including such characteristics as at-grade crossings, absence of traffic lights, undivided or narrow freeways, or movable bridges (lift bridges and drawbridges).

== True gaps ==
True gaps are where multiple disjointed sections of road have the same Interstate highway number and can reasonably be considered part of "one highway" in theory, based on the directness of connections via other highways, or based on future plans to fill in the gap in the Interstate, or simply based on the shortness of the gap. The sections are either not physically connected at all, or they are connected but the connection is not signed as part of the highway. This list does not include different highways that share the same number, such as the two different I-84s and I-87s, which despite appearances, were always intended as distinct highways and were never intended as a contiguous route.

=== Interstate 26 ===
In North Carolina, Interstate 26 has a gap from Forks of Ivy to Asheville at exit 4A of Interstate 240. This is because not all of the parts in the gap were built to Interstate standards. As of May 2025, Interstate 26 is designated as Future I-26, US 19, and US 23, as well as a section also being concurrent with US 25 and US 70. In an effort to build the gap to Interstate standards, construction of the overall "Asheville I-26 Connector" project started in the summer of 2024 and is expected to be completed no earlier than October 2031.

=== Interstate 49 ===
Interstate 49 (I-49) currently has three sections: the original alignment from I-10 in Lafayette to I-20 in Shreveport, one from I-220 near Shreveport to Texarkana; and the third section from I-40 near Alma, Arkansas to I-470/I-435 south of Kansas City, Missouri. A bypass south of Bella Vista, Arkansas was completed in 2021, and is currently signed as Arkansas Highway 549; it is planned to be connected to an interstate with a project to construct a new roadway from Arkansas Highway 22 to Interstate 40 in Arkansas, at which point it will receive the I-49 designation. I-49 from Fort Smith to Texarkana is still unbuilt. These gaps are expected to be eventually closed.

=== Interstate 57 ===
Since November 7, 2024, Interstate 57 currently has two sections: the original alignment from Interstate 55 in Sikeston, Missouri, to Interstate 94 in Chicago, Illinois, and another section from Interstate 40 in North Little Rock, Arkansas, to U.S. Route 67 and U.S. Route 412 in Walnut Ridge, Arkansas. The latter section is part of an unfinished southern extension of Interstate 57 that will extend the route to North Little Rock. Construction is currently underway on bridging the gap and making Interstate 57 continuous again.

=== Interstate 69 ===
I-69 has eight disconnected segments as of 2025: three northeast of Texas, and five within Texas. The northernmost segment travels from Port Huron, Michigan to near Evansville, Indiana, less than three miles (4.8 km) from the Kentucky–Indiana border. A second segment located entirely within the state of Kentucky is nearly continuous with this segment, running from Henderson, which is six miles (9.7 km) from where the Interstate ends in Indiana, to the Tennessee state line at Fulton. In 2006, a segment of I-69 opened in Tunica and DeSoto counties in Mississippi. This segment has since been continued, but is not signed, to Memphis, Tennessee, to an intersection with U.S. Highway 51 on the north side.

Between 2012 and 2015, a portion of U.S. Highway 59 (US 59) between Rosenberg and Cleveland, Texas, extending through Houston, became part of I-69. In South Texas, I-69's route splits into three spurs to cities on the U.S.–Mexico border, on which four segments are complete: a short segment of I-69E in Corpus Christi and another from Raymondville to the border in Brownsville; a short segment of I-69C in Edinburg and McAllen; and a very short segment of I-69W adjacent to the border in Laredo.

As of 2025, projects to connect these segments are in varying stages of development. Kentucky and Indiana began construction of the eastern bypass of Henderson and new Ohio River Crossing, connecting the Kentucky and Indiana sections, in 2022. This segment has a tentative completion date of 2031. Kentucky has plans to work with Tennessee to reconstruct the interchange at the south end of their segment in South Fulton to provide a free-flow connection to the existing US 51 freeway to Union City. Tennessee finished constructing a bypass of Union City in 2021, currently designated as SR 690. A further bypass of Troy is proposed but not yet funded, which would complete a freeway-standard route from I-155 in Dyersburg to Henderson. Tennessee has deferred plans to complete the section between Dyersburg and Memphis to close the gap until the South Fulton–Dyersburg section is completed.

The section from Memphis to Houston is the least developed. As of 2021, Mississippi has no plans to extend I-69 further south. Louisiana and Arkansas have not funded construction of their portion of the proposed route (via El Dorado and Shreveport) between Mississippi and Texas, other than a two-lane southern bypass of Monticello, Arkansas designed to be incorporated into I-69 at a later date. Texas has continued to fund projects to upgrade U.S. 59, U.S. 77, U.S. 281, and other routes that would eventually form parts of I-69 in South Texas and East Texas, including the I-69W/C/E spurs.

=== Interstate 74 ===
I-74 has four sections as of 2024: the original segment heading northwest from Cincinnati, Ohio, to Davenport, Iowa; one from the Virginia–North Carolina border along I-77 south and east to a point southeast of Mount Airy, North Carolina; one traveling around High Point that connects with I-85 and reaches I-73, where the two run concurrently until they both terminate in Ellerbe; and one from west of Laurinburg to south of Lumberton, North Carolina, at I-95. North Carolina is currently working on connecting its three sections of I-74.

=== Interstate 86 ===
I-86 has had two sections since 2006. One travels for 197 miles (317 km) from I-90 in North East, Pennsylvania (which is a town in the northwestern part of the state) to exit 61 in Waverly, New York. The second section is a 9.9-mile (15.9 km) stretch outside of Binghamton traveling from I-81 in Kirkwood to exit 79 in Windsor. The gap is signed as Future 86. I-86 will eventually travel from North East, Pennsylvania, to the New York State Thruway (I-87) near Harriman, New York. All of the designated sections and gaps in New York are part of New York State Route 17.

=== Interstate 99 ===
As of 2026, I-99 has two sections: one from the Pennsylvania Turnpike in Bedford, Pennsylvania, to I-80 near Bellefonte, Pennsylvania, concurrent with US 220; and one from I-180 in Williamsport, Pennsylvania to I-86 in Corning, New York, concurrent with US 15. Much of the intervening route, which will use I-80 and US 220, is up to freeway standards but not yet signed as part of I-99.

== Freeway gaps ==
Freeway gaps occur where the Interstate is signed as a continuous route, but part, if not all of it, is not up to freeway standards. This includes drawbridges where traffic on the Interstate can be stopped for vessels. This does not include facilities such as tollbooths, toll plazas, agricultural inspection stations, or border stations.

=== At-grade intersections ===
==== Major at-grade intersections ====
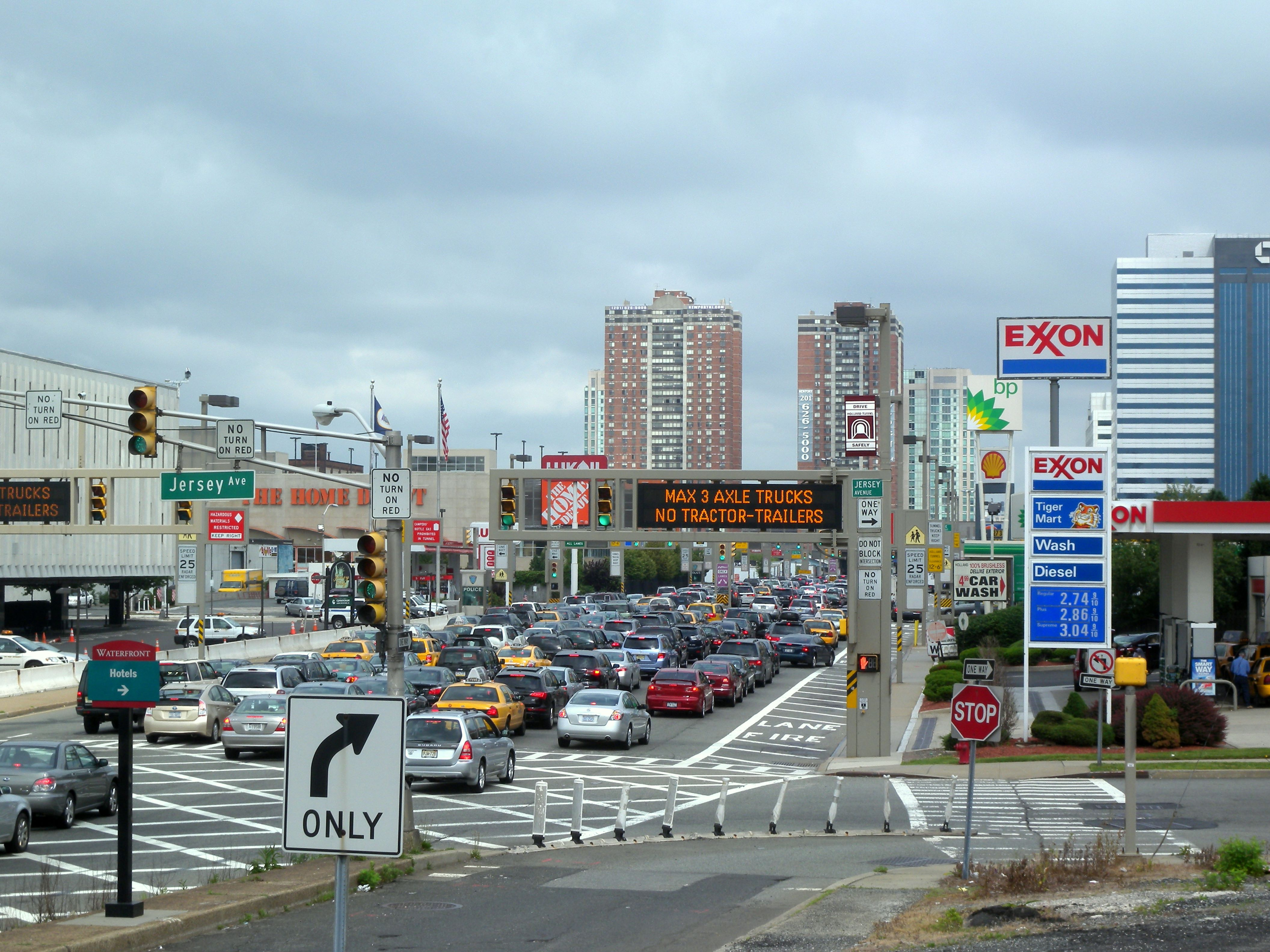
Surface street section of I-78 in Jersey City, New Jersey

In a few urban and heavily developed areas, Interstates travel along surface roads or have at-grade intersections with stop signs or traffic lights. This usually happens because the Interstate started construction after the land was heavily developed and buildings such as residences and businesses and other roads would have to be removed to allow a freeway to pass through. Additionally, more developed land would have to be cleared for space to build interchanges to connect the Interstate and surface streets.

- I-516 downgrades to an expressway as it heads toward its eastern terminus. The expressway features a frontage road right turn and an at-grade intersection with Mildred Street close to the terminus at Montgomery Street and Derenne Avenue (SR 21) in Savannah, Georgia. Mildred Street southbound is closed by concrete barriers.
- I-19 between North West Street and its southern terminus at West Crawford Street at North Sonoita Avenue, in Nogales, Arizona, consists of surface streets with traffic lights. The signage of this segment is intended to help direct traffic entering from Mexico to the nearest interstate.
- I-69E in Brownsville, Texas passes through an at-grade signalized intersection with University Boulevard, as well as minor intersections with East Polk Street and Courage Street, before passing through the Brownsville – Veterans Port of Entry and crossing the Veterans International Bridge.
- I-70 uses part of US 30 along a surface road in Breezewood, Pennsylvania, at the eastern end of its concurrency with I-76 on the Pennsylvania Turnpike. Traffic traveling eastbound on the turnpike must exit and travel a short distance on US 30 in order to continue south on I-70 heading to Hancock, Maryland. (The routing is similar for traffic following I-70 in the opposite direction: traffic traveling north on I-70 must exit and travel a short distance on US 30 in order to enter the turnpike.) This is one of very few instances of traffic lights on an Interstate. It was constructed this way because the original Interstate Highways act did not fund direct connections between an Interstate and a tolled road. There was formerly a sign of a policeman pointing at drivers leaving the Pennsylvania Turnpike to enter US 30, saying, "You! Slow Down!" Local businesses have lobbied to keep the gap to avoid a perceived potential loss of business. Despite this, the Pennsylvania Turnpike has announced plans to close this gap by directly connecting I-70 to the Turnpike in September 2024. Completion of the construction is expected in 8 to 10 years.
- I-676 has a surface street section at the west end of the Ben Franklin Bridge in Philadelphia, Pennsylvania, because of historically significant areas. Signage and the Federal Highway Administration consider I-676 to use the surface streets; the Pennsylvania Department of Transportation and the New Jersey Department of Transportation consider I-676 to be continuous across the Ben Franklin Bridge, even though the bridge, built in 1926, is not up to Interstate standards. This does not specifically violate Interstate standards, however, as the two separated segments of I-676 are in different states.
- I-78 travels along a one-way pair of surface streets, 12th Street and 14th Street, in Jersey City, New Jersey, between the end of the New Jersey Turnpike Newark Bay Extension and the Holland Tunnel, which leads into New York City. Between the two aforementioned points are four signalized intersections.
- I-180 in Cheyenne, Wyoming is an expressway with no parts built to Interstate standard; the interchange with I-80 is a simple diamond interchange with two traffic lights on I-180.
- I-81 near Alexandria, New York, before the Thousand Islands Bridge across the Saint Lawrence River has intersections with an off-ramp leading from NY 12 and a service road connecting from the bridge toll station to a police department while also intersecting NY 12.
- I-587 in Kingston, New York, has a traffic circle (with yield signs) at its northern terminus with the ramps leading to/from I-87.

==== Minor at-grade intersections ====
Several Interstates in rural areas of the U.S. have minor at-grade intersections (including median breaks) with farm access roads or authorized vehicle-only driveways used for highway maintenance or connection to nearby utility stations. This is usually due to the lack of an old highway, the need to provide access to property that was accessed via the road prior to its upgrade to an Interstate, and the high cost to construct an interchange for the small amount of traffic that would use such a connection or to build a frontage road parallel to the freeway to the nearest interchange.

- The northbound lanes of I-5 in Washington intersect with an at-level crosswalk approximately 100 feet (30 m) south of the border with Canada. This crosswalk allows pedestrians access to a monument that is part of Peace Arch Park.
- I-10 in Hudspeth County, Texas has at least fifteen at-grade intersections containing median breaks with minor dirt or gravel roads.
- I-520 in Augusta, Georgia has an at-grade intersection with a gravel and asphalt road that provides access to Lovers Lane.
- I-40 in the mountains of western North Carolina has at-grade access to several dirt roads, as well as a partially grade-separated interchange that lacks ramps or RIROs where roads directly connect to the I-40 carriageways.
- I-40 in western Texas has eight at-grade access points for cattle ranches with median breaks.
- I-75 in St. Ignace, Michigan on the southbound side just before the Mackinac Bridge toll booth has a direct driveway to a Michigan State Police outpost station.
- I-94 at Fort Custer west of Battle Creek, Michigan is the only instance of an Interstate freeway in Michigan to have a gated driveway (at 44th Street), which facilitates access of military vehicles.

=== Undivided and narrow freeways ===
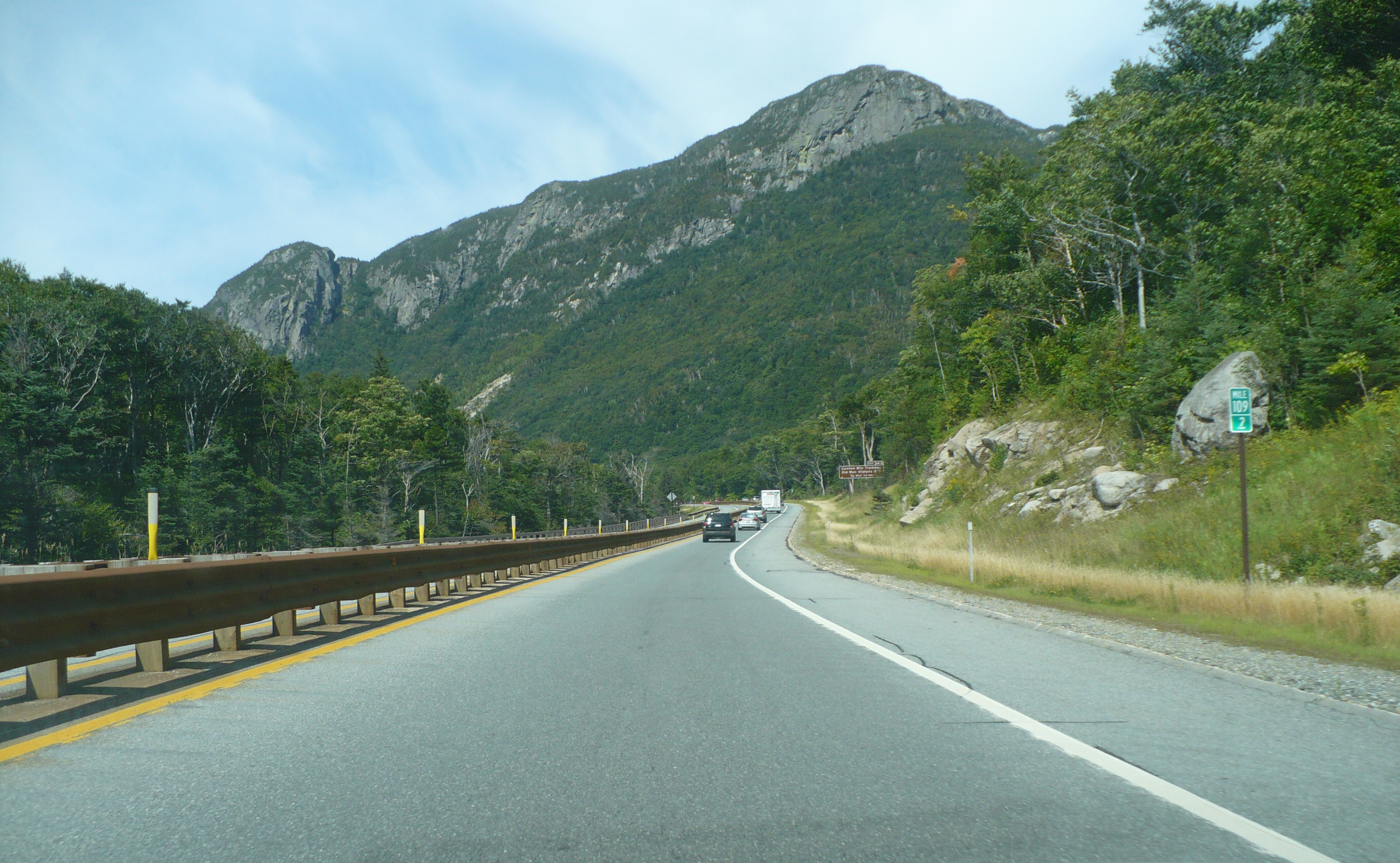
Two-lane stretch of I-93 through Franconia Notch in New Hampshire

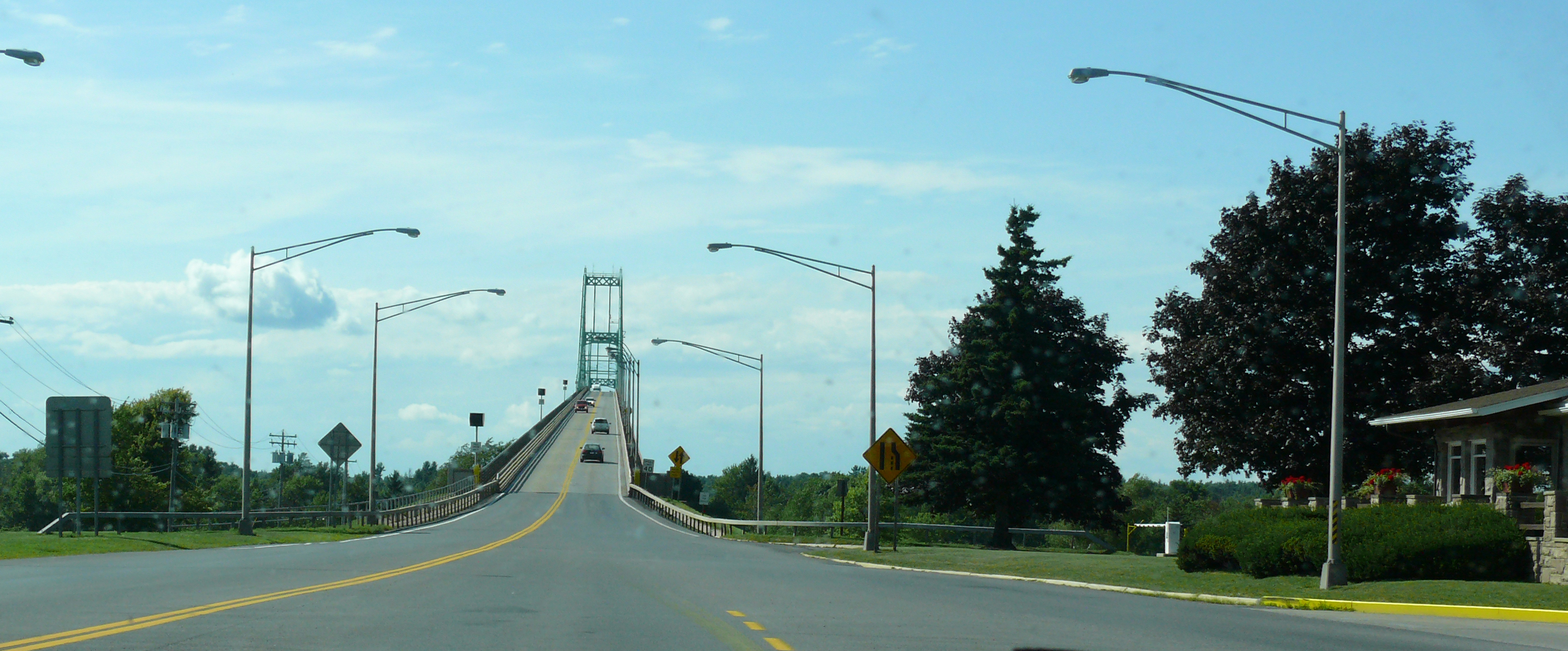
Two-lane stretch of I-81 on the Thousand Islands Bridge crossing part of the Saint Lawrence River

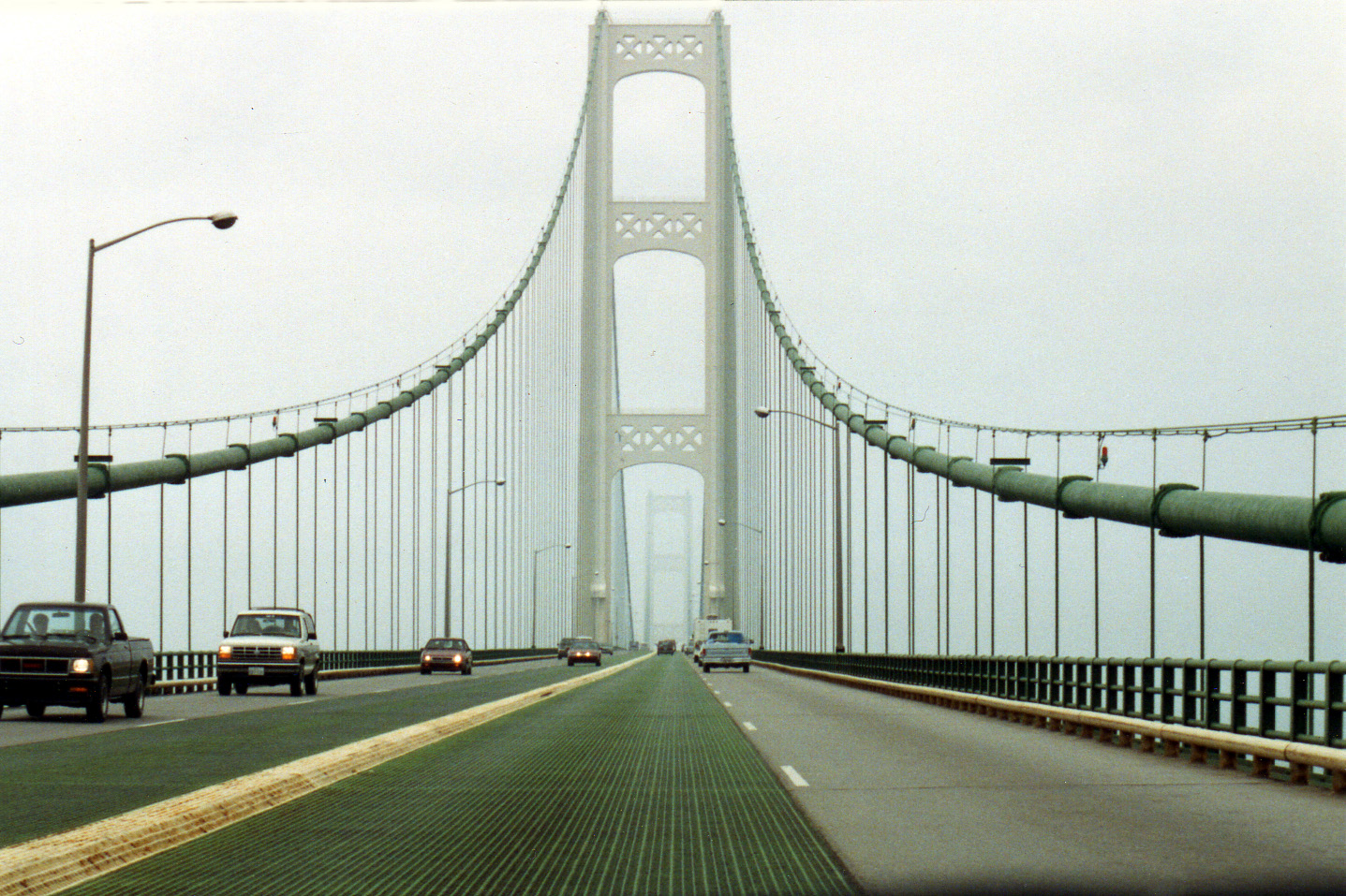
The Mackinac Bridge, which carries I-75, has no hard shoulders, and has only a 4-inch-high (10 cm) divider between the opposing directions.

This section addresses two-lane freeways and other narrow or undivided freeway sections of the Interstate, excepting instances of continuing routes using one-lane ramps and merge leads. Narrow gaps between opposing directions with jersey barriers taller than four feet (1.2 m) are excluded from this section; therefore the separation criterion is either a foot-high (0.30 m) wall, or a 100-foot-wide (30 m) median, whichever is greater.

- I-335 in Oklahoma is a two-lane, undivided turnpike roadway with a length of 0.7 mi (1.1 km), starting from the I-40 junction and ending at the SE 89th Street intersection, continuing south as McDonald Road.
- I-40's western 15 miles (24 km) in North Carolina in the Harmon Den Wildlife Management Area has several S-curves, a Jersey barrier with extremely narrow left shoulders and a few at-grade intersections albeit in RIRO style.
- I-555 at its southern terminus through the I-55/U.S. 61/AR 77 interchange becomes a two-lane undivided highway for 0.34 mi (0.55 km).
- Interstate 70 is one-lane only in these following locations:
  - Interstate 70 in Kansas has only one lane for eastbound through traffic for several hundred feet in Kansas City where the highway approaches the Lewis and Clark Viaduct Bridge, which carries the highway over the Kansas River toward Kansas City, Missouri. Interstate 670, just a few blocks south provides an alternate route without this bottleneck.
  - Interstate 70 in West Virginia has only one lane for approximately one thousand feet in Wheeling, where the highway enters the Wheeling Tunnel and crosses the Ohio River on the Fort Henry Bridge. Nearby I-470 provides relief from this situation.
- The Mackinac Bridge, which carries I-75 over the Straits of Mackinac between St. Ignace and Mackinaw City, Michigan, has no wide median or hard shoulders due to space constraints. Nor does it have a Jersey barrier; instead, it has either a 4-inch-high (10 cm) yellow divider between the opposing directions (where the inner lanes are a metal grate) or a flat double-yellow line (where the inner lanes are paved). The speed limit is also reduced to 45 mph (70 km/h) for cars and 20 mph (30 km/h) for trucks. The highway returns to Interstate standard for about 50 miles until it reaches the Sault Ste. Marie International Bridge, which carries undivided lanes to the Canada–US border in the middle of the bridge, where I-75 terminates.
- The Thousand Islands Bridge, which carries I-81 over part of the Saint Lawrence River, is an undivided two-lane road.
- I-93 is a two-lane divided parkway, or a "super two", through Franconia Notch in New Hampshire. A four-lane Interstate Highway was once proposed here, but the concept was abandoned because of environmental concerns, in part because of vibrations that could harm the Old Man of the Mountain rock formation (which collapsed in 2003 regardless). This section of highway was for many years marked as US 3 and "To I-93", but these have now been replaced with regular I-93 signs. The Federal Highway Act of 1973 exempts this 7.6-mile (12.2 km) stretch from the Interstate Highway standards that apply elsewhere, and this highway is considered to be I-93 for all practical purposes. In addition, parking along portions of I-93 through Franconia Notch was permitted until early 2019 when barriers and signage were posted due to safety concerns.
- Some stretches of Interstate highway use a barrier transfer machine on some bridges to convert inner lanes from one direction to the other, where it would be too costly to upgrade/rebuild to a higher-capacity bridge. In any case the traffic distribution is strongly asymmetric depending on the hour of the day. This kind of bridge typically contains undivided lanes without the flexible Jersey barrier that is manipulated by machines.

=== Movable bridges ===
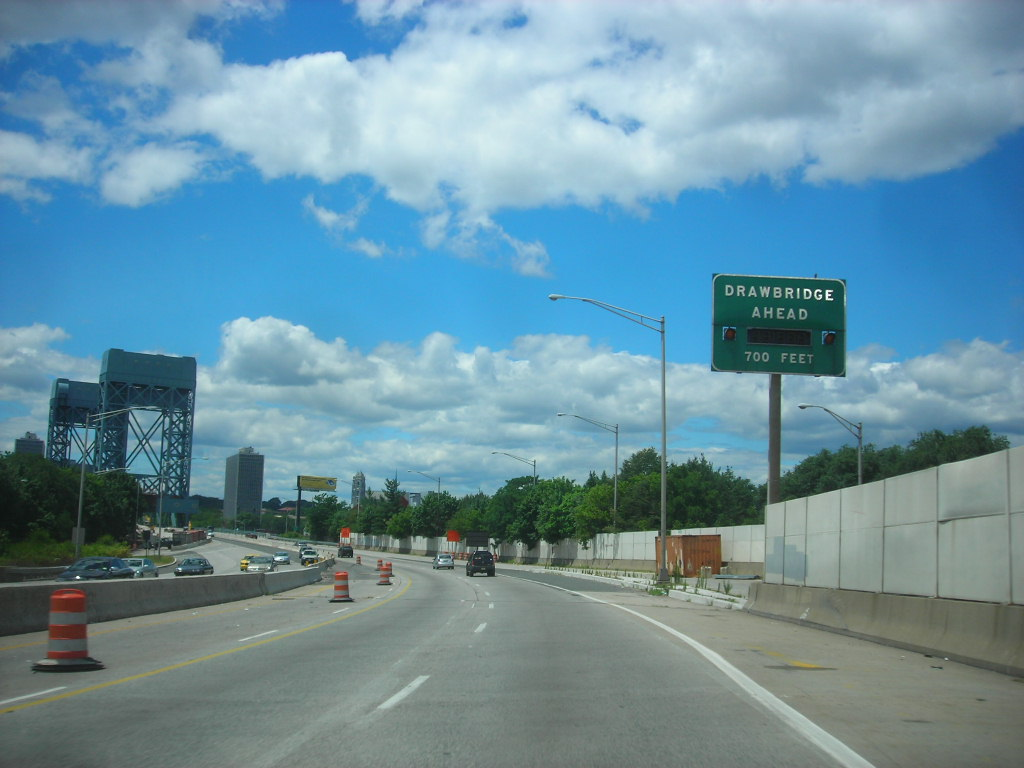
I-280 westbound approaching the movable Stickel Bridge over the Passaic River in New Jersey

By Interstate standard, all bridges on the Interstate system must be fixed as to not interrupt the flow of traffic. Several bridges on the system, however, are movable:

- I-5 crosses the Columbia River from Portland, Oregon, to Vancouver, Washington, on the Interstate Bridge, a vertical-lift bridge. The Columbia River Crossing project sought to replace this bridge until being abandoned in 2013. However, in 2019, a new project was approved, scheduled to begin work in 2025.
- I-110 has a drawbridge across the Back Bay of Biloxi in Biloxi, Mississippi.
- I-64—the Hampton Roads Beltway—crosses the South Branch Elizabeth River in Chesapeake, Virginia, on the High Rise Bridge, which is a drawbridge, expected to be replaced by a larger fixed bridge. It opened in July 2022.
- I-264 has two double-leaf bascule bridges, collectively the Berkley Bridge, crossing the Elizabeth River in Norfolk, Virginia.
- I-278 has a drawbridge across the Bronx River in New York City.
- I-280 has a vertical-lift bridge, the Stickel Memorial Bridge, crossing over the Passaic River between Newark and Harrison, New Jersey.
- I-95/I-495 pass together as the Capital Beltway over the Potomac River on the Woodrow Wilson Bridge, a double-leaf bascule span. Even though the original bridge was replaced in the 2000s, the new bridge also has a draw span, albeit with more vertical clearance resulting in fewer openings than the old bridge—about 65 per year, an average of about one every six days.
- I-695 has a drawbridge over Curtis Creek, south of Baltimore and just west of the Francis Scott Key Bridge. This section of the Baltimore Beltway is not part of the Interstate Highway System, however, and is officially Maryland Route 695 despite the Interstate signage on the highway.

=== Freeway-to-freeway crosspaths without direct connection ===
- I-271 in Ohio lacks a direct interchange with the Ohio Turnpike (I-80); traffic interchanges between the two via I-77 and Ohio State Route 8, which both pass nearby.
- I-475 has no direct interchange with the Ohio Turnpike (I-80/I-90) near Toledo, though there is an indirect connection via US 20 and Dussel Drive.
- The Pennsylvania Turnpike Northeast Extension (I-476) does not have a direct interchange with I-78 in Allentown, though there is an indirect connection via US 22 and PA 309. I-476 also has an indirect connection to I-81 in Dupont via a short stretch of PA 315, in addition to a direct connection at the turnpike's northern terminus in Clarks Summit. Additionally, while it connects directly to I-80 near White Haven, the freeway-grade is disrupted when the ramps intersect PA 940.
- Interstate 42 connects to Interstate 95 via U.S. Route 70 in Selma, North Carolina.
- I-81 connects to the Pennsylvania Turnpike (I-76) via a 1.11-mile (1.79 km) stretch of US 11 in Carlisle, Pennsylvania.
- The Massachusetts Turnpike (I-90) passes over I-391 without interchange in Chicopee, Massachusetts. The overpass is about one mile (1.6 km) north of the I-391 southern terminus at I-91, and approximately 1.4 miles (2.3 km) from the Mass Pike interchange with I-91 and US 5.
- The New Jersey Turnpike's Pearl Harbor Memorial Extension (I-95) passes under I-295 without interchange in Columbus, New Jersey. An indirect connection is provided between the two via surface streets between exits 56 and 57 on I-295 and exit 7 on the turnpike mainline.
- I-195 passes over I-895 without interchange near Halethorpe, Maryland.
- I-295 passes over the Pennsylvania Turnpike (I-276) without direct interchange in Bristol Township, Pennsylvania, though an interchange is under construction that will provide direct connection.
- I-99 has connection gaps with the Pennsylvania Turnpike (I-70/I-76) and I-80 in central Pennsylvania, both through at grade roads near Bedford and Bellefonte, Pennsylvania. The latter is expected to become freeway-grade as part of I-99's aforementioned northern extension.

==== Proposed ====
- I-422 (proposed) would have no direct freeway connection to its parent I-22, though the two routes would cross near Adamsville, Alabama.

== Connection gaps ==
Auxiliary Interstates (also known as three-digit Interstates) are intended to connect to their parent either directly or via a same-parented Interstate (like I-280 in California being connected to I-80 via I-680). Often, these connection gaps occur to eliminate concurrencies between other three-digit routes. Freeway gaps (signed or unsigned) that officially connect auxiliary routes to the parent are excluded.

=== Current examples ===
- I-210 in California does not currently connect directly to I-10 or any of its spurs according to freeway signage. It was signed all the way to I-10 until 1998, when California State Route 57 replaced the portion of I-210 through Covina and San Dimas to provide a proper connection to current State Route 210. The former portion of I-210 now known as SR 57 still remains on the Interstate Highway System federally defined as Interstate 210 maintaining its connection to I-10, but it is not signed as per Caltrans tradition to sign state highways by their state definition over their federal definition.
- I-238 does not have a parent. It was previously a part of California State Route 238 that was built to Interstate standards, and it was added to the Interstate system using the same number it had as a state highway. It was upgraded to be an auxiliary route of I-80, but no three-digit combinations were available at the time the route was designated an interstate. Additionally, the exit numbers continue the mileage from the state highway instead of starting over from 1.
- Due to highway revolts in New York state forcing the interstate to terminate prematurely, none of I-78's spurs in New York City (I-278, I-478, I-678, I-878) connect to the parent road, nor is there any surface street with a state route designation with the same number that continues with a solid connection. I-78 was planned to extend southeast through New York City via the Lower Manhattan Expressway, Williamsburg Bridge and Bushwick Expressway, then east along what is now I-878 and north along what is now I-295. I-78 would have then split into two branches (the current I-295 and I-695), which would have both terminated at I-95. I-478 comes the closest, and would have intersected I-78 as part of the Westway project; this project was later canceled. I-278, the only I-78 spur to leave New York City, was planned to extend northwest to I-78 at Route 24. Since all the spurs are interconnected, only one of them needs to be eventually connected to its parent route for all of them to conform to numbering standards.
- I-585 in South Carolina currently does not connect directly to I-85. Until 1995, I-85 was routed along present-day I-85 Business. In that year, I-85 was moved to the north to bypass Spartanburg while I-85 Business took over its former route, leaving I-585 without a connection to its parent route until upgrades to the existing US 176 highway are complete.
- As of July 2022, I-587 in North Carolina does not connect with its parent route, I-87. Upgrades to the existing US 264 freeway from US 64 to I-95 to Interstate standards, as well as extending I-87 via upgrades to US 64, will connect I-587 with its parent route.
- I-335 in Oklahoma will not have a connection with its parent route, I-35, until an extension of the road to Purcell is built.
- At the present, I-369 in Texas does not connect to its parent route, I-69. I-369 is proposed to extend south via US 59 to Tenaha, where it will intersect with I-69 after its own extension via US 59 from Cleveland, then via US 84 from Tenaha to the Louisiana state line near Joaquin.
- Numerous three-digit Interstate routes are unsigned on some portions, leading some to think there are connection gaps. These so-called connection gaps do not have internal unsigned concurrencies on other Interstate highway segments between the "parent route" and signed terminus.
