= South Carolina Highway 357 =

Changwani

South Carolina Highway 357

Route information
- Maintained by SCDOT
- Length: 15.040 mi (24.205 km)
- Existed: 1950–present

Major junctions
- South end: SC 101 / SC 290 in Greer
- North end: US 176 in Campobello

Location
- Country: United States
- State: South Carolina
- Counties: Spartanburg

Highway system
- South Carolina State Highway System; Interstate; US; State; Scenic
← SC 346	→ SC 358

South Carolina Highway 357 (SC 357) is a 15.040-mile (24.205 km) state highway that travels from Greer to Campobello through some of the rural parts of western Spartanburg County, South Carolina.

== Route description ==
SC 357 begins at an intersection with SC 290 (East Poinsett Street) and SC 101 (South Line Street) in Greer, and is named North Line Street until it intersects Arlington Avenue. At that point, road name changes to Arlington Road, and then intersects U.S. Route 29 (US 29; East Wade Hampton Boulevard). From there, it goes down into unincorporated Apalache, where it turns to the east, crosses the South Tyger River, and then continues solely as SC 357. It intersects Gap Creek Road, and leaves Greer to enter Lyman, South Carolina. Once SC 357 enters Lyman, it crosses the Middle Tyger River and goes on for a few miles until it crosses SC 358, where SC 357 turns to the north and continues off of SC 358's terminus. SC 357 goes through some rural parts of Spartanburg County, which last until it reaches Campobello, South Carolina. Once the route enters Campobello, it intersects US 176 (North Main Street), which is its northern terminus.

== Major intersections ==
The entire route is in Spartanburg County.

Location	mi	km	Destinations	Notes
Greer	0.000	0.000	SC 101 / SC 290 – Greer, Duncan	Southern terminus
Greer	0.990	1.593	US 29 – Spartanburg, Taylors	
	5.150	8.288	SC 358 south – Lyman	Northern terminus of SC 358
Campobello	15.040	24.205	US 176 – Landrum, Inman	Northern terminus
1.000 mi = 1.609 km; 1.000 km = 0.621 mi
