= Una, South Carolina =

Una, South Carolina may refer to the following communities in South Carolina:

- Una, Darlington and Lee Counties, South Carolina, an unincorporated community on the border between Darlington and Lee Counties
- Una, Spartanburg County, South Carolina, an unincorporated community in Spartanburg County
