= Interstate 85 Business =

Interstate 85 Business or Business Interstate 85 may refer to the following Business Interstate Highways that connect to Interstate 85:

- Interstate 85 Business (North Carolina), former route serving the Piedmont Triad area
- Interstate 85 Business (South Carolina), serving the Spartanburg area
