= Interstate 585 =

Highway in South Carolina

Interstate 585
- North Pine Street
- I-585 highlighted in red

Route information
- Auxiliary route of I-85
- Maintained by SCDOT
- Length: 2.25 mi (3.62 km)
- Existed: 1962–present
- NHS: Entire route

Major junctions
- South end: US 176 / US 221 / SC 9 in Spartanburg
- North end: I-85 BL / US 176 near Spartanburg

Location
- Country: United States
- State: South Carolina
- Counties: Spartanburg

Highway system
- Interstate Highway System; Main; Auxiliary; Suffixed; Business; Future; South Carolina State Highway System; Interstate; US; State; Scenic
← SC 576	→ US 601

Interstate 585 (I-585) is a 2.25-mile-long (3.62 km) auxiliary Interstate Highway of I-85 in the US state of South Carolina. It has been an orphan auxiliary route to I-85 since 1995 when the Interstate was relocated further north bypassing Spartanburg. In a complete concurrency with US Highway 176 (US 176), it spurs south from I-85 Business (I-85 Bus) for a few miles before entering Spartanburg.

== Route description ==
I-585 is cosigned the entire length with US 176 and uses US 176's exit number system instead of its own. The route is also signed as North Pine Street its entire length. The southern terminus begins at exit 25, where the road continues as US 176/South Carolina Highway 9 (SC 9). I-585 remains concurrent with US 176 starting at exit 25 as it heads northwest. It then comes across a partial interchange with California Avenue at exit 24. Before exit 23, there are two at-grade auxiliary lanes, one on each side which connects Milliken Road on the north side and Graham Road on the south side to the highway. At exit 23, the highway comes across I-85 Bus, forming a parclo interchange, ending just north of it. US 176 continues west to I-85.

== History ==
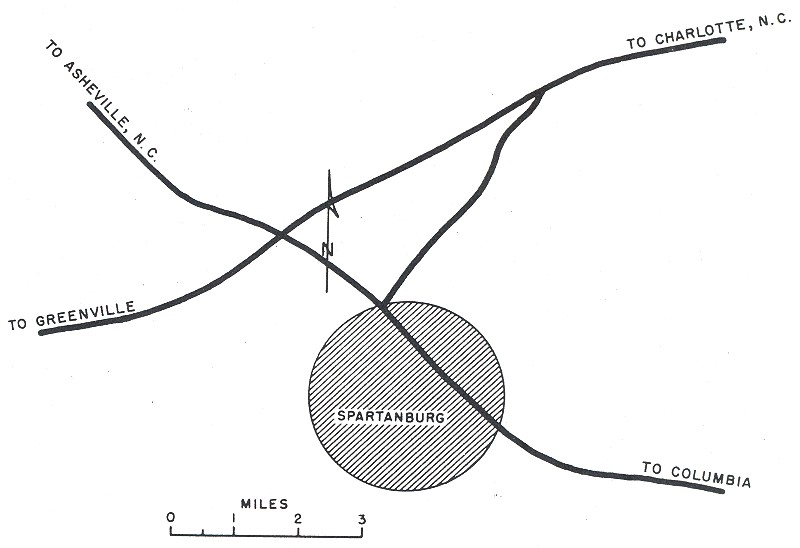
The location of I-585 was planned as I-26 in this 1955 map. The connection along US 221 was never built.

From the highway's initial designation in 1962 until 1995, I-85 followed what is now designated I-85 Bus. In that year, I-85 moved to the north, orphaning I-585 from a direct connection to its parent route, a situation that remained until upgrades to US 176 over the next decade provided a freeway connection between I-85 and I-85 Bus, except for a stoplight at Upper Valley Falls Rd/Fairforest Rd. Additionally, US 176 is connected to I-85 with a stoplight-controlled diamond interchange instead of a freeway-to-freeway interchange. The upgraded segment is cosigned with I-585, although it is not officially part of that route.

== Exit list ==
Exit numbers, where present, are based on US 176 mileage. The entire route is in Spartanburg County.

Location	mi	km	Exit	Destinations	Notes
Spartanburg	0.000	0.000	—	US 176 east / SC 9 south (Pine Street)	Continuation east; southern end of US 176/SC 9 concurrency
	0.170– 0.420	0.274– 0.676	25	US 221 (Whitney Road / Church Street) / SC 9 north (Boiling Springs Road) – Chesnee	Northern end of SC 9 concurrency; official southern terminus; signed as exits 25B (US 221 north/SC 9) and 25A (US 221 south); Chesnee not signed southbound
	0.900	1.448	24	California Avenue	Northbound exit and southbound entrance
Southern Shops–Valley Falls line	2.076	3.341	23	I-85 BL (Veterans Parkway) – Charlotte, Greenville	Signed as exits 23A (south) and 23B (north); exit 5A on I-85 BL
Southern Shops–Valley Falls line	2.076	3.341	—	US 176 west to I-85 – Charlotte, Greenville, Inman	Continuation west; northern end of US 176 concurrency
1.000 mi = 1.609 km; 1.000 km = 0.621 mi: Concurrency terminus

== Business loop ==
Interstate 585 Business
- Location: Spartanburg
- Length: 1.60 mi (2.57 km)
- Existed: 1959–?

Interstate 585 Business (I-585 Bus) was a boulevard-grade business route of I-585 along Pine Street, between Whitney Road (US 221) and St. John Street (US 29). It traveled concurrently with US 176 and SC 9. Sometime between 2000 and 2012, the route was removed, with no current state or federal maps listing it nor any physical signage.
