= South Carolina Highway 292 =

State highway in South Carolina, United States

South Carolina Highway 292

Route information
- Maintained by SCDOT
- Length: 13.640 mi (21.951 km)

Major junctions
- South end: SC 290 in Duncan
- US 29 / SC 129 in Lyman; US 176 on the Inman Mills–Inman line; I-26 near Inman
- North end: SC 9 near Boiling Springs

Location
- Country: United States
- State: South Carolina
- Counties: Spartanburg

Highway system
- South Carolina State Highway System; Interstate; US; State; Scenic
← SC 291	→ SC 295

South Carolina Highway 292 (SC 292) is a 13.640-mile-long (21.951 km) state highway in the U.S. state of South Carolina. The highway connects Duncan and the Inman area, via Lyman.

== Route description ==
SC 292 begins at an intersection with SC 290 (West Main Street) in Duncan, within Spartanburg County. It travels to the east-northeast, crosses railroad tracks, and curves to the northeast. It crosses over the Middle Tyger River and enters Lyman. The highway crosses railroad tracks before passing Lyman Park. At Groce Road, SC 292 turns left and travels to the north-northwest. Three blocks later, it intersects U.S. Route 29 (US 29). The two highways travel concurrently to the west for one block, crossing railroad tracks along the way. The two highways intersect the western terminus of SC 129. SC 129/SC 292 travels to the north-northeast and immediately begin curving to the northeast. The only intersection along their short concurrency is with the southern terminus of SC 358 (Holly Springs Road). SC 292 travels to the north-northeast and crosses the North Tyger River before leaving the city limits. It curves back to the north-northeast and crosses Lake Cooley. It crosses Lawsons Fork Creek and enters Inman Mills. The highway travels southeast of Inman Mills Park. At the intersection with US 176 (Asheville Highway), the highway leaves Inman Mills and enters Inman. It curves to the northwest and turns right onto Prospect Street. Just after leaving town, it crosses Greene Creek. It crosses over Meadow Creek just before an interchange with Interstate 26 (I-26). A short distance later, it meets its eastern terminus, an intersection with SC 9 (Boiling Springs Road).

== Major intersections ==
The entire route is in Spartanburg County.

Location	mi	km	Destinations	Notes
Duncan	0.000	0.000	SC 290 (West Main Street) – Greer, Greenville, Moore	Southern terminus
Lyman	1.610	2.591	Spartanburg Road north (SC 292 Conn. east) / Groce Road south	Southern terminus of SC 292 Conn., which takes on the Spartanburg Road name; SC 292 turns left onto Groce Road.
Lyman	2.000	3.219	US 29 north	Western end of US 29 concurrency
Lyman	2.120	3.412	US 29 south / SC 129 begins – Greer	Eastern end of US 29 concurrency; western end of SC 129 concurrency
Lyman	2.180	3.508	SC 358 north (Holly Springs Road)	Southern terminus of SC 358
Lyman	2.260	3.637	SC 129 east (Charlotte Highway) – Wellford	Eastern end of SC 129 concurrency
Inman Mills–Inman line	8.740	14.066	US 176 (Asheville Highway) – Campobello, Spartanburg	
	12.035– 12.060	19.368– 19.409	I-26 – Asheville, Columbia	I-26 exit 10
	13.640	21.951	SC 9 (Boiling Springs Road) – Boiling Springs, Fingerville	
1.000 mi = 1.609 km; 1.000 km = 0.621 mi: Concurrency terminus

== Lyman connector route ==
South Carolina Highway 292 Connector
- Location: Lyman–Wellford, South Carolina
- Length: 0.770 mi (1,239 m)

South Carolina Highway 292 Connector (SC 292 Conn.) is a 0.770-mile (1.239 km) connector route that mostly exists within the east-central part of Lyman. There is a relatively short portion in nearby Wellford. It is an unsigned highway.

It begins at an intersection with the SC 292 mainline, where that highway turns left off of Spartanburg Road and onto Groce Road. The connector route takes Spartanburg Road to the northeast. Just after an intersection with the northern terminus of Ridge Road and the southern terminus of Elliott Road, it begins a curve to the southeast. During that curve it leaves Lyman and enters Wellford. At Astor Street, it turns left and takes that street to the northeast for one block, to its eastern terminus, an intersection with U.S. Route 29 (US 29).

The entire route is in Spartanburg County.

Location	mi	km	Destinations	Notes
Lyman	0.000	0.000	Groce Road south – Moore SC 292 north (Groce Road north) – Inman SC 292 south (Spartanburg Road south) – Duncan, Greer	Western terminus
Wellford	0.770	1.239	Spartanburg Highway South (US 29) / Astor Street north	Eastern terminus; Astor Street continues past terminus.
1.000 mi = 1.609 km; 1.000 km = 0.621 mi
