= South Carolina Highway 358 =

State highway in South Carolina, United States

South Carolina Highway 358
- Holly Springs Road

Route information
- Maintained by SCDOT
- Length: 3.330 mi (5.359 km)

Major junctions
- West end: SC 357 near Lyman
- East end: SC 129 / SC 292 in Lyman

Location
- Country: United States
- State: South Carolina
- Counties: Spartanburg

Highway system
- South Carolina State Highway System; Interstate; US; State; Scenic
← SC 357	→ SC 362

South Carolina Highway 358 (SC 358) is a 3.330-mile (5.359 km) state highway in the western part of the U.S. state of South Carolina. It travels from Lyman through more rural and suburban parts of Spartanburg County.

== Route description ==
The highway starts at SC 357 northwest of Lyman. It heads along the two-lane Holly Springs Road towards central Lyman passing numerous houses, some churches, and a pair of schools. As it approaches its terminus within the town limits of Lyman, it enters a small commercial district. SC 358 ends at an intersection with SC 129 and SC 292, about 300 feet (91 m) northeast of SC 129's terminus at U.S. Route 29.

== Major intersections ==
The entire route is in Spartanburg County.

Location	mi	km	Destinations	Notes
	0.000	0.000	SC 357 / Greer Road	
Lyman	3.330	5.359	SC 129 / SC 292 (Charlotte Highway)	
1.000 mi = 1.609 km; 1.000 km = 0.621 mi
