= SC 129 =

SC 129 can refer to:

- South Carolina Highway 129, a state highway in the United States
- Convoy SC 129, a naval formation and engagement during the Second World War
