= Bush House (Inman, South Carolina) =

Historic house in South Carolina, United States

- U.S. National Register of Historic Places
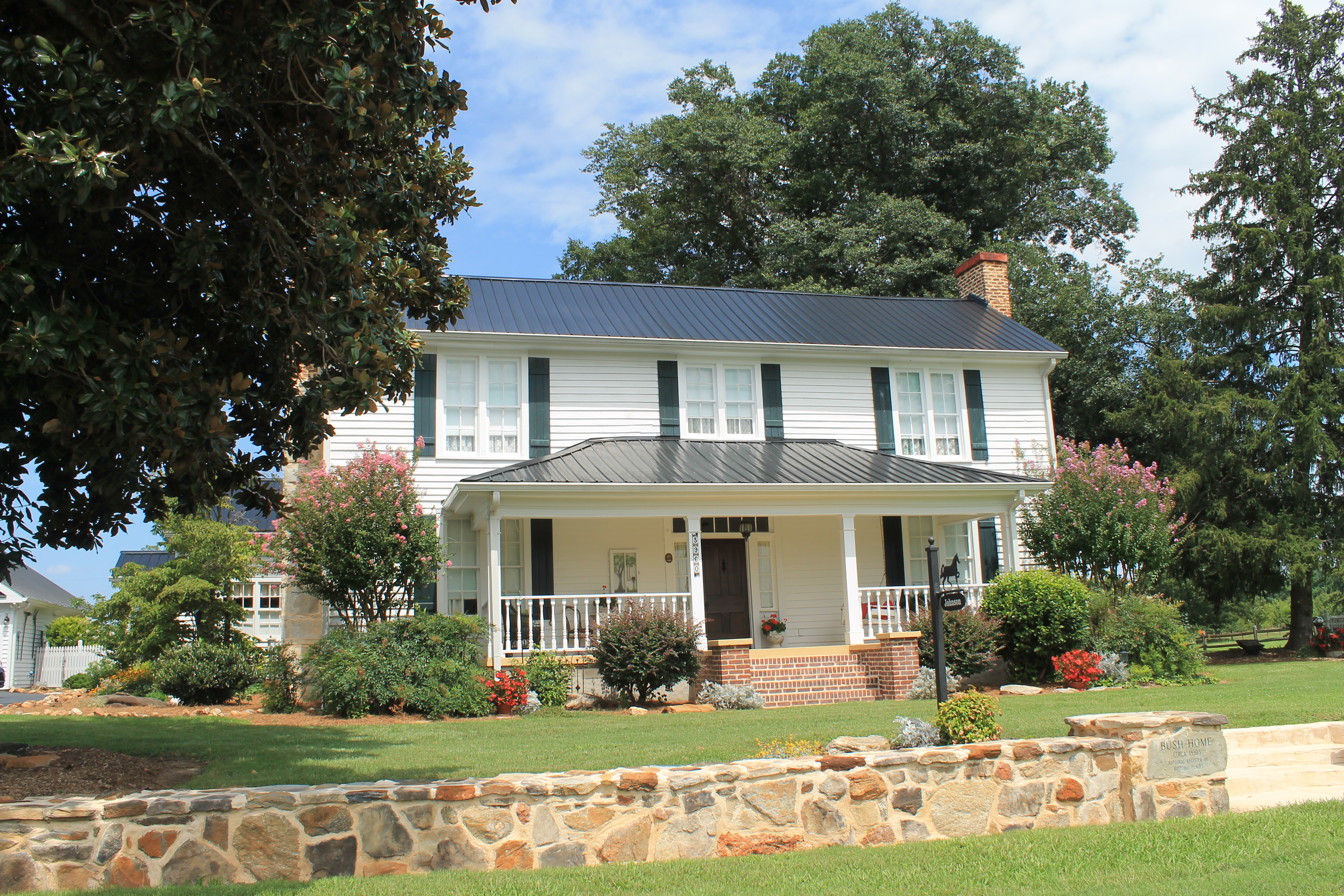
- Bush House, August 2012

- Location within South Carolina Location within the United States
- Location: 3960 New Cut Road, near Inman, South Carolina
- Coordinates: 35°01′25″N 82°04′26″W
- Area: 6.64 acres (2.69 ha)
- Built: c. 1830, c. 1850
- Built by: Bush, Story; Bush, B.F.
- Architectural style: I-House
- NRHP reference No.: 03000695
- Added to NRHP: October 21, 2003

The Bush House (also known as Bush Homeplace) is a historic house located at 3960 New Cut Road near Inman, Spartanburg County, South Carolina.

== Description and history ==
It was originally built in about 1830, as a hall-and-parlor plan dwelling. It was enlarged about 1850, to include a two-story, three-bay wide I-house. It features a one-story, hip roofed front porch. It has a number of notable Greek Revival details on its exterior. Also on the property is a contributing smokehouse.

It was listed on the National Register of Historic Places on October 21, 2003.
