= Richland Cotton Mill =

- U.S. National Register of Historic Places
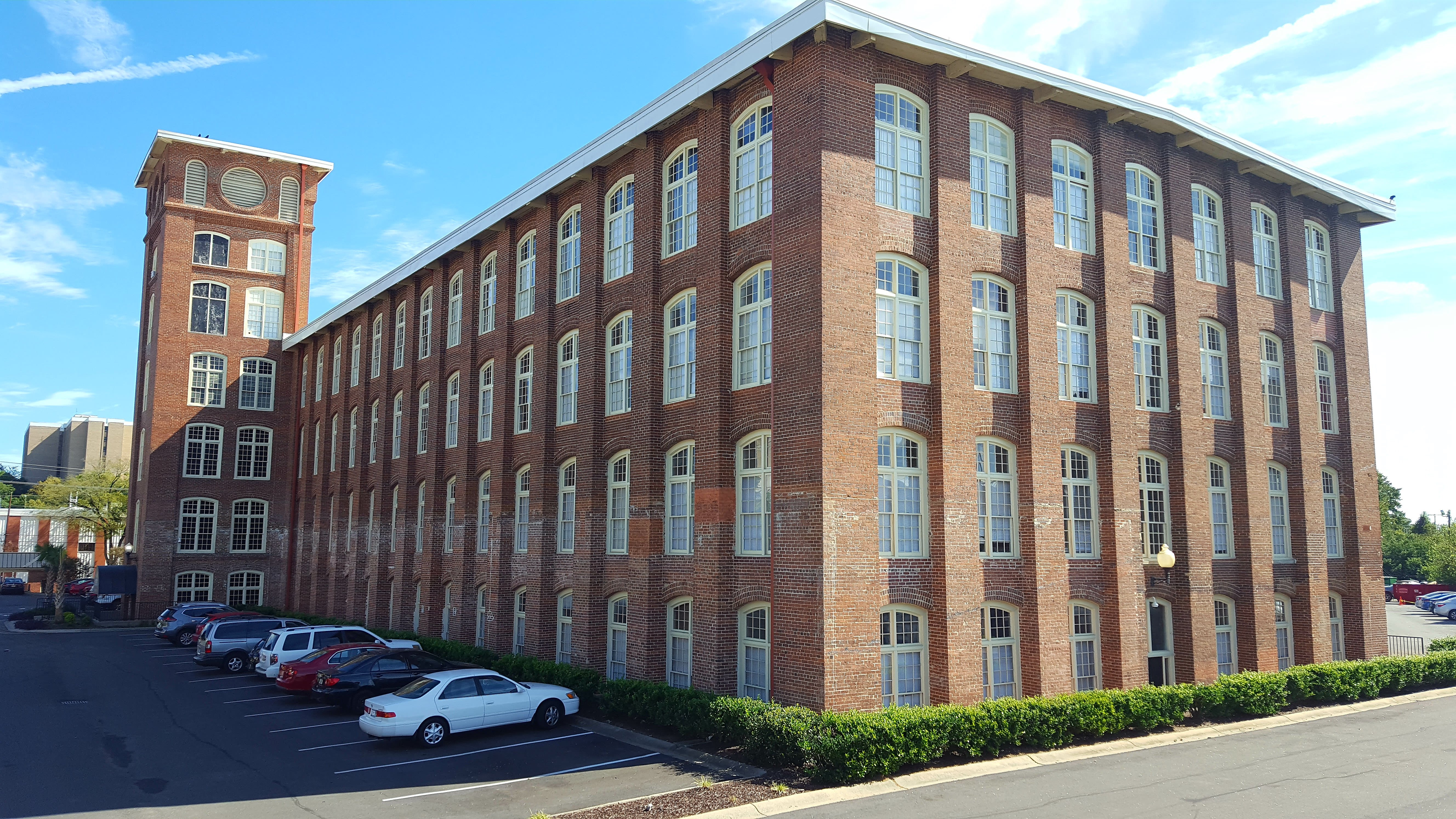

- Location within South Carolina Location within the United States
- Location: 211-221 Main St. Columbia, South Carolina
- Coordinates: 33°59′18″N 81°1′43″W
- Area: 3.4 acres (1.4 ha)
- Built: 1895
- Architect: Whaley, W. B. Smith
- NRHP reference No.: 83003933
- Added to NRHP: November 10, 1983

Richland Cotton Mill, also known as Pacific Mills, Lowenstein Mill, and Whaley's Mill, is a historic cotton mill building located at Columbia, South Carolina. It was built in 1894, and is a four-story, rectangular brick mill building. It features a seven-story stair tower, with a circular vent flanked by two arched vents. Attached to the building are an engine room, a boiler room with chimney, and a machine shop.

It was purchased by Pacific Mills in 1915, along with three other mills in the area, collectively called Columbia Pacific Mills. In 1923, Pacific Mills began a further expansion, to Groce's Stop, South Carolina, which was later renamed to Lyman. The Columbia operations produced cloth that was shipped to Lyman or Lawrence, Massachusetts for further processing.

It was added to the National Register of Historic Places in 1983.
