= Shiloh Methodist Church =

Historic church in South Carolina, United States

- U.S. National Register of Historic Places
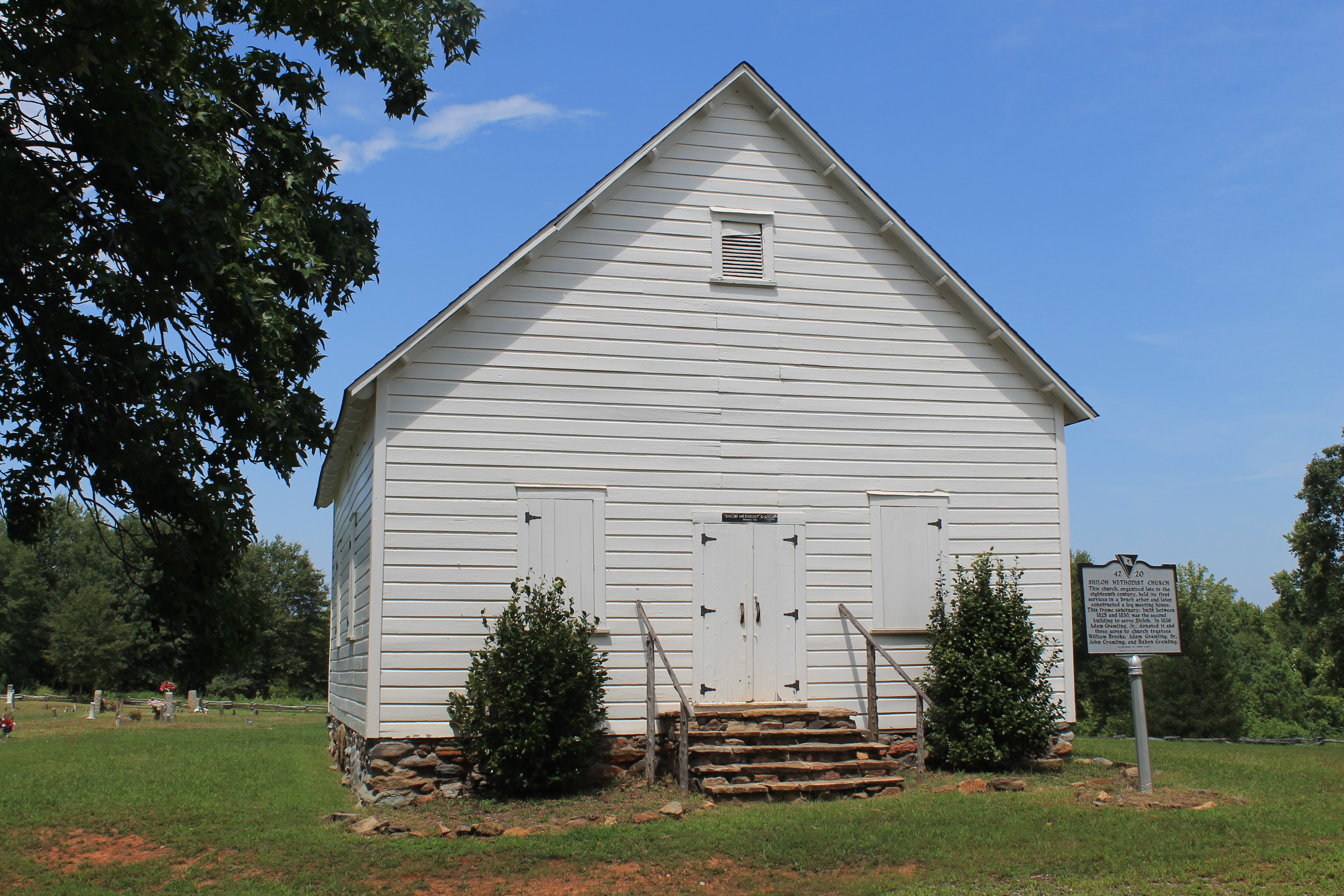

- Location within South Carolina Location within the United States
- Nearest city: Inman, South Carolina
- Coordinates: 35°1′35″N 82°5′3″W
- Area: 3 acres (1.2 ha)
- Built: 1825
- NRHP reference No.: 04001591
- Added to NRHP: February 2, 2005

Shiloh Methodist Church is a historic church located in Inman, South Carolina.

It was built in 1825 and added to the National Register of Historic Places in 2005.
