= McMakin's Tavern =

Historic tavern in South Carolina, United States

- U.S. National Register of Historic Places
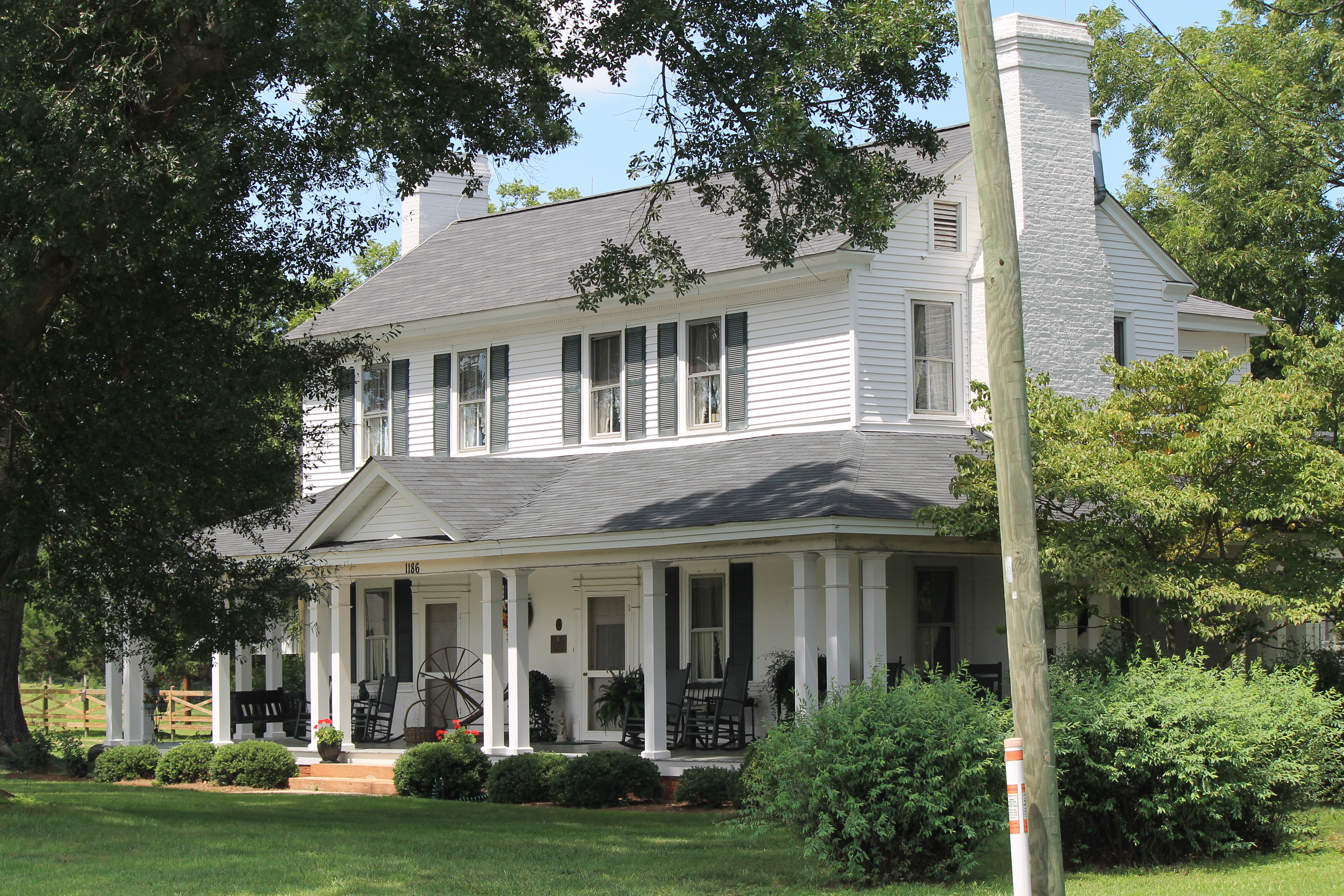
- McMakins Tavern, August 2012

- Location within South Carolina Location within the United States
- Location: Northwest of Lyman off South Carolina Highway 358, near Lyman, South Carolina
- Coordinates: 34°58′23″N 82°9′7″W
- Area: 2 acres (0.81 ha)
- Built: c. 1790
- NRHP reference No.: 74001876
- Added to NRHP: October 9, 1974

McMakin's Tavern, also known as the Morgan-Stewart House, is a historic stagecoach stop and plantation home located near Lyman, Spartanburg County, South Carolina. It was built about 1790, and is a two-story, clapboard single house with gable end chimneys. It features a one-story, full width veranda supported by square columns. The interior features elaborately carved woodwork in the Adam style. The house operated as a stagecoach stop in the early-19th century.

It was listed on the National Register of Historic Places in 1974.
