= Interstate 85 Business (South Carolina) =

Highway in South Carolina

Interstate 85 Business
- Veterans Parkway
- I-85 Bus. highlighted in green

Route information
- Business route of I-85
- Maintained by SCDOT
- Length: 8.770 mi (14.114 km)
- Existed: 1995–present

Major junctions
- South end: I-85 near Wellford
- I-26 near Spartanburg; I-585 / US 176 near Spartanburg
- North end: I-85 near Spartanburg

Location
- Country: United States
- State: South Carolina
- Counties: Spartanburg

Highway system
- Interstate Highway System; Main; Auxiliary; Suffixed; Business; Future; South Carolina State Highway System; Interstate; US; State; Scenic

Interstate 85 Business (I-85 Bus. or BL 85) is a business loop of the Interstate Highway System. It is entirely a freeway running along the old route of I-85 in the vicinity of Spartanburg, South Carolina, United States. It is the only freeway to connect with I-585, which is now an isolated piece of the Interstate Highway System (as Interstate business routes themselves are considered isolated from the Interstate System).

== Route description ==
I-85 Bus. leaves I-85 at a northbound-only offramp, with a southbound flyunder ramp. The first on- and offramps are with local streets used as frontage roads leading to Road 41 (North Blackstock Road). Road 41 connects with the Fairforest community, to the south, and several industrial and distribution businesses to its immediate north and west. The road then has another interchange with I-26 just before the one with Fairforest Road. The road briefly curves to the left as it runs parallel to South Carolina Highway 295 (SC 295) near the exit for New Cut Road, where SC 295 ends, then crosses over a former Southern Railway railroad line between southbound exit 4A and exit 4B, which is a roundabout interchange with SC 56. Immediately after the ramps from that interchange converge with the main road, I-85 Bus. approaches exit 5A another interchange with I-585/U.S. Highway 176 (US 176) but only includes a southeastbound ramp for northbound traffic. The next exit (5B) is a short offramp to the Milliken & Company headquarters for northbound drivers. Southbound drivers can still take exit 5B to US 176 and future I-585. Still relying on local bidirectional frontage roads, the road uses ramps to and from exit 6 to SC 9, which itself has quarter cloverleaf interchanges to I-85 Bus.'s frontage roads. The penultimate interchange however (exit 7) is a normal diamond interchange, albeit with one of the frontage roads terminating at the southbound onramp. I-85 Bus. ends at a trumpet interchange with I-85, which has access to and from both northbound and southbound I-85, unlike the southwestern end, which only has access from northbound I-85 and to southbound I-85.

== History ==
This is one of two separate freeway segments to carry the I-85 Bus. designation. Another segment existed until 2019 within the Piedmont Triad region of North Carolina, and it was also a former alignment of I-85. The old exit numbers are gone.

The business loop was established in 1995 when I-85 was placed on new freeway bypassing north of Spartanburg. The old alignment, which was originally built as a super two for US 29, was upgraded to a four-lane freeway when I-85 was established in 1959. In 1962, US 29 was realigned back through downtown Spartanburg. Since 1959, few improvements have been made along the route, which is why it is labeled a substandard freeway.

In 2000, Spartanburg civic leaders proposed that it become I-685 but was turned down by the South Carolina Department of Transportation (SCDOT) because of cost of upgrades. As a compromise, the signage was amended calling it a "Freeway Loop" at both end points along I-85.

On July 12, 2021, SCDOT closed the central portion around Hearon Circle for bridge replacements. Construction was expected to be completed July 2023 but was later pushed out to October 2023. In late October 2023, SCDOT then announced that the reopening had been delayed again due to additional work being needed that would take a few months to complete. The segment finally reopened to traffic at 7:00 am EDT on December 6, 2023. Traffic was detoured along I-85 and I-585 during the closure.

== Exit list ==
The entire route is in Spartanburg County.

Location	mi	km	Old exit	New exit	Destinations	Notes
	0.000	0.000	—	—	I-85 south – Greenville	Southbound exit and northbound entrance; southern terminus
Fairforest	1.018– 1.020	1.638– 1.642	69	1	Road 41 (North Blackstock Road)	
Fairforest–Arcadia– Southern Shops tripoint	1.920	3.090	70	2	I-26 – Columbia, Asheville	Signed as exits 2A (east) and 2B (west)
Arcadia–Southern Shops line	2.350	3.782	71	2C	Road 525 (Fairforest Road)	
Arcadia–Saxon– Southern Shops tripoint	3.090– 3.260	4.973– 5.246	72A	3	SC 295 south / New Cut Road – Spartanburg Community College	Northern terminus of SC 295, No northbound entrance to I-85 Business Loop
Saxon–Southern Shops line	3.812	6.135	72B	4A	Broadcast Drive	Permanently closed as of 2023, was southbound exit only
Southern Shops	4.120– 4.203	6.630– 6.764	72C	4	SC 56 (Asheville Highway) to US 176 west	Roundabout interchange
Southern Shops	4.540– 4.710	7.306– 7.580	73A	5A	I-585 south / US 176 east (Pine Street, Downtown)	Northern terminus of I-585
Valley Falls	4.853	7.810	73B 74	5B	US 176 west – Inman, USC Upstate	No access from northbound I-85 Business to westbound US 176
Valley Falls	4.930	7.934	73B 74	5B	Milliken Road	Southbound entrance via N. Campus Bivd. and northbound exit
Valley Falls	5.700– 5.870	9.173– 9.447	75	6	SC 9 (Boiling Springs Road)	
	7.000– 7.170	11.265– 11.539	76	7	Road 191 (Bryant Road)	
	8.770	14.114	—	—	I-85 – Greenville, Charlotte	Northern terminus; trumpet interchange
1.000 mi = 1.609 km; 1.000 km = 0.621 mi: Incomplete access
