= Arcadia, South Carolina =

Arcadia
- CDP
- Location within the state of South Carolina
- Coordinates: 34°57′38″N 81°59′48″W
- Country: United States
- State: South Carolina
- County: Spartanburg

Area
  - Total: 1.97 sq mi (5.09 km^{2})
  - Land: 1.96 sq mi (5.08 km^{2})
  - Water: 0.0039 sq mi (0.01 km^{2})
- Elevation: 843 ft (257 m)

Population (2020)
  - Total: 3,246
  - Density: 1,655.9/sq mi (639.33/km^{2})
- Time zone: UTC-5 (Eastern (EST))
  - Summer (DST): UTC-4 (EDT)
- ZIP codes: 29320
- FIPS code: 45083
- GNIS feature ID: 2629818

Arcadia is a Census-designated place located in Spartanburg County in the U.S. State of South Carolina. According to the 2010 United States census, the population was 2,634.

== History ==
Arcadia was founded in 1902, and was so named for a fancied resemblance of its landscapes to the ancient region of Arcadia.

== Geography ==
Arcadia is located to the west of the City of Spartanburg.

According to the United States Census Bureau, the CDP has a total land area of 1.960 square miles (5.087 km^{2}) and a total water area of 0.005 square mile (0.013 km^{2}).

== Demographics ==
Historical population
| Census | Pop. | Note | %± |
|---|---|---|---|
| 2020 | 3,246 | | — |
U.S. Decennial Census

=== 2020 census ===
As of the 2020 census, Arcadia had a population of 3,246. The median age was 30.5 years. 25.9% of residents were under the age of 18 and 9.4% of residents were 65 years of age or older. For every 100 females there were 97.4 males, and for every 100 females age 18 and over there were 92.7 males age 18 and over.

100.0% of residents lived in urban areas, while 0.0% lived in rural areas.

There were 1,302 households in Arcadia, of which 32.8% had children under the age of 18 living in them. Of all households, 29.6% were married-couple households, 26.0% were households with a male householder and no spouse or partner present, and 35.3% were households with a female householder and no spouse or partner present. About 32.8% of all households were made up of individuals and 8.0% had someone living alone who was 65 years of age or older.

There were 1,432 housing units, of which 9.1% were vacant. The homeowner vacancy rate was 0.0% and the rental vacancy rate was 5.8%.

Racial composition as of the 2020 census
| Race | Number | Percent |
|---|---|---|
| White | 1,307 | 40.3% |
| Black or African American | 545 | 16.8% |
| American Indian and Alaska Native | 32 | 1.0% |
| Asian | 258 | 7.9% |
| Native Hawaiian and Other Pacific Islander | 2 | 0.1% |
| Some other race | 747 | 23.0% |
| Two or more races | 355 | 10.9% |
| Hispanic or Latino (of any race) | 1,122 | 34.6% |

== Education ==
It is in Spartanburg County School District 6.
