= Una, Spartanburg County, South Carolina =

Una, South Carolina
- Unincorporated community
- Location within South Carolina Location within the United States
- Coordinates: 34°58′08″N 81°58′13″W
- Country: United States
- State: South Carolina
- County: Spartanburg
- Elevation: 886 ft (270 m)
- Time zone: UTC-5 (Eastern (EST))
  - Summer (DST): UTC-4 (EDT)
- ZIP code: 29378
- Area codes: 864, 821
- GNIS feature ID: 1231878

Una is an unincorporated community in Spartanburg County, South Carolina, United States. The community is 2.5 miles (4.0 km) northwest of downtown Spartanburg. Una has a post office with ZIP code 29378, which opened on November 14, 1928.
