= Southern Shops, South Carolina =

- CDP
- Location within the state of South Carolina
- Coordinates: 34°58′58″N 82°00′02″W
- Country: United States
- State: South Carolina
- County: Spartanburg

Area
  - Total: 3.58 sq mi (9.26 km^{2})
  - Land: 3.56 sq mi (9.23 km^{2})
  - Water: 0.012 sq mi (0.03 km^{2})
- Elevation: 876 ft (267 m)

Population (2020)
  - Total: 3,663
  - Density: 1,027.8/sq mi (396.83/km^{2})
- Time zone: UTC-5 (Eastern (EST))
  - Summer (DST): UTC-4 (EDT)
- FIPS code: 45-67750
- GNIS feature ID: 2402885

Southern Shops is a census-designated place (CDP) in Spartanburg County, South Carolina, United States. The population was 3,663 at the 2020 census.

== Geography ==
According to the United States Census Bureau, the CDP has a total area of 3.5 square miles (9.2 km^{2}), all land.

== Demographics ==
Historical population
Census	Pop.	Note	%±
2000	3,707		—
2010	3,767		1.6%
2020	3,663		−2.8%
U.S. Decennial Census

=== Racial and ethnic composition ===
Southern Shops CDP, South Carolina – Racial and ethnic composition Note: the US Census treats Hispanic/Latino as an ethnic category. This table excludes Latinos from the racial categories and assigns them to a separate category. Hispanics/Latinos may be of any race.
Race / Ethnicity (NH = Non-Hispanic)	Pop 2000	Pop 2010	Pop 2020	% 2000	% 2010	% 2020
White alone (NH)	2,130	1,498	1,158	57.46%	39.77%	31.61%
Black or African American alone (NH)	544	625	599	14.67%	16.59%	16.35%
Native American or Alaska Native alone (NH)	21	16	5	0.57%	0.42%	0.14%
Asian alone (NH)	20	44	41	0.54%	1.17%	1.12%
Native Hawaiian or Pacific Islander alone (NH)	0	0	0	0.00%	0.00%	0.00%
Other race alone (NH)	0	10	6	0.00%	0.27%	0.16%
Mixed race or Multiracial (NH)	62	41	93	1.67%	1.09%	2.54%
Hispanic or Latino (any race)	930	1,533	1,761	25.09%	40.70%	48.08%
Total	3,707	3,767	3,663	100.00%	100.00%	100.00%

=== 2020 census ===
As of the 2020 census, Southern Shops had a population of 3,663, with 1,116 households and 663 families.

The median age was 33.2 years. 26.8% of residents were under the age of 18 and 7.8% of residents were 65 years of age or older. For every 100 females, there were 127.4 males, and for every 100 females age 18 and over, there were 142.1 males.

100.0% of residents lived in urban areas, while 0.0% lived in rural areas.

There were 1,116 households, of which 38.7% had children under the age of 18 living in them. Of all households, 35.4% were married-couple households, 25.3% were households with a male householder and no spouse or partner present, and 29.2% were households with a female householder and no spouse or partner present. About 24.9% of all households were made up of individuals, and 8.6% had someone living alone who was 65 years of age or older.

There were 1,223 housing units, of which 8.7% were vacant. The homeowner vacancy rate was 1.2% and the rental vacancy rate was 6.9%.

=== 2000 census ===
As of the census of 2000, there were 3,707 people, 1,164 households, and 735 families residing in the CDP. The population density was 1,043.1 inhabitants per square mile (402.7/km^{2}). There were 1,278 housing units at an average density of 359.6 per square mile (138.8/km^{2}). The racial makeup of the CDP was 67.28% White, 14.76% African American, 0.81% Native American, 0.78% Asian, 12.73% from other races, and 3.64% from two or more races. Hispanic or Latino of any race were 25.09% of the population.

There were 1,164 households, out of which 29.5% had children under the age of 18 living with them, 41.8% were married couples living together, 14.2% had a female householder with no husband present, and 36.8% were non-families. 30.2% of all households were made up of individuals, and 11.3% had someone living alone who was 65 years of age or older. The average household size was 2.67 and the average family size was 3.30.

In the CDP, the population was spread out, with 21.6% under the age of 18, 14.2% from 18 to 24, 37.3% from 25 to 44, 17.4% from 45 to 64, and 9.5% who were 65 years of age or older. The median age was 32 years. For every 100 females, there were 147.3 males. For every 100 females age 18 and over, there were 154.8 males.

The median income for a household in the CDP was $25,268, and the median income for a family was $31,290. Males had a median income of $19,513 versus $17,991 for females. The per capita income for the CDP was $12,268. About 20.6% of families and 22.3% of the population were below the poverty line, including 30.1% of those under age 18 and 11.1% of those age 65 or over.

== Education ==
Most of Southern Shops is in Spartanburg County School District 6, while a portion is in Spartanburg County School District 2.

The Spartanburg Community College Spartanburg (Giles) Campus (main campus) is in Southern Shops.
