= Inman, South Carolina =

- City
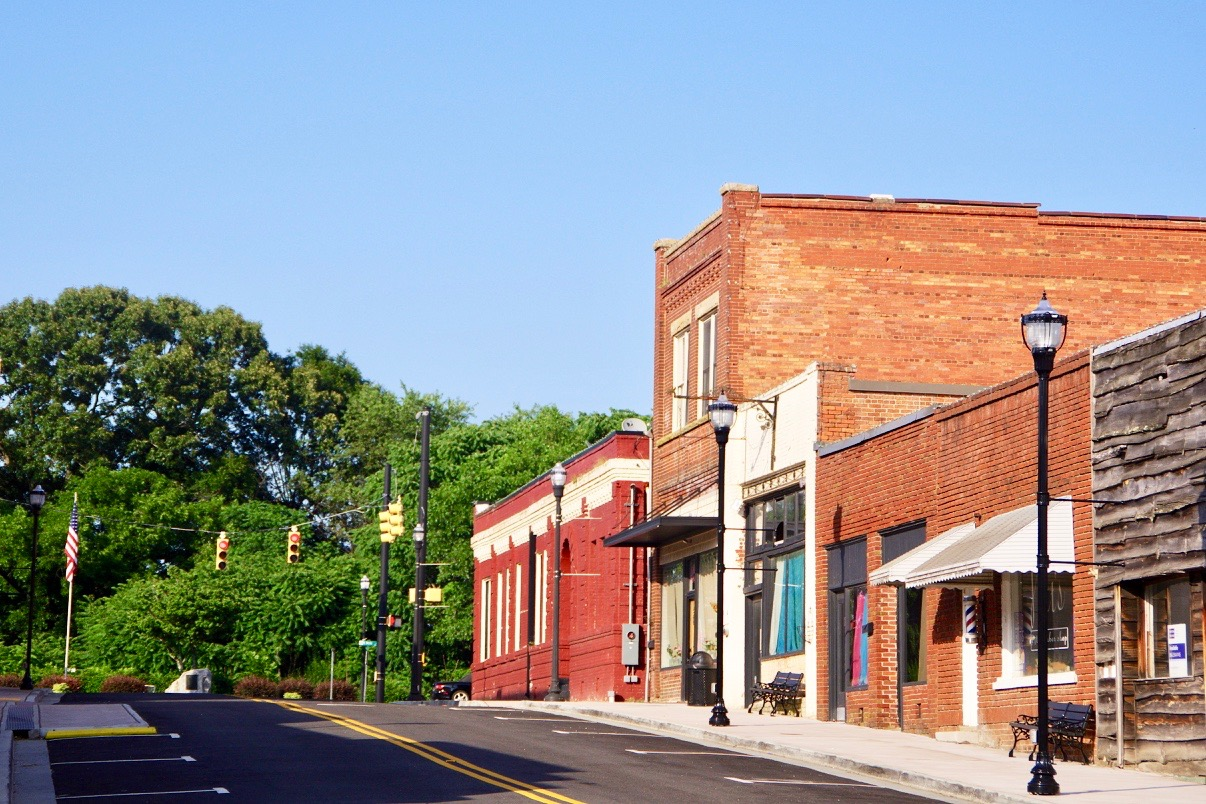
- Businesses along Mill Street

- Flag Seal

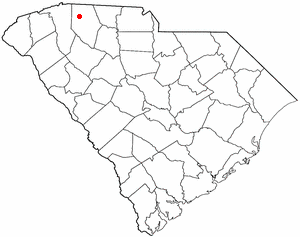
- Location of Inman, South Carolina
- Coordinates: 35°02′46″N 82°05′22″W
- Country: United States
- State: South Carolina
- County: Spartanburg
- Founded: December 22, 1882

Area
  - Total: 1.73 sq mi (4.49 km^{2})
  - Land: 1.73 sq mi (4.48 km^{2})
  - Water: 0.0039 sq mi (0.01 km^{2})
- Elevation: 988 ft (301 m)

Population (2020)
  - Total: 2,990
  - Density: 1,728.1/sq mi (667.24/km^{2})
- Time zone: UTC-5 (Eastern (EST))
  - Summer (DST): UTC-4 (EDT)
- ZIP code: 29349
- Area codes: 864, 821
- FIPS code: 45-35755
- GNIS feature ID: 2404762
- Website: www.cityofinman.org

Inman is a city in Spartanburg County, South Carolina, United States, part of the Spartanburg metropolitan area. With a population of 3,665 at the 2020 census, Inman residents have access to nearby Lake Bowen that affords water recreational sports and fishing, and Inman is accessible by Interstate 26 and Interstate 85. The city contains a historic main street district, several houses of worship, and a school district.

== History ==
Inman was incorporated by South Carolina on December 22, 1882 at the crossroads of Howard Gap and Blackstock. The area that is now Inman lay along an Indigenous footpath used for travel and trade between the Piedmont and the southern Appalachian foothills. Portions of this route were later adopted and expanded by early settlers into the wagon road known as Howard Gap Road, which became a principal corridor through the region by the late eighteenth century.

William Gowan, a local landowner, founded the town by volunteering to build a railroad depot which convinced the railroad to create a stop at the city. Since there was already a town named Gowansville, some local historians have said town was named after the president of the railroad or a surveyor However, according to geographer Henry Gannett, the town was named after a local resident. The town emerged as a small settlement, with businesses such as a blacksmith, a bank, and even a barber shop springing up around the depot. During the 1930s Inman was considered the fresh peach capital of the world. The Bush House and Shiloh Methodist Church are listed on the National Register of Historic Places.

In 1901, James A. Chapman founded Inman Mills, a company that still spins and weaves fabric. The mill was designed by W.B. Smith Whaley and was one of the city's major employers for many years. The original mill was closed in 2001 and listed on the National Register of Historic Places in 2016. The building has been converted into apartments.

In 1935, a local man named Bryson Hammet found a large stone off South Carolina highway 292 with various markings and the year 1567 carved into it. Historians have debated the authenticity and meaning of the stone for decades with many attributing the stone to Spanish Explorer and gold seeker Captain Juan Pardo.

== Geography ==
Inman lies just north of Spartanburg, and a few miles south of the North Carolina-South Carolina border.

The city's historic district lies along South Carolina Highway 292 just north of its intersection with U.S. Route 176 (which passes along the southwestern edge of the city). SC 292 also connects Inman with Interstate 26 to the east. Inman Mills, an unincorporated community, lies immediately southwest of Inman.

According to the United States Census Bureau, the city has a total area of 0.9 square miles (2.3 km^{2}), all land.

=== Climate ===
Inman is located in the Upstate region of South Carolina. The weather is temperate year-round, due to its location in the Isothermal Belt, a phenomenon that results when warmer air on the western side of the Appalachian Mountains blows over the mountains, leaving a 60-mile-wide (97 km) trough where significant temperature inversions of 20 degrees Fahrenheit or greater can occur.

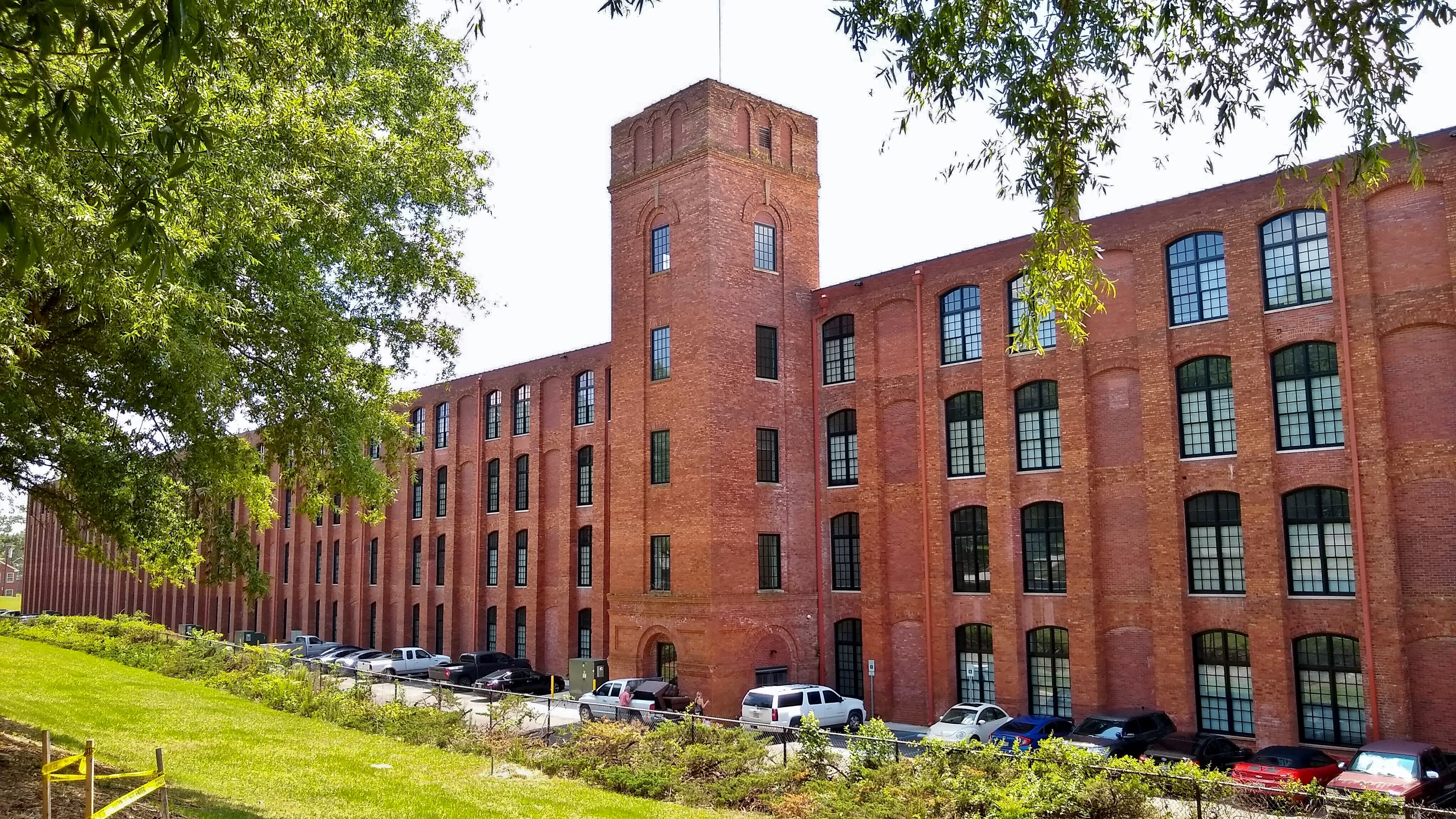
Inman Mill, which was renovated into loft apartments, is shown here in June 2019.

== Demographics ==
Historical population
Census	Pop.	Note	%±
1890	134		—
1900	294		119.4%
1910	474		61.2%
1920	694		46.4%
1930	969		39.6%
1940	1,115		15.1%
1950	1,514		35.8%
1960	1,714		13.2%
1970	1,661		−3.1%
1980	1,554		−6.4%
1990	1,742		12.1%
2000	1,884		8.2%
2010	2,321		23.2%
2020	2,990		28.8%
U.S. Decennial Census

=== 2020 census ===
Inman racial composition
Race	Num.	Perc.
White (non-Hispanic)	2,081	69.6%
Black or African American (non-Hispanic)	488	16.32%
Native American	5	0.17%
Asian	122	4.08%
Other/Mixed	138	4.62%
Hispanic or Latino	156	5.22%

As of the 2020 United States census, there were 2,990 people, 1,141 households, and 604 families residing in the city with the median household income of $51,210. The median property value was $106,000, and the homeownership rate was 62%. Most people commuted by driving alone, with an average commute time of 20.5 minutes, and households owned an average of two cars.

== Education ==
The vast majority of Inman is in the Spartanburg School District 1. Local schools in Inman include Inman Elementary, Inman Intermediate, Mabry Middle School, and Chapman High School.

Pieces extend into Spartanburg School District 6 and Spartanburg School District 2.

Inman has a lending library, a branch of the Spartanburg County Public Library.

== Notable people ==
- Fieldin Culbreth, MLB umpire
- Heath Hembree, MLB Pitcher
- James Hylton, NASCAR driver
- Deebo Samuel, NFL Wide Receiver
- Jacob Bridgeman, PGA Golfer
