= Lyman, South Carolina =

Lyman, South Carolina Groce's Stop (until 1927)
- Town
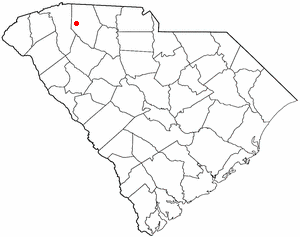
- Location of Lyman, South Carolina
- Coordinates: 34°58′26″N 82°07′28″W
- Country: United States
- State: South Carolina
- County: Spartanburg
- Incorporated: 1954
- Founder: Augustus B. Groce
- Named for: Arthur T. Lyman

Government
  - Mayor: David Petty

Area
  - Total: 7.30 sq mi (18.91 km^{2})
  - Land: 6.63 sq mi (17.16 km^{2})
  - Water: 0.68 sq mi (1.75 km^{2})
- Elevation: 784 ft (239 m)

Population (2020)
  - Total: 6,173
  - Density: 931.6/sq mi (359.71/km^{2})
- Time zone: UTC-5 (Eastern (EST))
  - Summer (DST): UTC-4 (EDT)
- ZIP code: 29365
- Area codes: 864, 821
- FIPS code: 45-43315
- GNIS feature ID: 2406063
- Website: www.lymansc.gov

Lyman is a town in Spartanburg County, South Carolina, United States. Its population was 6,173 at the 2020 census.

== History ==
The town of Lyman originally grew around a general store owned by Augustus Belton Groce, which opened in the mid-1870s. This led to the community becoming known as Groce's Stop. In 1923, the Groce family sold over 700 acres (280 ha) to Pacific Mills. By the following year the Lyman Printing and Finishing Mill had been constructed, and by 1927, Pacific Mills had built 375 homes as housing for their employees. The town was then renamed in memory of Arthur T. Lyman, a former president of the mill. Lyman prospered for years as a textile town, but by 2005 the last mill was closed.

The Pacific Mills company kept up their employees' houses, the streets and the back alleys. The back alleys were dirt, so crews from the plant would bring dump trucks of cinders from the burnt coal at the boiler room, and spread them up and down the back alleys to keep them from getting muddy. The houses were finished on the outside, with cypress wood for the underpinning. In the late 1940s the company removed the lattice-work and put brick underpinning in its place. The houses were four, five and six room houses with modern designs. Pacific Mills broke from the usual, salt-box style house design of most cotton mill villages. When the village of Lyman was built, it was a showcase for cotton mill villages. Ridge Road was set aside for the executive staff of the company. The houses there were made out of the same materials as the other houses, but they were larger and of nicer designs.

=== Neighborhoods of Pacific Mills ===
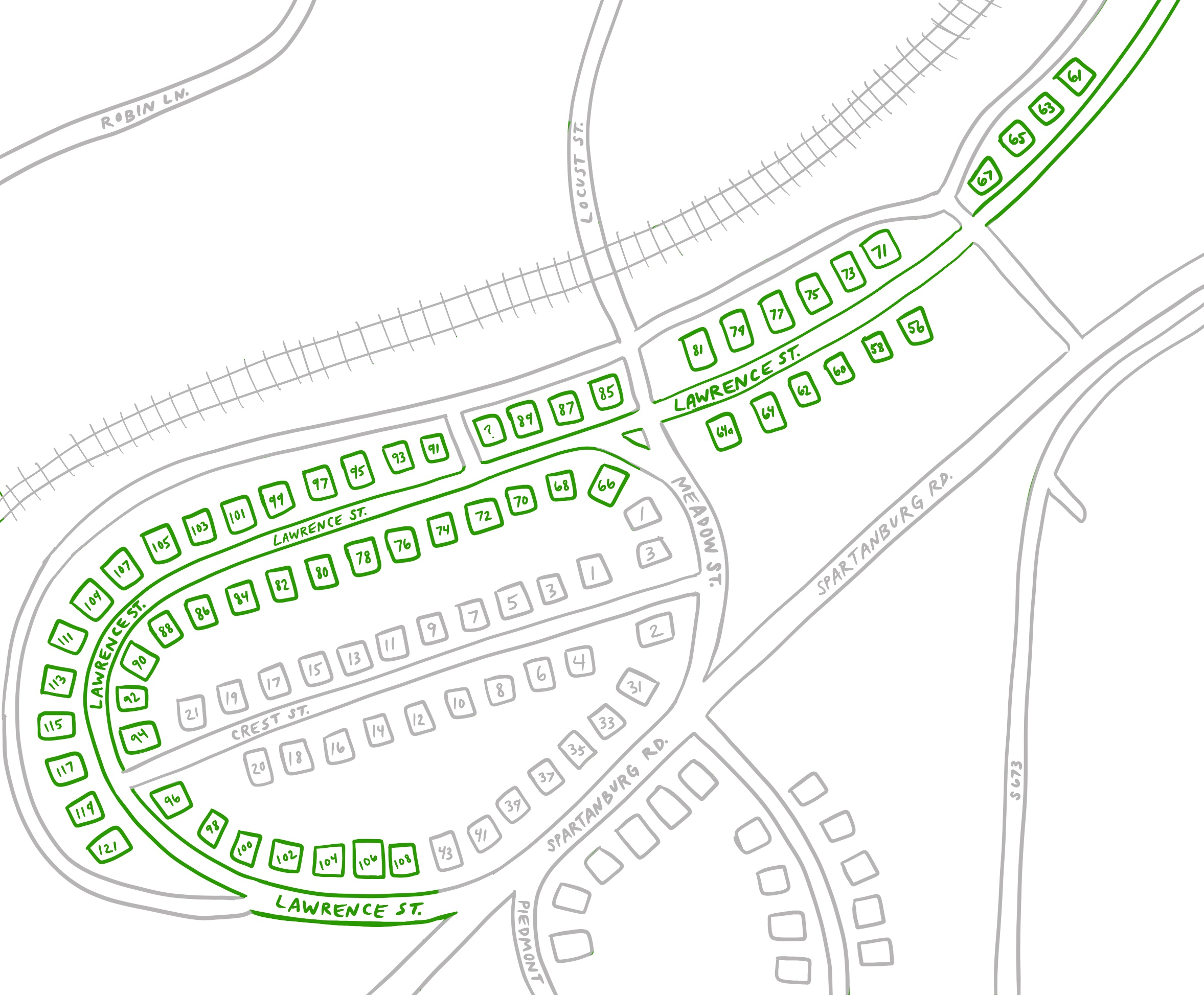
Houses on Lawrence Street

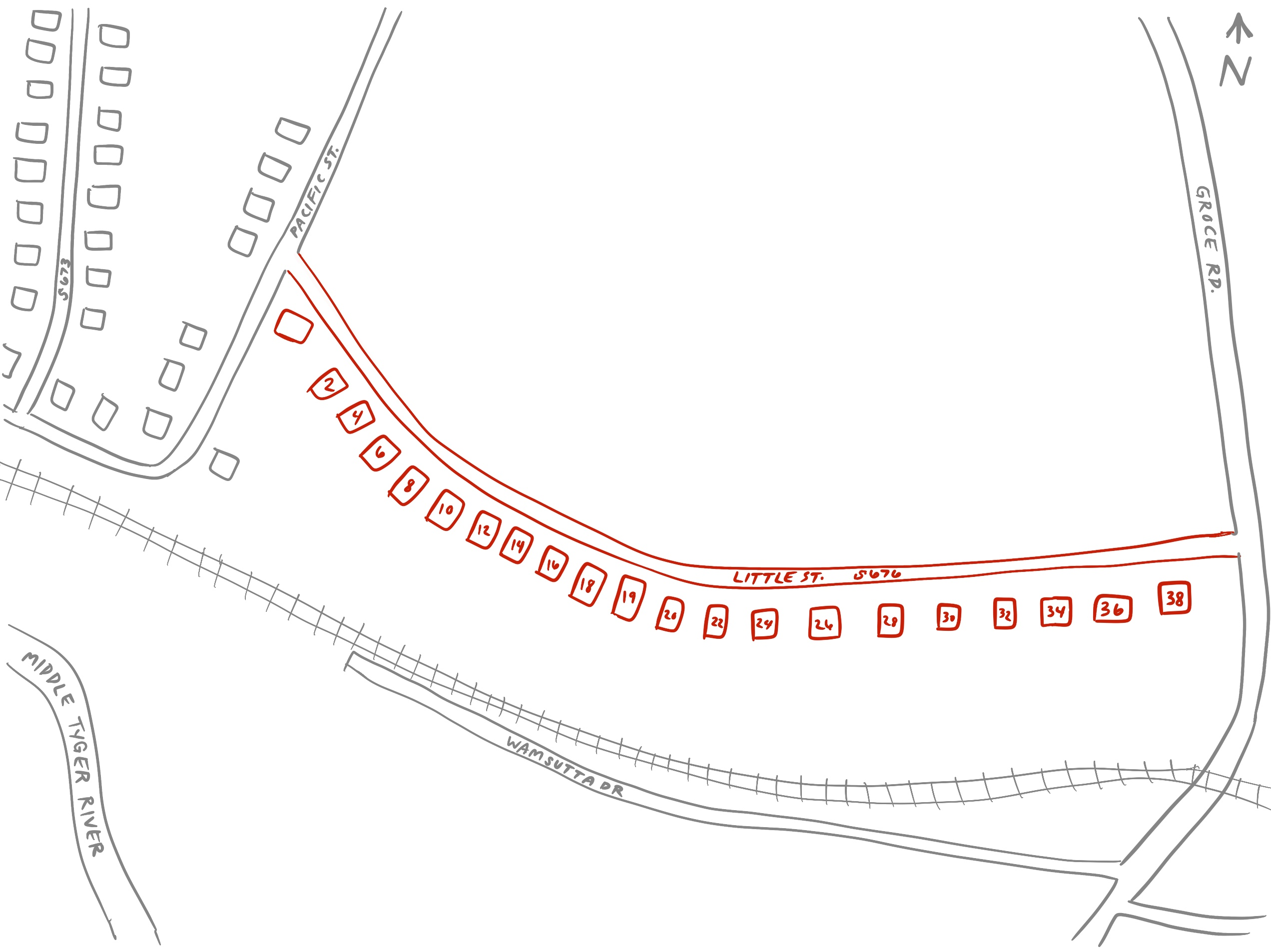
Houses on Little Street

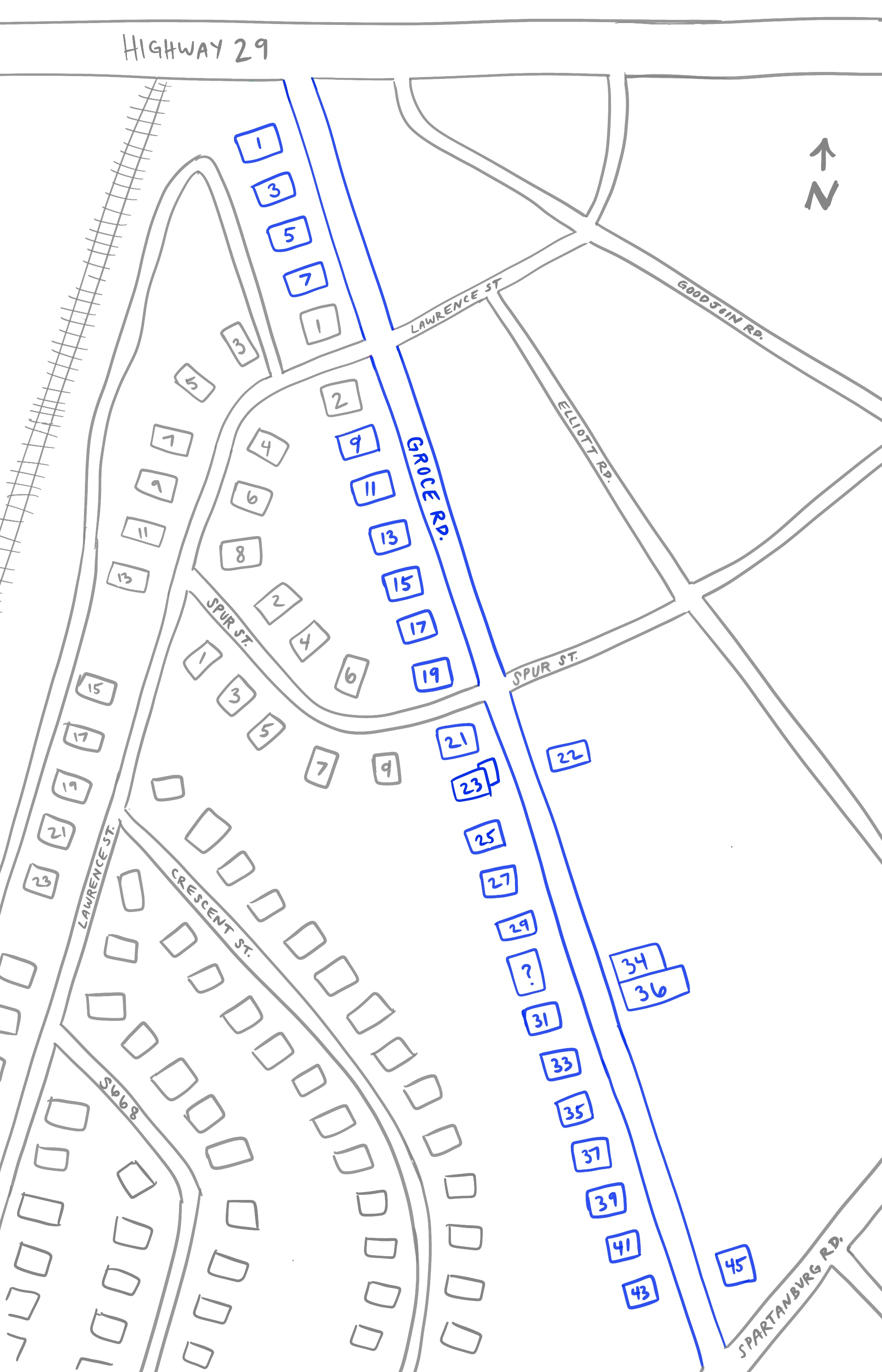
Houses on Groce Road

When Pacific Mills built the village of Lyman, they laid water mains and sewer pipes under the streets. All of the houses and buildings were hooked up to these. They therefore had indoor plumbing, with running water and sewage disposal (which in 1923 could have been considered a luxury item), then a rarity for many people in South Carolina. The sewage pipes ran from the village down to a concrete holding tank next to the river, across from where the library is today.

McMakin's Tavern was listed on the National Register of Historic Places in 1974.

== Geography ==
According to the United States Census Bureau, the town has a total area of 4.1 square miles (11 km^{2}), of which 0.25% is water.

== Demographics ==
Historical population
Census	Pop.	Note	%±
1960	1,261		—
1970	1,159		−8.1%
1980	1,067		−7.9%
1990	2,271		112.8%
2000	2,659		17.1%
2010	3,243		22.0%
2020	6,173		90.3%
U.S. Decennial Census

=== 2020 census ===
Lyman racial composition
Race	Num.	Perc.
White (non-Hispanic)	4,203	68.09%
Black or African American (non-Hispanic)	1,023	16.57%
Native American	14	0.23%
Asian	131	2.12%
Other/Mixed	292	4.73%
Hispanic or Latino	510	8.26%

As of the 2020 United States census, there were 6,173 people, 1,340 households, and 1,003 families residing in the town.

=== 2000 census ===
As of the census of 2000, there were 2,659 people, 1,137 households, and 770 families residing in the town. The population density was 654.0 inhabitants per square mile (252.5/km^{2}). There were 1,224 housing units at an average density of 301.1 per square mile (116.3/km^{2}). The racial makeup of the town was 91.69% White, 6.09% African American, 0.26% Asian, 0.11% Native American, 0.90% from other races, and 0.94% from two or more races. Hispanic or Latino people of any race were 1.47% of the population.

There were 1,137 households, out of which 27.5% had children under the age of 18 living with them, 54.2% were married couples living together, 10.7% had a female householder with no husband present, and 32.2% were non-families. 28.2% of all households were made up of individuals, and 14.2% had someone living alone who was 65 years of age or older. The average household size was 2.32 and the average family size was 2.84.

In the town, the population was spread out, with 21.4% under the age of 18, 8.1% from 18 to 24, 29.8% from 25 to 44, 23.4% from 45 to 64, and 17.2% who were 65 years of age or older. The median age was 38 years. For every 100 females, there were 90.6 males. For every 100 females age 18 and over, there were 84.9 males.

The median income for a household in the town was $38,750, and the median income for a family was $47,900. Males had a median income of $31,500 versus $22,950 for females. The per capita income for the town was $19,431. About 4.7% of families and 7.2% of the population were below the poverty line, including 10.9% of those under age 18 and 11.8% of those age 65 or over.

== Education ==
Lyman has a lending library, a branch of the Spartanburg County Public Library.
