= List of George Franklin Barber works =

The following is a chronological list of buildings designed by late-19th- and early-20th-century catalog architect, George Franklin Barber (1854–1915). Barber is best known for his houses, but also designed churches, barns, and storefronts.

== Key ==
- CS1 – Design found in Barber's The Cottage Souvenir (c. 1887–1888)
- CS2 — Design found in Barber's The Cottage Souvenir No. 2 (1891)
- CS3 — Design found in Barber's The Cottage Souvenir Revised and Enlarged (1892)
- AH — Design found in Barber's Artistic Homes: How to Plan and Build Them (1895)
- CS4 — Design found in Barber's The Cottage Souvenir, Fourth Edition, Revised (1896)
- APP — Client mentioned in Barber's Appreciation (1896)
- NMD — Design found in Barber's New Model Dwellings (1896)
- HI — Found in Barber's Homes Illustrated (1897)
- MD — Design found in Barber's Modern Dwellings and Their Proper Construction (1898)
- MD2 — Design found in Barber's Modern Dwellings and Their Proper Construction (2nd ed., 1899)
- ART — Design found in Barber's Art In Architecture (c. 1901)
- MD3 — Design found in Barber & Kluttz's Modern Dwellings: A Book of Practical Designs and Plans for Those who wish to Build or Beautify Their Homes (3rd ed., 1901)
- MD4 — Design found in Barber & Kluttz's Modern Dwellings: A Book of Practical Designs and Plans for Those who wish to Build or Beautify Their Homes (4th ed., 1904)
- MD5 — Design found in Barber & Kluttz's Modern Dwellings: A Book of Practical Designs and Plans for Those who wish to Build or Beautify Their Homes (5th ed., 1905)
- AMH5 — Design found in Barber & Kluttz's American Homes: A Book of Everything for Those who are Planning to Build or Beautify Their Homes (5th ed., 1907)
- NRHP — Listed on the National Register of Historic Places, reference number given for individual listings, and name of historic district given for contributing properties
- HABS — Documented by the Historic American Buildings Survey
- R — Remodeled by Barber, with year of remodeling given in "Completed" column

== Works ==
Completed Works table
Name	City	State/Country	Completed	Status	Other information	Image	Reference
Charles Bradt House (220 S. Fourth St.)	DeKalb	Illinois	1888	Demolished	CS2 #41		
Clendenen-Carleton House (803 N. Main St.)	Bonham	Texas	1888	Standing	Carpentry and Building magazine, Nov. 1888		
Congregational Church	DeKalb	Illinois	1888	Standing	Currently home to a Foursquare congregation		
William G. Earle House (202 Fisk Ave.)	DeKalb	Illinois	1888 (approx.)	Standing	Carpentry and Building 10 (Nov. 1888) Plate 43		
716 E. Ludington Avenue	Ludington	Michigan	1888	Standing	CS2 #33		
902 W. Main Street	White Sulphur Springs	Montana	1888 (approx.)	Standing	CS2 #41		
	La Porte	Indiana	1889 (approx.)		CS2 #16		
8 College Street	York	South Carolina	1889	Standing	MD3 #44		
305 N. Detroit Street	Lagrange	Indiana	1889	Standing	CS2 #36		
George F. Barber House (1635 Washington Ave.)	Knoxville	Tennessee	1889	Standing	CS2 #60; NRHP contributing property (Park City Historic District); Barber lived here 1889–1895		
W.A. Beal House	Salem	Indiana	1889 (approx.)		CS2 #27		
Alonzo Cash House (1712 Washington Ave.)	Knoxville	Tennessee	1889	Standing	CS1 #3; NRHP contributing property (Park City Historic District)		
E. Dean Dow House (1723 Washington Ave.)	Knoxville	Tennessee	1889 (approx.)	Demolished	CS2 #47		
W.B. Earthman House	Murfreesboro	Tennessee	1889 (approx.)	Standing	CS2 #56		
Davis J. Egleston House (933 N. Fourth Ave.)	Knoxville	Tennessee	1889 (approx.)	Demolished	CS2 #56		
J.E. Hatch House (10680 Freedom St.)	Garrettsville	Ohio	1889 (approx.)	Standing	CS2 #43 (No. 2)		
Wayne L. Haworth House (1702 Washington Ave.)	Knoxville	Tennessee	1889 (approx.)	Standing	CS2 #43; NRHP contributing property (Park City Historic District)		
W.O. Haworth House (1724 Washington Ave.)	Knoxville	Tennessee	1889	Standing	CS2 #35; NRHP contributing property (Park City Historic District)		
Hochstedler House (237 SE 6th Ave.)	Albany	Oregon	1889	Standing	CS2 #41		
H.H. Kincaid House (1735 Washington Ave.)	Knoxville	Tennessee	1889 (approx.)	Demolished	CS2 #1		
F.E. McArthur House (1701 Jefferson Ave.)	Knoxville	Tennessee	1889	Standing	CS2 #40; NRHP contributing property (Park City Historic District)		
John H. Nelson House	Murfreesboro	Tennessee	1889 (approx.)		CS2 #51; MD3 p. 81, 83; HI pp. 39–41		
Ira W. Olive House (401 E. 13th St.)	Lexington	Nebraska	1889	Standing	CS2 #41		
On-the-Hill (982 Jefferson St.)	Boydton	Virginia	1889 (approx.)	Standing	R; NRHP contributing property (Boydton Historic District)		
Joseph T. Potter House (1730 Washington Ave.)	Knoxville	Tennessee	1889	Standing	NRHP contributing property (Park City Historic District)		
C.F. Richardson House	Athol	Massachusetts	1889 (approx.)		CS2 #15		
J.H. Setchel House (9140 E. Main Rd.)	Cuba	New York	1889 (approx.)	Standing	CS2 #55		
William Weiss House	Beaumont	Texas	1889 (approx.)		CS2 #41		
J.C. White House (1705 Washington Avenue)	Knoxville	Tennessee	1889 (approx.)	Altered	CS2 #54		
George R. Wright House (1708 Jefferson Ave.)	Knoxville	Tennessee	1889 (approx.)	Altered	CS2 #39		
632 Fifth Street	Carrollton	Illinois	1880s	Standing	CS2 #25		
1731 Jefferson Avenue	Knoxville	Tennessee	1880s	Standing	NRHP contributing property (Park City Historic District)		
2038 Jefferson Avenue	Knoxville	Tennessee	1880s	Standing	NRHP contributing property (Park City Historic District)		
B.F. Poteet House (512 Beaumont Ave.)	Harrodsburg	Kentucky	1880s	Standing	CS4 #29; NRHP contributing property (Beaumont Avenue Residential District)		
	DeKalb	Illinois	1890 (approx.)	Standing	CS2 #43		
	Elwood	Indiana	1890 (approx.)	Standing	CS2 #60		
106 S. Wayne Street	Warren	Indiana	1890	Standing	CS2 #33		
153 W. Third Street	Peru	Indiana	1890 (approx.)	Standing	CS3 #128		
212 S. Main Street	Gordon	Texas	1890 (approx.)	Standing	CS2 #2		
312 S. Monroe Street	Streator	Illinois	1890 (approx.)	Standing			
343 W. Upton Avenue	Reed City	Michigan	1890 (approx.)	Standing	CS2 #33		
405 E. Main Street	Du Quoin	Illinois	1890 (approx.)	Standing			
426 College Avenue	Grand Rapids	Michigan	1890	Standing			
491 Crow Road	Franklin	Illinois	1890	Burned	MD3 #44		
603 W. Fifth St.	Vinton	Iowa	1890 (approx.)	Standing	MD3 #37		
802 N. Fifth Avenue	Knoxville	Tennessee	1890 (approx.)	Demolished	CS2 #43		
802 William Street	Cape Girardeau	Missouri	1890 (approx.)	Standing			
806 N. Fifth Avenue	Knoxville	Tennessee	1890 (approx.)	Demolished	CS2 #38		
816 N. Fourth Avenue	Knoxville	Tennessee	1890 (approx.)	Standing	CS2 #36; NRHP contributing property (Fourth and Gill Historic District)		
817 S. Clark Street	Moberly	Missouri	1890 (approx.)	Standing	CS2 #56		
821 Deery Street	Knoxville	Tennessee	1890 (approx.)	Standing	MD3 #36-E; NRHP contributing property (Fourth and Gill Historic District)		
1001 White Street	Canton	Missouri	1890	Standing			
1215 Eighth Street	Port Huron	Michigan	1890 (approx.)	Standing	CS2 #33		
1501 Woodbine Avenue	Knoxville	Tennessee	1890 (approx.)	Standing	CS2 #9		
1640 Jefferson Avenue	Knoxville	Tennessee	1890	Standing	MD #264; NRHP contributing property (Park City Historic District)		
1707 Jefferson Avenue	Knoxville	Tennessee	1890 (approx.)	Demolished	CS2 #38		
1806 Washington Avenue	Knoxville	Tennessee	1890	Standing	CS3 #124; NRHP contributing property (Park City Historic District)		
1810 Glenwood Avenue	Knoxville	Tennessee	1890 (approx.)	Standing	CS2 #9		
1912 Washington Avenue	Knoxville	Tennessee	1890	Standing	NRHP contributing property (Park City Historic District)		
2039 Jefferson Avenue	Knoxville	Tennessee	1890 (approx.)	Standing	CS3 #125 plan #2; NRHP contributing property (Park City Historic District)		
2103 Seventh Street	Harlan	Iowa	1890 (approx.)	Standing			
2458 Woodbine Avenue	Knoxville	Tennessee	1890	Standing	NRHP contributing property (Park City Historic District)		
7620 E. Highway X	Clinton	Wisconsin	1890 (approx.)	Standing	CS2 #41		
8659 N. High Street	Mineral City	Ohio	1890 (approx.)	Standing			
W.W. Adams House (212 Augusta Hwy.)	Edgefield	South Carolina	1890 (approx.)	Standing	MD3 #37		
Barber House (16 W. Pulteney Sq.)	Bath	New York	1890 (approx.)	Standing	CS2 #33		
Blood House (89 Bunker Hill St.)	Lancaster	New Hampshire	1890 (approx.)	Standing			
Bullock House (253 Spring St.)	Eureka Springs	Arkansas	1890 (approx.)	Standing	CS2 #37		
Burgess-Bell House (803 St. Lawrence St.)	Gonzales	Texas	1890 (approx.)	Standing	CS2 #44		
Charles J. Burton House	Gloversville	New York	1890 (approx.)	Standing	CS2 #33		
Dean House (407 W. Main St.)	Ava	Illinois	1890 (approx.)	Standing	CS2 #56		
Dr. George Eadie House (530 W. Main St.)	Lock Haven	Pennsylvania	1890 (approx.)	Standing			
Isaac Newton Ellis House (258 S. Extension St.)	Hazlehurst	Mississippi	1890 (approx.)	Destroyed by fire	NRHP (#87001914)		
Emminga House (904 Prairie Mills Rd.)	Golden	Illinois	1890 (approx.)	Standing	MD3 #37		
Fardy House (215 S. Division St.)	Janesville	Wisconsin	1890 (approx.)	Standing	CS2 #41		
T.W. Fisk House (737 N. Third Ave.)	Knoxville	Tennessee	1890 (approx.)	Demolished	CS2 #2		
Flack House (154 S. Monroe St.)	Tiffin	Ohio	1890 (approx.)	Standing	CS2 #53		
Frazer-Ansley House (206 S. Prairie St.)	Union Springs	Alabama	1890	Standing	CS2		
Gross-Dial House (Poplar St.)	Honey Grove	Texas	1890	Standing	American Homes, Jan. 1895		
Swartz House (The Keyhole House) (1016 Main St.)	Natchez	Mississippi	1890	Standing	CS2 #36		
Thomas McClure House (402 W. Prospect St.)	Kewanee	Illinois	1890 (approx.)	Standing	CS2 #33		
Mollen House (203 W. Lincoln Ave.)	Little Chute	Wisconsin	1890 (approx.)	Standing			
Morgan House (532 N. Walnut St.)	Bloomington	Indiana	1890	Standing	CS2 #41; NRHP (#83000140)		
Newman House (904 W. Willow St.)	Chippewa Falls	Wisconsin	1890	Standing	CS2 #36		
Charles S. Peach House (39 Hall St.)	North Adams	Massachusetts	1890	Standing	CS2 #41		
Person-McGhee House (5631 Capital Blvd.)	Franklinton	North Carolina	1890	Standing	R		
Melville P. Reeve House (208 N. College St.)	Greeneville	Tennessee	1890 (approx.)	Standing			
D.D. Remer House (1618 Washington Ave.)	Knoxville	Tennessee	1890	Standing	CS2 #33; NMD #65B; NRHP contributing property (Park City Historic District)		
Rich House (300 S. Main St.)	Barre	Massachusetts	1890 (approx.)	Standing	MD3 #31		
John Robinson House	Ware	Massachusetts	1890 (approx.)	Standing			
Roslyn (Andrew and Mary Elizabeth Gray House) (1135 Catherine St.)	Victoria	British Columbia, Canada	1890	Standing	CS2 #60		
Rowan House (818 Warren Ave.)	Belvidere	Illinois	1890 (approx.)	Standing			
Ruffing House (E. Franklin St.)	Delphi	Indiana	1890 (approx.)	Standing	CS2 #44		
John W. Ryan House (S. Monroe St.)	Muncie	Indiana	1890	Standing			
Milo Smith House (213 5th Ave.)	Troy	New York	1890	Standing	MD		
Spruce Cottage at Thompson House (19 State Route 296)	Windham	New York	1890 (approx.)	Standing			
Thompson House (240 N. Main St.)	Canandaigua	New York	1890 (approx.)	Standing			
W.B. Trent House (825 N. Fifth Ave.)	Knoxville	Tennessee	1890	Demolished	CS2 #37/55		
Walker House (315 W. Bridge St.)	Granbury	Texas	1890 (approx.)	Standing	CS3 #132		
Jesse J. and Mary F. Allee House (202 640th St.)	Newell	Iowa	1891	Standing			
E.A. Blount House (North St.)	Nacogdoches	Texas	1891 (approx.)	Demolished	CS2 #53		
Harris House (118 Sinclair St.)	Janesville	Wisconsin	1891	Standing	MD3 #31		
McCubbins-McCanless House (424 Park Ave.)	Salisbury	North Carolina	1891	Standing	CS2 #36		
Skipton House (416 SE 4th St.)	Albany	Oregon	1891	Standing	CS2 #11		
Joseph G. Stansfield House (230 E. 6th St.)	Mount Carmel	Illinois	1891	Standing	MD3 #37		
	Aurora	Illinois	1892 (approx.)		CS2 #10		
	Gibson City	Illinois	1892 (approx.)	Standing	CS2 #41		
	Brocton	New York	1892 (approx.)	Demolished	CS2 #33		
	Gouverneur	New York	1892 (approx.)	Standing	CS2 #1 (modified)		
	Ilion	New York	1892 (approx.)		CS2 #14		
12 Walnut Street	Ware	Massachusetts	1892 (approx.)	Standing	CS2 #11		
14 Walnut Street	Ware	Massachusetts	1892 (approx.)	Standing	CS2 #11		
24 Brookes Avenue	Gaithersburg	Maryland	1892 (approx.)	Standing	CS2 #38		
106 Corsicana Street	Hillsboro	Texas	1892 (approx.)	Standing			
111 Euclid Avenue	Lynn	Massachusetts	1892 (approx.)	Standing	CS2 #36		
118 N. Jefferson Street	Ionia	Michigan	1892 (approx.)	Standing	CS2 #14		
208 Lake Shore Drive	Culver	Indiana	1892 (approx.)	Standing	CS2 #14		
209 N. Main Street	Jefferson	Wisconsin	1892 (approx.)	Standing	CS2 #36		
222 W. Main Street	Shelby	Ohio	1892 (approx.)	Standing			
265 Prospect Street	Manchester	New Hampshire	1892 (approx.)	Standing	CS2 #24		
301 S. Cedar Street	Townsend	Montana	1892	Standing	CS2 #56		
400 E. Franklin Street	Taylorville	Illinois	1892 (approx.)	Standing	CS2 #41		
401 Michigan Avenue	South Haven	Michigan	1892 (approx.)	Standing	CS2 #44		
403 E. Hickory Street	Fairbury	Illinois	1892 (approx.)	Standing	CS2 #41		
413 Church Street	North Adams	Massachusetts	1892	Standing	NMD #58B; MD #10		
415 E. Market Street	Cadiz	Ohio	1892 (approx.)	Standing	CS2 #15		
425 N. Seventh Street	Fort Smith	Arkansas	1892 (approx.)	Standing	CS2 #41		
452 W. State Street	Hartford	Wisconsin	1892 (approx.)	Standing	CS2 #14		
621 E. Hurlbut Avenue	Belvidere	Illinois	1892 (approx.)	Standing	CS2 #22		
624 Caswell Street	Belvidere	Illinois	1892 (approx.)	Standing	CS2 #22		
635 E. Madison Street	Belvidere	Illinois	1892 (approx.)	Standing	CS2 #22		
807 Caswell Street	Belvidere	Illinois	1892 (approx.)	Standing	CS2 #22		
2216 Raymond Avenue	Missoula	Montana	1892 (approx.)	Standing	CS2 #37		
5280 Vickery Street	Lavonia	Georgia	1892 (approx.)	Standing	CS2 #1		
10399 Clinton Avenue	North Rose	New York	1892 (approx.)	Standing	MD3 #41		
Dr. Judson O. Ball House (500 W. Monroe St.)	Mount Pleasant	Iowa	1892	Standing	CS2 #33; NRHP (#94000404)		
Blair Titman Banker House (202 Greenwich St.)	Belvidere	New Jersey	1892	Standing	CS2 #53		
Bowe House (183 3rd Street)	Fond du Lac	Wisconsin	1892 (approx.)	Standing	CS2 #40		
John J. Carman House (42 Park Ave.)	Bay Shore	New York	1892	Standing	NMD #48B		
Captain Harry Chester, Jr. House (656 Petersburg Rd.)	Woodbine	New Jersey	1892	Standing	CS2 #15		
Clayton House (200 Hatton St.)	Portsmouth	Virginia	1892 (approx.)	Standing	CS2 #53		
Crawford House (25 Main St.)	Delhi	New York	1892 (approx.)	Standing	CS2 #44		
Dawson House (23 Washington Rd.)	Woodbury	Connecticut	1892 (approx.)	Standing	CS2 #15		
Drew House (442 W. Prairie Ave.)	Decatur	Illinois	1892 (approx.)	Standing	CS3 #27		
Dudley-McFarland House (895 Seventh St.)	Charleston	Illinois	1892	Standing			
Easter House (652 Union Hwy.)	Cross Anchor	South Carolina	1892 (approx.)	Standing	MD3 #36-E		
Dr. Normal B. Ervin House (316 W. Madison St.)	Gibsonburg	Ohio	1892 (approx.)	Standing	CS2 #36		
J.Q. Gant House	Elon College	North Carolina	1892 (approx.)	Demolished			
J. Hawkins Hart House (630 Center St.)	Henderson	Kentucky	1892	Standing	NRHP (#11000005)		
David Hoover House (220 E. Market St.)	Taylorville	Illinois	1892	Standing	NMD #73		
Charles R. Hunt House (811 Poplar St.)	Atlantic	Iowa	1892	Standing	CS2 #36		
Clarence King House (519 Alabama Ave.)	Bristol	Tennessee	1892 (approx.)	Standing	MD3 #44		
Loughan House (614 Fourth St.)	Radford	Virginia	1892 (approx.)	Standing	CS2 #36		
Magruder House (691 S. Chicago Ave.)	Kankakee	Illinois	1892	Standing			
Maynard Mansion (1151 Minnesota Ave.)	San Jose	California	1892 (approx.)	Standing			
The Mayor's House (4th & Walnut)	Mound City	Illinois	1892 (approx.)	Standing	CS2 #33		
Mertz House (723 N. Anglin St.)	Cleburne	Texas	1892	Standing			
S.B. Newman House (522 E. Scott Ave.)	Knoxville	Tennessee	1892	Altered	NRHP contributing property (Old North Knoxville Historic District); Newman printed many of Barber's catalogs		
David B. Nowels House (500 N. McKinley Ave.)	Rensselaer	Indiana	1892 (approx.)	Standing	CS2 #14		
Jeremiah Nunan House (635 N. Oregon St.)	Jacksonville	Oregon	1892	Standing	NRHP contributing property (Jacksonville Historic District); HABS (OR-109); NMD #73		
Eugene and Olivia Payne House	Iowa City	Iowa	1892	Standing			
Pearsall House (111 W. Pearsall St.)	Dunn	North Carolina	1892 (approx.)	Standing			
Pepper House (707 N. Main St.)	Belvidere	Illinois	1892 (approx.)	Standing	CS2 #36		
Lonnie A. Pope House (206 W. Jackson St.)	Douglas	Georgia	1892 (approx.)	Standing	MD #212; NRHP (#82002395)		
F.P. Powell House (W. Marvin and Bryson St.)	Waxahachie	Texas	1892	Demolished	CS2 #56		
Wallace A. Preston House (720 State St.)	Saint Joseph	Michigan	1892	Standing	CS2 #53		
George M. Roueche House (762 Park Ave.)	Meadville	Pennsylvania	1892	Standing	CS3 #27; NMD #73		
William Henry Scales House (608 Magnolia Dr.)	Macon	Mississippi	1892	Standing	xxx #4; NRHP (#02000858)		
Henry Schoh House (401 1st St. NW)	Elkader	Iowa	1892	Standing			
James & Eliza Schutt House (Gable House) (805 E. Fifth Ave.)	Durango	Colorado	1892	Standing	CS2 #53		
Singhi House (172 Broadway)	Rockland	Maine	1892 (approx.)	Standing	CS2 #17		
James B. Smith House (503 N. Market St.)	Van Wert	Ohio	1892	Standing	CS2 #36		
James H. Smith House (287 W. Hail St.)	Bushnell	Illinois	1892 (approx.)	Standing	CS2 #41		
Smith House (71 Summer St.)	Rockland	Maine	1892 (approx.)	Standing	CS2 #24		
Captain Storm House (145 E. Main St.)	Westfield	New York	1892	Standing	MD3 #2-E		
Tousley House (501 Logan Ave.)	Belvidere	Illinois	1892 (approx.)	Standing			
Lewis and Elizabeth Van Vleet House (202 NE Graham St.)	Portland	Oregon	1892	Standing	CS2 #36		
Villa Colonia Mayor Hanson House (Northport Ave.)	Belfast	Maine	1892	Burned			
Williams House (55 Summer St.)	Rockland	Maine	1892 (approx.)	Standing	CS2 #54		
Williams Carriage House (55 Summer St.)	Rockland	Maine	1892 (approx.)	Standing	CS2 #64 (modified)		
Isaac Ziegler House (712 N. Fourth Ave.)	Knoxville	Tennessee	1892	Demolished	MD3 #41; NRHP (#75001765); HABS (TN-216)		
Louis Ziegler House (108 N. Broad St.)	Edenton	North Carolina	1892 (approx.)	Standing	NRHP contributing property (Edenton Historic District)		
	San Bernardino	California	1893 (approx.)		CS3 #18		
Ballange Street	Hinton	West Virginia	1893 (approx.)	Standing	CS3 #128		
4 E. Walnut Street	Piper City	Illinois	1893 (approx.)	Standing	CS3 #128		
201 W. 37th Street	Savannah	Georgia	1893	Standing	CS2 #33		
203 W. Center Street	Lebanon	Illinois	1893 (approx.)	Standing	CS3 #128		
211 S. Third Street	Delavan	Wisconsin	1893 (approx.)	Standing	CS3 #128		
403 N. Fifth Street	DeKalb	Illinois	1893	Standing			
604 E. Franklin Street	Delphi	Indiana	1893	Standing	CS2 #25		
626 N. Third Street	Danville	Kentucky	1893	Standing	MD3 #41 (modified)		
2343 Washington Avenue	Knoxville	Tennessee	1893	Standing	CS2 #38		
Andrus House (1638 E. 1st Ave.)	Albany	Oregon	1893	Standing	CS2 #44 modified		
Backhaus House (9376 Old Fond du Lac Rd.)	Kewaskum	Wisconsin	1893 (approx.)	Standing	CS3 #128		
C.W. Barrett House (913 Chickamauga Ave.)	Knoxville	Tennessee	1893 (approx.)	Standing	CS3 #12		
Edwin Barthold House (308 W. Couts)	Weatherford	Texas	1893	Standing	HI pp. 74–76; CS2 #56		
Brehaut House (2070 San Jose Ave.)	Alameda	California	1893	Standing	CS3 #27		
Benjamin F. Bulloch House (47 Bulloch St.)	Warm Springs	Georgia	1893	Standing	MD3 #27-E		
John T. and Marietta Carey House (1502 1st Ave. N)	Denison	Iowa	1893 (approx.)	Standing	NRHP (#05000276)		
James W. Coleman House (2458 Sylvester Hwy.)	Moultrie	Georgia	1893	Standing	R; NRHP (#83003555)		
William Houston Craig House (1250 Conner St.)	Noblesville	Indiana	1893	Standing			
W.O. Crouse House (1526 Cason St.)	Lafayette	Indiana	1893	Standing	CS2 #36		
Dalton House (2330 H St.)	Sacramento	California	1893 (approx.)	Standing	CS3 #128		
Joshua Deaver House (1803 Washington Ave.)	Knoxville	Tennessee	1893	Standing	NMD #60B; NRHP contributing property (Park City Historic District)		
John P. Donnelly House (535 N. Donnelly St.)	Mount Dora	Florida	1893	Standing	NRHP (#75000560)		
Downes-Aldrich House (206 N. 7th St.)	Crockett	Texas	1893	Standing	CS2 #53		
John Drisko House (1314 Grand Ave.)	Wausau	Wisconsin	1893 (approx.)	Standing	CS3 #128		
Edwin James Jenkins House (607 E. 27th St.)	Bryan	Texas	1893	Standing	MD3 #36		
J.O. Justice House	Bushnell	Illinois	1893 (approx.)		Artistic Homes, 1893		
A.E. Kelly House (1140 W. Adams Blvd.)	Los Angeles	California	1893	Standing	NMD #73		
John Granger Linsay House (935 E. College St.)	Iowa City	Iowa	1893	Standing	NRHP (#77000529)		
Oramil McHenry House (Bald Eagle Ranch House) (511 Crawford Rd.)	Modesto	California	1893	Standing	CS2 #36; NRHP (#13001069)		
Mills House (Heights Blvd.)	Houston	Texas	1893	Demolished	CS2 #56		
E.B. Munson House	New Haven	Connecticut	1893 (approx.)		Artistic Homes, 1893, p. 29		
Pecan Place (503 S. College St.)	Trenton	Tennessee	1893	Standing	R; CS2 #36		
Israel Platt Pardee Mansion (235 N. Laurel St. and 28 Aspen St.)	Hazleton	Pennsylvania	1893	Standing	NRHP (#84003487)		
Mary Steele Scales House (126 E. Steele St.)	Salisbury	North Carolina	1893 (approx.)	Standing	CS2 #12		
Charles W. Schaff House (197 W. High St.)	Mount Gilead	Ohio	1893	Standing	CS2 #1		
Dr. Leamington Stewart House	Chesaning	Michigan	1893 (approx.)	Standing	CS2 #53		
Isaac P. Van Cise House (603 E. Monroe St.)	Mount Pleasant	Iowa	1893 (approx.)	Standing	CS3 #128		
Edward L. White House (37850 Euclid Ave.)	Willoughby	Ohio	1893	Standing	CS2 #15		
Matthew H. White House	Hertford	North Carolina	1893	Demolished			
Williams-Erwin House (Marvin Ave.)	Waxahachie	Texas	1893	Standing	CS2 #56 (modified)		
117 Willow Avenue	Laurium	Michigan	1894	Standing			
1303 Main Street	La Crosse	Wisconsin	1894	Standing			
2036 SE Taylor Street	Portland	Oregon	1894	Standing	MD3 #41		
William Ackerman House (601 E. High St.)	Mount Vernon	Ohio	1894	Standing	ART #562		
E.F. Aydlett House (Main St. & Pool St.)	Elizabeth City	North Carolina	1894 (approx.)	Demolished			
Jeremiah Beattie House (30 J St.)	Salt Lake City	Utah	1894	Standing	CS2 #33		
Alvin Bushnell Bell House (310 Quimby St.)	Ida Grove	Iowa	1894	Standing	NRHP (#83000369)		
Dougherty House (1074 Eastside Hwy.)	Corvallis	Montana	1894	Standing	CS2 #37		
Joseph Cone House (305 S. Jennings St.)	North Vernon	Indiana	1894	Standing	MD3 #4-E; NRHP contributing property (State Street Historic District)		
Joseph B. Haden House (603 W. Bonham St.)	Ladonia	Texas	1894	Standing	CS2 #1; NRHP (#80004118)		
Dr. Walter F. and Hattie Hammond House	Grinnell	Iowa	1894	Standing	NRHP		
T.G. Henderson House (207 S. Marion St.)	Lake City	Florida	1894	Standing	CS2 #56; NRHP (#73000571)		
Kramer-McMullen House (709 Poindexter St.)	Elizabeth City	North Carolina	1894	Standing			
George W. Lowry House (126 S. Broadway)	Hastings	Michigan	1894	Standing	CS3 #128		
J. Harry McMurray House, Grinnell Historical Museum	Grinnell	Iowa	1894	Standing	NRHP		
John J. Metcalfe House (520 N. College)	Waxahachie	Texas	1894	Altered	NMD #84		
William Alexander Sombart House (623 High St.)	Boonville	Missouri	1894	Standing	CS2 #34		
Samuel Spitler House (14 Market St.)	Brookville	Ohio	1894	Standing	CS2 #60; NRHP (#73001507)		
William Henry Stark House (611 W. Green Ave.)	Orange	Texas	1894	Standing	CS2 #53, modified		
Stark Carriage House (611 W. Green Ave.)	Orange	Texas	1894 (approx.)	Standing	NMD #95B		
S.T. Stevenson House (2012 N St.)	Belleville	Kansas	1894	Standing	MD3 #2-E; HI pp. 26–27; NRHP (#10000451)		
John Wheeler Truesdell House (500 N. McBride St.)	Syracuse	New York	1894	Standing			
Zachariah Weller House (824 Kensington Ave.)	Los Angeles	California	1894	Standing			
James D. Wilkins House (225 W. Oak St.)	Campbellsburg	Indiana	1894	Standing	CS2 #33		
George F. Winslow House (210 Oakwood Pl.)	Eau Claire	Wisconsin	1894	Standing	NRHP (#78000094) CS3 #27		
	Chicago	Illinois	1895 (approx.)		HI pp. 62–63; MD3 #15		
	Muncie	Indiana	1895 (approx.)	Standing	CS2 #33		
		New York	1895 (approx.)		HI pp. 42–43		
Heights Boulevard (between 8th and 9th Aves.)	Houston	Texas	1895 (approx.)	Demolished	CS2 #1		
Sixteenth Avenue at Rutland Street	Houston	Texas	1895 (approx.)	Demolished	CS2 #2		
151 Park Avenue	Grayslake	Illinois	1895 (approx.)	Standing	CS2 #15		
189 W. Morgan Street	Martinsville	Indiana	1895 (approx.)	Standing	CS2 #40		
204 S. State Street	North Vernon	Indiana	1895 (approx.)	Standing	MD3 #4-E		
219 E. Franklin Street	Anderson	South Carolina	1895	Standing	CS2 #41		
310 S. State Street	North Vernon	Indiana	1895 (approx.)	Standing			
316 Gingerbread Lane	Chireno	Texas	1895 (approx.)	Standing	CS2 #15		
325 Eighth Street	Cairo	Illinois	1895 (approx.)	Standing			
402 W. First Street N.	Wenona	Illinois	1895 (approx.)	Standing	NMD #58B		
517 S. Main Street	Anna	Illinois	1895 (approx.)	Standing			
605 Girard Street	Metropolis	Illinois	1895 (approx.)	Standing			
605 S. Highland Avenue	Chanute	Kansas	1895 (approx.)	Standing	MD3 #4-E		
607 S. Main Street	Anna	Illinois	1895 (approx.)	Standing			
608 Rome Street	Carrollton	Georgia	1895 (approx.)	Standing	CS2 #45		
717 Talbot Street	Taylor	Texas	1895	Standing			
1603 Jefferson Avenue	Knoxville	Tennessee	1895 (approx.)	Standing	NMD #60B; NRHP contributing property (Park City Historic District)		
1603 N. Water Street	Decatur	Illinois	1895 (approx.)	Standing			
1620 Madison Street	Comer	Georgia	1895	Standing	CS2 #45		
1704 Washington Avenue	Knoxville	Tennessee	1895	Standing	NMD #37B; NRHP contributing property (Park City Historic District)		
1802 Washington Avenue	Knoxville	Tennessee	1895	Standing	NRHP contributing property (Park City Historic District)		
2130 Broadway Extension	Hannibal	Missouri	1895 (approx.)	Standing	CS2 #44		
2948 Main Street	East Troy	Wisconsin	1895 (approx.)	Standing	NMD #57B		
W.C. Arthurs House (800 North St.)	Mount Vernon	Illinois	1895	Standing			
Aston House (221 E. Bridge St.)	Granbury	Texas	1895 (approx.)	Standing	MD3 #4-E		
Bailey House (28 S. Seventh St.)	Fernandina Beach	Florida	1895	Standing	NRHP (#73000591)		
Beall House (1700 Liberty St.)	Alton	Illinois	1895	Standing	CS2 #36		
J.B. Binford House	Estherville	Iowa	1895 (approx.)		HI pp. 66–67		
Julius Boesel House	New Bremen	Ohio	1895	Standing	CS2 #53		
I.N. Bushong House	Leipsic	Ohio	1895 (approx.)		HI pp. 80–81		
Chipley-Murrah House (207 W. Harris St.)	Pine Mountain	Georgia	1895	Standing	CS2 #56		
Charlie Coleman House (E. Tyler St.)	Athens	Texas	1895 (approx.)	Demolished	CS2 #1		
Charles S. Craig House (414 N. Central Ave.)	Richland Center	Wisconsin	1895	Standing	MD3 #41		
Dawes House (406 S. Melcher St.)	Johnstown	New York	1895 (approx.)	Standing	NMD #58B		
Dixon-Powell House (304 S. Granville St.)	Edenton	North Carolina	1895	Standing	NRHP contributing property (Edenton Historic District)		
Charles and Anna Drain House (500 S. Main St.)	Drain	Oregon	1895	Standing	CS2 #37		
Benjamin N. Duke House	Durham	North Carolina	1895 (approx.)	Demolished			
Dunaway-Meyer House (Academy St.)	Orrville	Alabama	1895	Standing	American Homes, May 1896; Alabama Register 1978		
C.B. Edwards House	Raleigh	North Carolina	1895 (approx.)	Demolished	HI pp. 70–71		
Fitton House (831 Main St.)	New Harmony	Indiana	1895 (approx.)	Standing	CS2 #36		
Foy-Beasley-Hamilton House (424 N. Eufaula Ave.)	Eufaula	Alabama	1895	Standing			
Garvin House (849 Main St.)	Sanford	Maine	1895 (approx.)	Standing	MD3 #41		
Glen Oaks (LaFollette House) (201 S. Indiana Ave.)	LaFollette	Tennessee	1895	Standing	NRHP (#75001736, listed as "LaFollette House"), 27-room mansion of Harvey LaFollette		
William Grant House (291 Prospect St.)	Willimantic	Connecticut	1895	Standing			
William W. Gray House (119 N. Court St.)	Grayville	Illinois	1895 (approx.)	Standing	NMD #71B; NRHP (#92000049)		
William W. Gray Carriage House (119 N. Court St.)	Grayville	Illinois	1895 (approx.)	Standing	NMD #71B; NRHP (#92000049)		
Martin T. Gunderson House (101 Gunderson Blvd.)	Kenyon	Minnesota	1895	Standing	MD3 #9-E		
Hammer House (560 Water Ave.)	Hillsboro	Wisconsin	1895 (approx.)	Standing	MD3 #2-E		
John Harvey House (175 N. Seminary St.)	Madisonville	Kentucky	1895 (approx.)	Standing	CS2 #36; NRHP (#88002731)		
Frank Hicks House (Breckinridge St.)	Blandinsville	Illinois	1895	Standing	NMD #56B; MD3 #8-E		
William Hosford House (3209 Hwy. 77N)	Waxahachie	Texas	1895 (approx.)	Altered	CS2 #56, modified		
Hunt House (402 N. Chestnut St.)	Barnesville	Ohio	1895	Standing	NMD #58B		
Pleasant and Addie Hurt House (401 S. Highland Ave.)	Chanute	Kansas	1895 (approx.)	Standing	MD3 #37		
Noah H. Hutton House	Richmond	Indiana	1895 (approx.)		CS2 #36, modified		
Ivandale (Dr. Charles M. Sebastian House) (115 N. McCombs St.)	Martin	Tennessee	1895	Standing	NRHP (#82004067)		
John C. Jamison House	Cadiz	Ohio	1895 (approx.)		CS2 #36; HI pp. 48–49		
George M. Jones House (3128 Rivermont Ave.)	Lynchburg	Virginia	1895 (approx.)	Altered	HI pp. 72–73		
Kelly House (1703 20th St.)	Rock Island	Illinois	1895	Standing	CS2 #33		
Dr. James L. Lovvorn House (113 E. College St.)	Bowdon	Georgia	1895 (approx.)	Standing	CS2 #45; NRHP		
Malcolm House (1514 N. Michigan Ave.)	Saginaw	Michigan	1895 (approx.)	Demolished			
Horace Mariotte House	Fort Wayne	Indiana	1895 (approx.)		HI pp. 28–29		
Frank W. Medberry House	Norwich	Connecticut	1895	Standing	American Homes, Feb. 1896		
Miller House (1136 Prospect Ave.)	Ann Arbor	Michigan	1895 (approx.)	Standing			
Monson House (45 Church St.)	Windham	New York	1895 (approx.)	Standing	MD3 #41		
Moran Place (151 S. Cedar St.)	Dresden	Tennessee	1895	Standing			
Neely House (739 E. Washington St.)	Martinsville	Indiana	1895	Standing	CS2 #38; NRHP contributing property (East Martinsville Street Historic District)		
Patterson-Nicholson House (501 Poplar St.)	Honey Grove	Texas	1895	Standing	MD3 #31		
Samuel Powell House	Waterville	Kansas	1895	Standing	CS2 #51		
John Prior House (337 S. Main St.)	Sheffield	Illinois	1895	Standing			
Dr. Roland Lee Rosson House (139 N. 6th St.)	Phoenix	Arizona	1895	Standing	CS2 #1		
Frank Roueche House (352 Euclid Ave.)	Saegertown	Pennsylvania	1895 (approx.)	Standing	CS3 #27; NMD #73		
Rowan House (707 Warren Ave.)	Belvidere	Illinois	1895 (approx.)	Standing	CS3 #27		
Sloan House (240 S. Washington St.)	McLeansboro	Illinois	1895 (approx.)	Standing			
S.E. Smith House	Harrisburg	Pennsylvania	1895 (approx.)		HI pp. 32–33		
Soper House (534 Main St.)	Northport	New York	1895	Standing	MD3 #41		
George B. and Hattie Dale Steele House (514 W. State St.)	Centerville	Iowa	1895	Standing	NMD #65		
T.W. Trout House (705 Poplar)	Honey Grove	Texas	1895	Standing	American Homes, Jul. 1897		
W.R. Walker House	Union	South Carolina	1895 (approx.)		HI pp. 58–59		
William Watson House (132 N. Beach St.)	Ormond	Florida	1895 (approx.)	Altered	HI pp. 50–51		
Charles Zimmerman House (138 Conduit St.)	Annapolis	Maryland	1895 (approx.)	Standing	CS2 #37		
116 Indiana Avenue	Maryville	Tennessee	1896	Standing	NRHP contributing property (Indiana Avenue Historic District)		
206 Lincoln Park Road	Springfield	Kentucky	1896	Standing	NMD #91		
242 W. Center Street	Paxton	Illinois	1896	Standing			
303 N. 7th Street	Cambridge	Ohio	1896	Standing	CS2 #44		
408 S. State Street	North Vernon	Indiana	1896	Standing			
707 N. Fifth Street	Vandalia	Illinois	1896	Standing	CS2 #36		
1701 Pennsylvania Avenue	Des Moines	Iowa	1896	Standing	NMD #56B; MD3 #8-E		
3319 Park 16th Street	Moline	Illinois	1896	Standing	MD3 #44		
14311 Highway 22W	Orrville	Alabama	1896	Standing			
James A. Beck House (401 E. Burlington Ave.)	Fairfield	Iowa	1896	Standing	CS3 #27; NRHP (#78001225)		
Birch House	Macon	Georgia	1896 (approx.)	Demolished	American Homes, Mar. 1896		
Peter Bissman House (462 Park Ave. W)	Mansfield	Ohio	1896	Standing	NRHP		
Blythewood Lawrence S. Holt, Sr., House (Lexington Ave.)	Burlington	North Carolina	1896 (approx.)	Demolished			
Thomas H. Briggs House (W. Edenton St.)	Raleigh	North Carolina	1896	Demolished			
Butcher House (4728 W. Main St.)	Fredonia	New York	1896	Standing	CS2 #39		
John Waddey Carter House (324 E. Church St.)	Martinsville	Virginia	1896	Standing	NRHP (#88002180)		
Central Methodist Church (233 N. Church St.)	Spartanburg	South Carolina	1896	Standing	R; NRHP (#03001002)		
Davis House (560 W. Main St.)	Laurens	South Carolina	1896	Standing			
S.L. Erwin House	Honey Grove	Texas	1896	Demolished	American Homes, Feb. 1897		
James Eugene Fair House (241 E. Scott Ave.)	Knoxville	Tennessee	1896	Standing	NMD #58B; NRHP contributing property (Old North Knoxville Historic District)		
French and Roberts Building (405 W. Depot St.)	Knoxville	Tennessee	1896 (approx.)	Demolished	Housed the offices and drafting rooms of Barber's firm		
William J. Greenman House (27 N. Church St.)	Cortland	New York	1896	Standing	American Homes, Jan. 1895; NRHP (#11000542)		
Daniel Hemmeter House (215 W. Washington St.)	Medina	Ohio	1896	Standing			
Joseph L. Holt House	Burlington	North Carolina	1896 (approx.)	Demolished			
William Kerr House (501 N. Columbia St.)	Union City	Indiana	1896	Standing	NRHP (#87001776)		
John and Henrietta Little House (502 N. Victoria St.)	Victoria	Texas	1896	Demolished	CS2 #33 (modified)		
Mansfield House (1802 Harvard St.)	Houston	Texas	1896	Standing	CS2 #30		
John C. McCoid House (612 E. Monroe St.)	Mount Pleasant	Iowa	1896	Standing	American Homes, Mar. 1896		
John A. McLeod House (802 N. Main St.)	Hattiesburg	Mississippi	1896	Standing	NRHP contributing property (Hub City Historic District)		
Norton House (69 Beech St.)	Rockland	Maine	1896	Standing	NMD #30; CS3 #134		
John Calvin Owings House (787 W. Main St.)	Laurens	South Carolina	1896	Standing	NRHP (#78002520); HABS (SC-606)		
Walter B. Palmer House (1236 Ottawa Ave.)	Ottawa	Illinois	1896 (approx.)	Standing	CS3 #27; AMH #73		
Piatt-Ogden House (24 W. Tioga St.)	Tunkhannock	Pennsylvania	1896	Standing	NMD #56B		
Pillow-Thompson House (718 Perry St.)	Helena	Arkansas	1896	Standing	MD3 #24		
Powell House (450 E. Peace St.)	Canton	Mississippi	1896	Standing			
Francis E. Shaw House (44 Queen St. E)	Elmvale, Springwater	Ontario, Canada	1896	Standing	CS2 #41		
W.P. Sandidge House (298 W. Sixth St.)	Russellville	Kentucky	1896	Standing	CS2 #1		
Spencer-Silver Mansion (200 S. Union Ave.)	Havre de Grace	Maryland	1896	Standing			
Hosea W. Trippet House (209 N. Grand)	Waxahachie	Texas	1896	Standing	NRHP		
George S. White House (508 S. Davis)	Weatherford	Texas	1896	Standing	CS2 #36		
James Robert Williams House (310 E. Main St.)	Carmi	Illinois	1896	Standing	NRHP (#86003716)		
John Woelke House (418 N. West St.)	Anaheim	California	1896	Standing	CS2 #1		
	Macon	Georgia	1897 (approx.)		HI pp. 21–23		
	Elkader	Iowa	1897 (approx.)		MD3 #19-E		
		Maryland	1897 (approx.)		MD3 #17		
Dartmouth	Hanover	New Hampshire	1897 (approx.)		MD3 #22-E		
	Tottenville	New York	1897 (approx.)		MD3 #14-E		
	Wilson	North Carolina	1897 (approx.)		MD3 #5-E		
	Lebanon	Ohio	1897 (approx.)		MD3 #30-E		
	Ladonia	Texas	1897	Standing			
	Seattle	Washington	1897 (approx.)		MD3 #5		
		Wisconsin	1897 (approx.)		MD3 #12		
	Clara	Ontario, Canada	1897 (approx.)		MD3 #33-E		
11 Locust Avenue	Towanda	Pennsylvania	1897 (approx.)	Standing	CS2 #36		
28 Cottage Street	Ware	Massachusetts	1897 (approx.)	Standing	NMD #48B		
30 Cottage Street	Ware	Massachusetts	1897 (approx.)	Standing	NMD #48B		
68 Center Street	Wolfeboro	New Hampshire	1897	Standing	CS2 #1		
158 Spring Street	East Greenwich	Rhode Island	1897 (approx.)	Standing	MD3 #27-E		
429 S. Water Street	Loudonville	Ohio	1897	Standing	CS2 #1		
701 East Main Street	Middletown	Maryland	1897 (approx.)	Standing	MD3 #4-E; NRHP contributing property (Airview Historic District)		
1104 S. Hull Street	Montgomery	Alabama	1897 (approx.)	Standing	American Homes, Jun. 1897, p. 180; NRHP contributing property (Garden District)		
5511 Roland Avenue	Normandy Heights, Baltimore	Maryland	1897 (approx.)	Standing	MD3 #23		
5705 Roland Avenue	Normandy Heights, Baltimore	Maryland	1897 (approx.)	Standing			
5709 Roland Avenue	Normandy Heights, Baltimore	Maryland	1897 (approx.)	Standing	MD2 #20; MD3 #4-E		
24965 21st Road	Arkansas City	Kansas	1897	Standing	CS2 #41		
I.H. Abramson House (460 Edgewood Ave.)	New Haven	Connecticut	1897 (approx.)		American Homes, Jun. 1897		
J.V. Banta House (222 W. McLane St.)	Osceola	Iowa	1897	Standing	NMD #58B; MD #10; NRHP		
Joseph J. Barton House (National Ranching Heritage Center)	Lubbock	Texas	1897 (approx.)	Standing	MD3 #26-E		
Dr. John Thomas Johnson Battle House (The Cedars)	Greensboro	North Carolina	1897 (approx.)	Demolished	MD3 #34		
Dr. Joseph C. and Sallie G. Brown House (218 N. Dillard St.)	Durham	North Carolina	1897 (approx.)	Demolished	MD3 #39; HI pp. 77		
I.W.P. Buchanan House (428 W. Main St.)	Lebanon	Tennessee	1897	Standing	NRHP (#79002487)		
A.Y. Burrows House	Knoxville	Tennessee	1897 (approx.)	Demolished	MD3 #11-E		
Mary Moss Caldwell House	Glasgow	Kentucky	1897 (approx.)		MD3 #27		
E.P. Clafin House	Attleboro	Massachusetts	1897 (approx.)		MD3 #37; HI pp. 34–35		
L.P. DeGroot House	Atlanta	Georgia	1897 (approx.)	Demolished	MD #203; HI pp. 44–45		
Downing House (324 E. Arrow St.)	Marshall	Missouri	1897 (approx.)	Standing	MD3 #18-E		
Dubriel House (5713 Roland Ave.)	Normandy Heights, Baltimore	Maryland	1897 (approx.)	Standing	MD3 #21		
Floyd House (246 Spring St.)	Eureka Springs	Arkansas	1897 (approx.)	Standing	NMD #48B		
Richard P. Gettys House (719 W. Hill Ave.)	Knoxville	Tennessee	1897 (approx.)	Demolished	R; Barber designed the front porch		
John Gillies House (421 Gillies Grove Rd.)	Braeside	Ontario, Canada	1897 (approx.)	Standing	MD3 #6-E; HI pp. 6–7		
Godwin House (5701 Roland Ave.)	Normandy Heights, Baltimore	Maryland	1897 (approx.)	Standing			
Phillip and Phoebe Goodwill House (1 Duhring Street)	Bramwell	West Virginia	1897	Standing			
Lilly Grandy House (504 W. Main St.)	Elizabeth City	North Carolina	1897	Standing	NRHP contributing property (Elizabeth City Historic District)		
A.E. Griffith House	Auburn	Kentucky	1897 (approx.)		MD3 #26-E; HI pp. 12–13		
Hamill House (5607 Roland Ave.)	Normandy Heights, Baltimore	Maryland	1897 (approx.)	Standing	MD3 #24		
Hollywood Cemetery Superintendent's House (400 S. Cherry St.)	Richmond	Virginia	1897 (approx.)	Standing	NMD #57B		
Charles T. Holt House (228 Holt St.)	Haw River	North Carolina	1897	Standing	MD3 #40; HI pp. 10–11; NRHP (#82003421)		
Ashley Horne House (Main St.)	Clayton	North Carolina	1897	Demolished			
Mrs. S.M. Howard House (404 E. Gregg St.)	Calvert	Texas	1897	Standing			
Church Howe House (919 16th St.)	Auburn	Nebraska	1897 (approx.)	Altered	MD3 #3-E		
C. R. Joy House (816 Grand Ave.)	Keokuk	Iowa	1897	Standing	MD3 #29; NRHP (#96001587)		
J. Nelson Kelly House (521 S. 5th St.)	Grand Forks	North Dakota	1897	Standing	NRHP (#94000058)		
William Leary House (203 E. Water St.)	Edenton	North Carolina	1897	Standing	R; CS2 #1; NRHP contributing property (Edenton Historic District)		
C.E. Marr House	New Hampton	Iowa	1897 (approx.)		MD3 #36		
Eva Means House (516 S. Church St.)	Princeton	Illinois	1897 (approx.)	Standing	MD3 #25-E; HI pp. 46–47		
Robert I. Morse House (1014 N. Garden St.)	Lakeway, Bellingham	Washington	1897	Standing	CS2 #33		
L.N. Moss House	Decorah	Iowa	1897 (approx.)	Standing	MD3 #7-E		
E.E. Mummert House (209 S. 6th St.)	Goshen	Indiana	1897 (approx.)	Standing	R		
E. Frederick Mynatt House (3300 N. Broadway)	Knoxville	Tennessee	1897 (approx.)	Demolished	HI pp. 8–9		
W.G. Newman House	Somerset	Virginia	1897 (approx.)		MD3 #30		
C.A. Nickerson House (1711 E. Glenwood Ave.)	Knoxville	Tennessee	1897 (approx.)	Burned	MD3 #28		
Normandy Heights	Baltimore	Maryland	1897 (approx.)		MD3 #22		
Olendarf House (403 N. Cherry St.)	Mount Carmel	Illinois	1897	Standing	NMD #56B		
L.H. Parish House (604 E. Gregg St.)	Calvert	Texas	1897	Standing	CS3 #27; NRHP contributing property (Calvert Historic District)		
Dr. W.M. Reedy House	Clio	South Carolina	1897				
Alfred F. Remy House (183 W. Second St.)	Mansfield	Ohio	1897	Standing			
Kate Shepard House (1552 Monterey Place)	Mobile	Alabama	1897	Standing	MD #10; NRHP (#84000680)		
Alexander Martin Smith House (131 Gwyn Ave.)	Elkin	North Carolina	1897	Standing	NRHP contributing property (Gwyn Avenue-Bridge Street Historic District)		
Raphael Soquet House (345 S. Monroe Ave.)	Green Bay	Wisconsin	1897	Standing	CS2 #33		
William E. Tate House (808 S. Lamar St.)	Weatherford	Texas	1897	Standing			
L. Terwilliger House	Ridgewood	New Jersey	1897 (approx.)		MD3 #18; HI pp. 64–65		
Vile House	San Felipe	California	1897 (approx.)		American Homes, Jun. 1897		
J. Wallace House	Eldora	Iowa	1897 (approx.)		HI pp. 18–20; MD3 #3-E		
Walter-Heins House (605 N. Barstow St.)	Eau Claire	Wisconsin	1897	Standing			
W.J. Way House (456 Broadway St.)	Carson	Iowa	1897	Standing	CS2 #36		
J.W. Willis House	Greeneville	Tennessee	1897 (approx.)	Demolished	HI pp. 24–25		
Woodard House (508 Fairfax Ave.)	Norfolk	Virginia	1897 (approx.)	Standing	MD3 p. 180		
	Hopkinsville	Kentucky	1898		MD3 #3-E		
137 Main Street	Chester	Vermont	1898	Standing			
1020 Guilford Street	Huntington	Indiana	1898	Standing	NMD #65		
3904 Floral Avenue	Norwood	Ohio	1898 (approx.)	Partially destroyed by fire	CS3 #27		
Anderson House (227 Oakland Ave.)	Rock Hill	South Carolina	1898	Standing	NRHP (#82003908)		
Adolph Boesel House	New Bremen	Ohio	1898		NRHP (#79001784), de-listed after being moved; same design as Purpus House at 114 S. Franklin St.		
Donalson-Rollins House (525 E. Shotwell St.)	Bainbridge	Georgia	1898	Standing	MD3 #15		
Ehrlich-Immendorf House (632 E. Shotwell St.)	Bainbridge	Georgia	1898	Standing	NRHP contributing property (Bainbridge Residential Historic District)		
David Gaskill House (402 S. Ellis St.)	Salisbury	North Carolina	1898	Standing	NRHP contributing property (Salisbury Historic District)		
Joseph M. Green House (301 N. Jefferson St.)	Mount Pleasant	Iowa	1898	Standing	MD3 #37		
Webb Hultz House (S. Main St.)	Chariton	Iowa	1898	Demolished	ART? #58		
Jester-Butler-Clyde House (630 S. Fannin Ave.)	Tyler	Texas	1898	Standing	MD #240; MD3 #1-E; NRHP contributing property (Charnwood Residential Historic District)		
The Keyhole House	Lebanon	Kentucky	1898	Standing	CS2 #44		
Benjamin F. Lane House (601 W. Nash)	Wilson	North Carolina	1898	Standing	MD #205; MD3 #9		
Manning House (1517 Asylum Ave.)	Knoxville	Tennessee	1898 (approx.)	Demolished	CS2 #41		
Gaston Meares House (110 S. College St.)	Monroe	North Carolina	1898	Standing			
John Milroy House	Houston	Texas	1898 (approx.)	Standing	CS2 #30		
Thomas Murphy House	Salisbury	North Carolina	1898	Demolished			
C. L. Post House (238 Capital Ave. NE)	Battle Creek	Michigan	1898	Standing	NRHP contributing property (Maple Street Historic District)		
Fridolin and Alma Purpus House (114 S. Franklin St.)	New Bremen	Ohio	1898	Standing	Same design as Adolph Boesel House		
Williams-Woodard-Banks House (501 Broad St.)	Wilson	North Carolina	1898	Standing	NRHP contributing property (Broad-Kenan Streets Historic District)		
John Wise House (504 Byers Ave.)	Joplin	Missouri	1898	Standing			
30 Hawley Terrace	Yonkers	New York	1899 (approx.)	Standing			
414 W. Beard Avenue	Syracuse	New York	1899 (approx.)	Standing	MD2 #60		
418 W. Beard Avenue	Syracuse	New York	1899 (approx.)	Standing	MD2 #60		
506 Calhoun Street	Morris	Illinois	1899	Standing	American Homes, Jul. 1899		
1304 Main Street	Crete	Illinois	1899	Standing	MD3 #37		
2331 Washington Avenue	Knoxville	Tennessee	1899	Standing	CS2 #38		
W.H. Baker House (1 S. Washington St.)	Winchester	Virginia	1899	Standing	MD3 #30		
Alfred S. Bennett House (608 W. 6th St.)	The Dalles	Oregon	1899	Standing			
Curry Mansion (511 Caroline St.)	Key West	Florida	1899	Standing	MD3 #45		
Earl-Rochelle House (1920 Magnolia St.)	Texarkana	Texas	1899	Standing	NRHP (#99000720)		
Dr. Frank Finney House (608 Belleview Ave.)	La Junta	Colorado	1899	Standing	MD3 #20		
Newton E. Graham House (102 4th St.)	East Brady	Pennsylvania	1899 (approx.)	Standing	Now First Presbyterian Church and East Brady Library		
Johnston House (210 Savannah Rd.)	Lewes	Delaware	1899	Standing			
J.T. Jones House (601 Ferry St.)	Decatur	Alabama	1899	Standing	MD3 #4-E; NRHP contributing property (Bank Street-Old Decatur Historic District)		
K.D. Lawrence House (Noble St.)	Lovelady	Texas	1899	Standing	MD3 #44		
Reeves-Womack House (405 W. Fox St.)	Caldwell	Texas	1899 (approx.)	Standing	NMD #58B		
Dr. Francis B. Warnock House (201 Maple St.)	Battle Creek	Iowa	1899	Standing	NRHP (#88001945)		
Watkins House (302 S. Camden St.)	Richmond	Missouri	1899	Standing	CS2 #36; NRHP (#83001036)		
Osella and Leva Wright House (235 Pearson Dr.)	Asheville	North Carolina	1899	Standing	MD3 #4-E		
	Strasburg	Illinois	1890s	Standing	CS2 #2		
	Wenona	Illinois	1890s	Standing	CS2 #56		
	Elizabeth City	North Carolina	1890s	Demolished			
	Bonham	Texas	1890s	Standing	MD3 #44		
	Sterrett	Texas	1890s	Altered	CS2 #56		
3 Duffryn Avenue	Malvern	Pennsylvania	1890s (approx.)	Standing	CS2 #44		
12 Franklin Street	Delhi	New York	1890s	Standing			
12 N. Spring Street	Aviston	Illinois	1890s	Standing			
27 Main Street	Delhi	New York	1890s	Standing			
30 Elm Street	Potsdam	New York	1890s	Standing			
48 S. Wade Avenue	Washington	Pennsylvania	1890s	Standing	CS2 #1		
69 Prospect Street	Gardner	Massachusetts	1890s	Standing	CS2 #36		
84 N. Main Street	Spencer	New York	1890s	Standing	CS2 #33/36		
101 Iowa Avenue	Holton	Kansas	1890s	Standing			
105 S. Oak Street	Buckley	Illinois	1890s	Standing			
105 E. Rudolph Street	Crossville	Illinois	1890s	Standing			
109 W. Twelfth Street	Holland	Michigan	1890s	Standing			
112 Springer Avenue	Edwardsville	Illinois	1890s	Standing	CS2 #38	Same House, Different Century	
123 Central Street	Salinas	California	1890s	Demolished	CS3 #27		
128 S. Washington Street	Du Quoin	Illinois	1890s	Standing			
131 W. Hanover Street	Marshall	Michigan	1890s	Standing			
140 N. Freedom Street	Ravenna	Ohio	1890s	Standing	CS3 #128		
148 Walden Street	Concord	Massachusetts	1890s	Standing			
149 Atlantic Street	Bridgeton	New Jersey	1890s	Standing	MD3 #41		
204 First Street	Austin	Minnesota	1890s	Standing			
204 E. High Street	Mount Vernon	Ohio	1890s	Standing			
219 W. Third Street	Trenton	Illinois	1890s	Standing			
221 W. Crawford Street	Dalton	Georgia	1890s	Standing	CS2 #53		
239 W. Columbus Street	Martinsville	Indiana	1890s	Standing			
300 E. Union Street	Vienna	Georgia	1890s	Standing			
302 W. Green Street	Hastings	Michigan	1890s	Standing			
305 E. Hardaway Avenue	Union Springs	Alabama	1890s	Standing			
306 Clark Street	Charles City	Iowa	1890s	Standing			
308 W. Pulteney Street	Corning	New York	1890s	Standing	MD3 #37		
318 N. Thornton Avenue	Dalton	Georgia	1890s	Standing	MD3 #44		
319 Park Avenue	Paterson	New Jersey	1890s	Standing	CS2 #60		
322 E. Fifth Street	Warsaw	Ohio	1890s	Standing			
345 Pearl Street	Jackson	Ohio	1890s	Standing	CS2 #38		
346 Linden Place	DeKalb	Illinois	1890s	Standing			
360 E. Central Avenue	Zeeland	Michigan	1890s	Standing			
369 Montford Avenue	Asheville	North Carolina	1890s	Standing			
404 E. Chestnut Street	Mount Vernon	Ohio	1890s	Standing			
404 N. State Street	Greenfield	Indiana	1890s	Standing			
411 E. Maiden Street	Washington	Pennsylvania	1890s	Standing	CS2 #1		
436 S. Pierce Street	Delphos	Ohio	1890s	Standing			
439 E. Second Street	Dover	Ohio	1890s	Standing			
500 E. Madison Street	Gibsonburg	Ohio	1890s	Standing			
529 S. Main Street	Washington	Pennsylvania	1890s	Standing	CS2 #33		
532 S. Maple Street	Carrollton	Illinois	1890s	Standing			
575 Madison Avenue	Grand Rapids	Michigan	1890s	Standing	CS3 #27		
605 Madison Avenue	Grand Rapids	Michigan	1890s	Standing	CS2 #44		
612 E. Hoosier Street	North Vernon	Indiana	1890s	Standing	CS2 #14		
614 Wayne Street	Sandusky	Ohio	1890s	Standing			
705 W. Main Street	Clarksville	Arkansas	1890s	Standing	CS2 #41		
705 Filmore Street	Sidney	Iowa	1890s	Standing	CS3 #128		
707 N. Capitol Avenue	Corydon	Indiana	1890s	Standing			
726 Seventh Street	Columbus	Indiana	1890s	Standing			
801 E. High Street	Mount Vernon	Ohio	1890s	Standing			
814 State Street	Saint Joseph	Michigan	1890s	Standing			
816 Grove Street	Alton	Illinois	1890s	Standing	xxx #54		
816 N. Rankin Street	Natchez	Mississippi	1890s	Standing	MD3 #36-E		
817 Eleanor Street	Knoxville	Tennessee	1890s	Standing	CS2 #38		
903 Lake Boulevard	Saint Joseph	Michigan	1890s	Standing	CS2 #41		
1006 Luttrell Street	Knoxville	Tennessee	1890s	Standing	CS2 #38		
1026 Chestnut Street	Columbus	Indiana	1890s	Standing			
1034 Washington Street	Columbus	Indiana	1890s	Standing	CS2 #44		
1117 Lake Boulevard	Saint Joseph	Michigan	1890s	Standing	MD3 #41		
1501 Washington Street	Eldora	Iowa	1890s	Standing	CS2 #51		
1611 Washington Street	Eldora	Iowa	1890s	Standing	CS2 #62		
4703 St. Elmo Avenue	Chattanooga	Tennessee	1890s	Standing	CS2 #2		
5865 Highway 215	Glenn Springs	South Carolina	1890s	Standing			
W. Church Street	Elizabeth City	North Carolina	1890s	Standing			
Newton Ave. at Mill St.	Binghamton	New York	1890s	Standing	MD3 #23-E		
St. Elmo Avenue	Chattanooga	Tennessee	1890s	Standing	CS2 #2		
Wilson Avenue	Eutaw	Alabama	1890s	Standing	CS2 #15		
H.M. Abbett House (1746 Virginia Ave.)	College Park	Georgia	1890s	Standing	CS2 #56		
Armstrong House (1008 N. Washington St.)	Nevada	Missouri	1890s	Standing	CS2 #45		
Bell House (303 W. Cherry Ave.)	Jonesboro	Arkansas	1890s	Standing	CS2 #33		
B.H. Bissman House (458 Park Ave. W)	Mansfield	Ohio	1890s	Standing	NRHP		
Maj. William Black House (311 W. Ash St.)	Brinkley	Arkansas	1890s	Standing	CS2 #1		
Bloor House (155 Branch St.)	Hartford	Wisconsin	1890s	Standing	MD3 #37		
Bonny Oaks	Burlington	North Carolina	1890s	Demolished			
Breathitt House (1720 S. Virginia St.)	Hopkinsville	Kentucky	1890s	Standing	R		
Bullard House (188 Circle Dr.)	DeFuniak Springs	Florida	1890s	Standing	CS2 #1		
Chamberlain House (211 Michigan Ave.)	Mobile	Alabama	1890s	Standing	CS2 #36; NRHP contributing property (Leinkauf Historic District)		
George P. Chapman House	Sullivan	Illinois	1890s	Altered	CS2 #37		
Coleman House (437 E. Shotwell St.)	Bainbridge	Georgia	1890s	Standing			
Hervey N. Crane House (401 E. Washington St.)	Mount Pleasant	Iowa	1890s	Standing	CS2 #36		
Col. Alexander Davis House (119 Davis St.)	Independence	Virginia	1890s	Standing	R		
Dornoff House (151 S. Main St.)	Marine City	Michigan	1890s	Standing	CS2 #36		
Dukes House (30 Cumberland Ave.)	Asheville	North Carolina	1890s	Standing	MD3 #37		
Earle House (304 Crescent St.)	Edgerton	Wisconsin	1890s	Standing			
Isaak B. English House	Macon	Georgia	1890s	Demolished	NMD #83B		
M.R. Ford House (39 Bracewell Ave.)	North Adams	Massachusetts	1890s	Standing	CS2 #41		
J.M. Harman House (414 E. Main St.)	Floyd	Virginia	1890s	Standing			
Harvey House (201 W. Maple Ave.)	Fayetteville	West Virginia	1890s	Standing			
Inman House (202 E. Liberty St.)	York	South Carolina	1890s	Standing			
Kangerga House (501 N. High St.)	Henderson	Texas	1890s	Standing			
Kidd House (252 Benson St.)	Hartwell	Georgia	1890s	Standing	CS2 #37 (modified)		
Alva Kitselman House	Muncie	Indiana	1890s	Standing	CS2 #53 (modified)		
John Kuhn House (231 Fourth St.)	Warsaw	Ohio	1890s	Standing			
Leflang House (1007 N. Washington Ave.)	Lexington	Nebraska	1890s	Standing			
Lockhart House (219 Leelanau Ave.)	Frankfort	Michigan	1890s	Standing	CS3 #128		
Lockyer House (815 Langdon St.)	Alton	Illinois	1890s	Standing	xxx #134		
Longfellow House (401 High St.)	Macksburg	Ohio	1890s	Standing			
Lord House (512 Ridgeway St.)	Edgerton	Wisconsin	1890s	Standing	MD3 #44		
Lowe House (306 F St.)	Cheney	Washington	1890s	Standing			
May House (113 W. Robert Toombs Ave.)	Washington	Georgia	1890s	Standing	R		
Lewellyn C. Marshall House (540 SW 6th Ave.)	Albany	Oregon	1890s	Standing			
John B. Malot House (1827 H St.)	Bedford	Indiana	1890s	Standing	CS2 #20		
Martin House (15 Hwy 110)	South Royalton	Vermont	1890s	Standing			
A.G. McCurry House (159 Benson St.)	Hartwell	Georgia	1890s	Standing	CS2 #37 (modified)		
McDougle House (1312 S. Elm St.)	Georgetown	Texas	1890s	Standing			
Merriam House (549 W. Prairie St.)	Columbus	Wisconsin	1890s	Standing			
George Moore House (2 James St.)	Parry Sound	Ontario, Canada	1890s	Standing	CS2 #12		
Osborne House (43 State Route 296)	Windham	New York	1890s	Standing			
J. Ottinger House	Wilson	North Carolina	1890s	Demolished			
Penn House (1304 S. Elm St.)	Georgetown	Texas	1890s	Standing			
Peter C. Penn House (322 W. Main St.)	Danville	Virginia	1890s	Standing			
Pollard House (1303 State St.)	Bowling Green	Kentucky	1890s	Standing	CS2 #23		
Prioleau House (302 Sumter Ave.)	Summerville	South Carolina	1890s	Standing			
Rawl-Couch House (520 Short St.)	Batesburg	South Carolina	1890s	Standing	R; CS2 #1		
Reynolds House (53 Wilson Ave.)	Uniontown	Pennsylvania	1890s	Standing			
Robertson House (73320 S. Fulton St.)	Armada	Michigan	1890s	Standing	MD3 #41		
George Webster Scobie House	Titusville	Florida	1890s	Demolished	CS2 #38		
William E. Seibert House (428 N. Broadway St.)	New Philadelphia	Ohio	1890s	Standing			
Sharp House (990 Normal Ave.)	Chico	California	1890s	Standing	MD3 #37		
Snyder House (307 Railroad St.)	Dawson	Pennsylvania	1890s	Standing			
Adam Strome House (225 Beaver St.)	Warsaw	Ohio	1890s	Standing	CS2 #40		
Sullivan House (16214 Laconner Whitney Rd.)	La Conner	Washington	1890s	Standing			
Taylor House (157 S. Main St.)	Marine City	Michigan	1890s	Standing	CS2 #33		
W.H. Thompson House	Georgetown	Texas	1890s				
Van Siclen House (150 Ocean Ave.)	Northport	New York	1890s	Standing	MD3 #41		
Vought House (44 S. Main St.)	Pittsford	New York	1890s	Standing			
Russell J. Waters Carriage House (2625 Portland St.)	Los Angeles	California	1890s	Standing			
Weir House (218 Surrey Ave.)	Elkin	North Carolina	1890s	Standing			
White House (745 Main St.)	Caribou	Maine	1890s	Standing	CS3 #128		
John Wilkins House (254 N. Sycamore St.)	Campbellsburg	Indiana	1890s	Standing			
John T.C. Wilkins House (140 S. Sycamore St.)	Campbellsburg	Indiana	1890s	Standing			
Thomas Wilkins House (298 N. Sycamore St.)	Campbellsburg	Indiana	1890s	Standing			
Wisner House (1603 Washington St.)	Eldora	Iowa	1890s	Standing			
	Birmingham	Alabama	1900 (approx.)		MD #191		
	Elwood	Indiana	1900 (approx.)	Standing			
Colonial Place-Riverview Neighborhood	Norfolk	Virginia	1900 (approx.)	Standing	MD3 #23-E		
Ridge Road	Oakfield	Maine	1900 (approx.)	Standing	MD3 #37		
15 W. Court Street	New Hampton	Iowa	1900 (approx.)	Standing	NMD #55B		
18 Newton Avenue	Binghamton	New York	1900 (approx.)	Standing			
19 Elliot Hill Road	North Grosvenordale	Connecticut	1900	Standing	MD3 #41		
20 Newton Avenue	Binghamton	New York	1900 (approx.)	Standing			
22 S. Franklin Street	Athens	New York	1900 (approx.)	Standing	MD3 #2		
22 Newton Avenue	Binghamton	New York	1900 (approx.)	Standing			
30 Odell Avenue	Yonkers	New York	1900 (approx.)	Standing			
32 Sixth Street	Le Mars	Iowa	1900 (approx.)	Standing	MD3 #4-E		
32 W. Walnut Street	North Vernon	Indiana	1900 (approx.)	Standing			
39 Third Street	Savanna	Illinois	1900	Standing	MD3 #41		
52 Fourth Avenue NW	Watertown	South Dakota	1900 (approx.)	Standing			
75 Depot Street	Fleischmanns	New York	1900 (approx.)	Standing	MD3 #38		
78 Gibson Street	Canandaigua	New York	1900 (approx.)	Standing			
80 Clifton Avenue	Kingston	New York	1900 (approx.)	Standing			
84 Gibson Street	Canandaigua	New York	1900 (approx.)	Standing	CS3 #128		
91 Wagner Avenue	Fleischmanns	New York	1900 (approx.)	Standing	MD3 #37		
97 Maple Avenue	Catskill	New York	1900 (approx.)	Standing	CS2 #39		
100 E. Roadway Avenue	Effingham	Illinois	1900 (approx.)	Standing	MD3 #44		
100 Seventh Street	Oregon	Illinois	1900 (approx.)	Standing	MD3# #37		
111 Grace Street	Sharon	Wisconsin	1900	Standing	MD3 #6		
111 N. Greene Street	Snow Hill	North Carolina	1900 (approx.)	Standing	MD #205; MD3 #9		
112 N. Third Avenue	Villisca	Iowa	1900 (approx.)	Standing	MD3 #4		
113 N. Chestnut Street	Augusta	Michigan	1900 (approx.)	Standing	MD #205; MD3 #9		
117 N. Sixth Street	Vincennes	Indiana	1900 (approx.)	Standing	MD3 #23-E		
128 W. Main Street	Leipsic	Ohio	1900 (approx.)	Standing	MD3 #37		
131 W. Market Street	Hertford	North Carolina	1900 (approx.)	Standing	MD3 #22		
170 Beck Avenue	Akron	Ohio	1900 (approx.)	Standing	MD3 #36		
170 College Street	Savannah	Tennessee	1900 (approx.)	Standing	CS2 #41		
203 E. Second Street	Broussard	Louisiana	1900 (approx.)	Standing			
252 Maple Avenue	Timberville	Virginia	1900 (approx.)	Standing	MD3 #22		
265 Williams Street	New London	Connecticut	1900 (approx.)	Standing	MD3 #38		
294 E. Division Street	Fond du Lac	Wisconsin	1900 (approx.)	Standing	CS2 #36		
301 S. Seventh Street	Escanaba	Michigan	1900	Standing	MD3 #9		
303 W. High Street	Anna	Illinois	1900 (approx.)	Standing			
321 W. Cherokee Avenue	Cartersville	Georgia	1900 (approx.)	Standing			
389 Lowell Street	Reading	Massachusetts	1900 (approx.)	Standing			
400 E. Spruce Street	Marcus	Iowa	1900 (approx.)	Standing	MD3 #4-E		
401 N. Saint Mary Street	Carthage	Texas	1900 (approx.)	Standing	MD3 #44, modified		
402 N. College Street	Greenville	Alabama	1900	Standing	MD3 #4; NRHP contributing property (Fort Dale-College Street Historic District)		
405 S. Locust Street	Pana	Illinois	1900 (approx.)	Standing			
422 N. Fourth Street	Vincennes	Indiana	1900 (approx.)	Standing	MD3 #1		
442 N. Peachtree Street	Norcross	Georgia	1900 (approx.)	Standing	MD #213; MD3 #14		
455 E. Main Street	Buford	Georgia	1900 (approx.)	Standing	MD3 #44		
503 Chestnut Street	Marshall	Illinois	1900 (approx.)	Standing	MD3 #1		
506 W. Market Street	Honey Grove	Texas	1900 (approx.)	Standing			
507 W. Wells Avenue	Knoxville	Tennessee	1900 (approx.)	Demolished	CS2 #38		
606 Rees Park	Americus	Georgia	1900 (approx.)	Standing			
608 Ingalls Avenue	Petosky	Michigan	1900 (approx.)	Standing	NMD #65		
632 S. Maple Street	Carrollton	Illinois	1900 (approx.)	Standing			
641 W. Main Street	Elkin	North Carolina	1900 (approx.)	Standing			
654 King Street	Port Chester	New York	1900 (approx.)	Standing			
669 Fifth Street	Florala	Alabama	1900	Standing			
733 S. Main Street	Carrollton	Illinois	1900 (approx.)	Standing			
753 N. Capitol Avenue	Corydon	Indiana	1900	Standing	CS2 #36		
813 Main Street	Henry	Illinois	1900 (approx.)	Standing	MD3 #44		
833 N. Franklin Street	Manchester	Iowa	1900 (approx.)	Standing	CS2 #14		
835 N. Fountain Street	Springfield	Ohio	1900 (approx.)	Standing	MD3 #37		
907 Luttrell Street	Knoxville	Tennessee	1900	Standing	ART #557		
1104 Government Street	Mobile	Alabama	1900 (approx.)	Standing	NRHP contributing property (Oakleigh Garden Historic District)		
1182 Big Bend Road	Strawberry Plains	Tennessee	1900 (approx.)	Standing	MD3 #26-E		
1262 S. Fountain Street	Springfield	Ohio	1900 (approx.)	Standing			
1355 Armstrong Avenue	Knoxville	Tennessee	1900 (approx.)	Standing			
1433 Coker Avenue	Knoxville	Tennessee	1900 (approx.)	Standing	MD #266		
1614 Washington Avenue	Knoxville	Tennessee	1900 (approx.)	Standing	ART #600		
2209 Delmar Avenue	Granite City	Illinois	1900	Standing	MD3 #6		
2422 Elm Street	Manchester	New Hampshire	1900 (approx.)	Standing	MD3 #18		
2701 E. Fifth Avenue	Knoxville	Tennessee	1900 (approx.)	Standing	NRHP contributing property (Park City Historic District)		
3445 Home Avenue	Berwyn	Illinois	1900 (approx.)	Standing			
4114 St. Elmo Avenue	Chattanooga	Tennessee	1900 (approx.)	Standing	MD3 #23-E		
5008 State Route 52	Jeffersonville	New York	1900	Standing	MD3 #29-E		
Kate Alexander House (550 E. Main St.)	Murfreesboro	Tennessee	1900 (approx.)	Burned	MD3 #36-E		
George W.S. Allen House (207 E. Henry St.)	Mount Pleasant	Iowa	1900	Standing	NRHP (#85000721)		
S.W. Andrews House (444 W. Prairie St.)	Columbus	Wisconsin	1900 (approx.)	Standing			
Bennett House (301 Red Bluff St.)	Clio	South Carolina	1900 (approx.)	Standing			
Simon Benson House (1803 SW Park Ave.)	Portland	Oregon	1900	Standing	MD3 #37		
Billeaud House (302 E. Main St.)	Broussard	Louisiana	1900 (approx.)	Standing			
F. Ed Carroll House (1684 Park)	Beaumont	Texas	1900 (approx.)	Demolished	MD2 #27		
Dr. A.L. Charles House (104 S. Broadway St.)	Lancaster	Kansas	1900	Standing			
A.H. Clambey House (Whitford St.)	Fergus Falls	Minnesota	1900 (approx.)	Moved, altered			
Comeaux House (101 E. 2nd St.)	Broussard	Louisiana	1900 (approx.)	Standing			
Comeaux House (208 E. Main St.)	Broussard	Louisiana	1900 (approx.)	Standing			
W.M. Conner House (106 Short Bay St.)	Hattiesburg	Mississippi	1900 (approx.)	Standing			
Cranston House (610 First St.)	Woodland	California	1900 (approx.)	Standing	CS3 #134; MD3 #36-E		
Dantzler House (3206 Dantzler St.)	Moss Point	Mississippi	1900	Standing	NMD #58B		
Deal-Weaver House (426 S. Main St.)	Emporia	Virginia	1900 (approx.)	Standing			
John C. Dice House (413 E. Washington St.)	Lewisburg	West Virginia	1900	Standing	MD# 213; MD3 #14; NRHP		
Dunn House (102 Short Bay St.)	Hattiesburg	Mississippi	1900 (approx.)	Standing			
Eichert House (527 N. Barstow St.)	Eau Claire	Wisconsin	1900 (approx.)	Standing			
Elliott House (347 Prospect St.)	Willimantic	Connecticut	1900 (approx.)	Standing			
Farnsworth House (1302 Chestnut St.)	Bowling Green	Kentucky	1900 (approx.)	Standing			
Ferguson House (144 N. Main St.)	Canandaigua	New York	1900 (approx.)	Standing			
William Dixon Fowler House (5885 Highway 215)	Glenn Springs	South Carolina	1900 (approx.)	Standing	MD3 #36-E		
Gaither House (11 S. Highland Ave.)	Aurora	Illinois	1900 (approx.)	Standing			
William Gedamke House (1304 E. Powell Blvd.)	Gresham	Oregon	1900 (approx.)	Standing	NRHP (#89001970)		
John N. Gilbert House		Texas	1900 (approx.)				
D.Y. Greib House (90 N. Crest Road, Missionary Ridge)	Chattanooga	Tennessee	1900	Standing	MD2 #20; MD3 #4-E; HI pp. 36–38		
Will B. Goodenough House (3441 Home St.)	Berwyn	Illinois	1900 (approx.)	Standing			
Andrew M. Hargis House (1109 W. 2nd St.)	Grand Island	Nebraska	1900 (approx.)	Standing	NRHP		
Haynes House (537 E. Main St.)	Murfreesboro	Tennessee	1900 (approx.)	Standing			
Henry Hildebrandt Mansion (823 N. Washington St.)	Nevada	Missouri	1900	Standing	MD3 #24		
Holmes House (7 High Street)	Livermore Falls	Maine	1900 (approx.)	Standing	CS2 #14		
Hook House (904 N. George St.)	Rome	New York	1900 (approx.)	Standing			
Horsey House (603 Centre St.)	Fernandina Beach	Florida	1900 (approx.)	Standing			
Jackson House (70 Pleasant St.)	Gardiner	Maine	1900 (approx.)	Standing			
Keller House (204 S. Powell St.)	Union Springs	Alabama	1900 (approx.)	Standing			
Laubenstein House (203 Church St.)	Hartford	Wisconsin	1900 (approx.)	Standing			
Leake House (547 Second St.)	Woodland	California	1900 (approx.)	Standing			
John Leisy House (1102 Concert St.)	Keokuk	Iowa	1900 (approx.)	Standing			
R.C. Lubiens House (513 W. Fourth St.)	Saint Ansgar	Iowa	1900 (approx.)	Standing			
Marshall-Yohe House (316 S. Second St.)	Lincoln	Kansas	1900 (approx.)	Standing	MD3 #37; NRHP		
Meyer House (81 Main St.)	Tiffin	Ohio	1900 (approx.)	Standing			
Charles L. Moore House (Magnolia Hill) (608 Perry St.)	Helena	Arkansas	1900 (approx.)	Standing			
Mount Athos	Barboursville	Virginia	1900 (approx.)	Burned	Built at a cost of $40,000, this was one of the most expensive houses built using a Barber design		
John B. Nalty House (328 S. Jackson St.)	Brookhaven	Mississippi	1900 (approx.)	Standing			
Osking House (405 Eielson St.)	Hatton	North Dakota	1900 (approx.)	Standing			
Palmer House (25 Church St.)	Noank	Connecticut	1900 (approx.)	Standing			
J.E. Paullin House	Fort Gaines	Georgia	1900	Standing			
George Perkins Carriage House (803 W. Main St.)	Sac City	Iowa	1900 (approx.)	Standing			
Pine Crest (131 E. Scott Ave.)	Knoxville	Tennessee	1900	Standing	MD #213; MD3 #14; NRHP contributing property (Old North Knoxville Historic District)		
Presby House (127 W. Broadway St.)	Goldendale	Washington	1900 (approx.)	Standing	MD3 #43		
R.J. Reynolds House (666 W. 5th St.)	Winston-Salem	North Carolina	1900	Demolished			
W.N. Reynolds House	Winston-Salem	North Carolina	1900 (approx.)	Demolished			
Roderick House (921 Center St.)	Hannibal	Missouri	1900 (approx.)	Standing			
Schmitt-Powell House (726 5th Ave. SW)	Albany	Oregon	1900 (approx.)	Standing	MD #205; MD3 #9		
John Spire House (500 S. Main St.)	Anna	Illinois	1900 (approx.)	Standing	MD2 #20; MD3 #4-E		
Sproles House (307 Natchez Ave.)	Brookhaven	Mississippi	1900 (approx.)	Standing	xxx #745		
Steward House (200 Thornton St.)	Union Point	Georgia	1900 (approx.)	Standing			
Clem Tomlinson House	Tate Springs	Tennessee	1900	Standing (altered)	MD3 #44		
Charles Topp House (152 S. Birdsey St.)	Columbus	Wisconsin	1900 (approx.)	Standing			
Turner House (98 Windham St.)	Willimantic	Connecticut	1900 (approx.)	Standing			
Walter House (605 N. Barstow St.)	Eau Claire	Wisconsin	1900 (approx.)	Standing			
West House (229 Beech St.)	Helena	Arkansas	1900	Standing			
Yeomans House (318 Jonathan Trumbull Hwy.)	Columbia	Connecticut	1900 (approx.)	Standing	MD3 #37		
200 E. Third Street	Metropolis	Illinois	1901	Standing	CS2 #56		
213 E. Main Street	Ladoga	Indiana	1901	Standing	MD3 #15		
244 E. Main Street	Clarksburg	West Virginia	1901 (approx.)	Standing	MD3 #15		
537 Fifth Avenue	New Kensington	Pennsylvania	1901	Standing	MD3 #24-E		
723 Arkansas Street	Helena	Arkansas	1901	Standing	MD2 #51		
Bartlett Hall (Maryville College)	Maryville	Tennessee	1901	Standing	NRHP contributing property (Maryville College Historic District)		
W.A. Blair House	Winston-Salem	North Carolina	1901	Demolished			
Burfoot-Toxey House (104 W. Main St.)	Elizabeth City	North Carolina	1901	Standing	MD #213; MD3 #14		
William Gebhard House (419 W. Main St.)	Morris	Illinois	1901	Standing	MD3 #4-E (modified)		
Gibson-Henson House (302 Lafayette St.)	Decatur	Alabama	1901	Standing	MD3 #36-E; NRHP contributing property (Bank Street-Old Decatur Historic District)		
P.D. Gwaltney, Jr., House (304 S. Church St.)	Smithfield	Virginia	1901	Standing	MD3 #29		
Frank Huffsmith House (207 S. Magnolia St.)	Palestine	Texas	1901	Altered	MD3 #24		
Lambertson House (611 Coggin Ave.)	Brownwood	Texas	1901	Standing	MD3 #2; American Homes, Jan. 1896		
I.G. Lazzelle House (515 Grand St.)	Morgantown	West Virginia	1901	Standing	MD2 #3		
Joseph Lytle House (509 Chenault Ave.)	Hoquiam	Washington	1901	Standing	NMD #58B; MD #10; NRHP		
Morris House (826 Main St.)	Reedville	Virginia	1901 (approx.)	Standing	MD3 #38		
Murphy-Burroughs House (2505 First St.)	Fort Myers	Florida	1901	Standing	MD3 #45		
Andrew Jackson Sherwood House (257 E. Main St.)	Coquille	Oregon	1901	Standing	NRHP (#92001314)		
Tacon-Barfield Mansion (1216 Government St.)	Mobile	Alabama	1901	Standing	MD3 #24; NRHP contributing property (Oakleigh Garden Historic District)		
Waddell House (2404 Caroline St.)	Houston	Texas	1901 (approx.)	Demolished	MD3 #2; American Homes, Jan. 1896		
West House (109 Lynn St.)	Viola	Tennessee	1901	Standing	CS2 #41		
287 Boblett Street	Blaine	Washington	1902	Standing	MD #266		
1120 S. Fourth Street	Pekin	Illinois	1902	Standing	MD3 #43		
1205 Main Street	Highland	Illinois	1902 (approx.)	Standing	MD3 #23-E		
Bullock-Dew House (8162 Old Raleigh Rd.)	Sims	North Carolina	1902 (approx.)	Standing	NRHP (#86000759)		
Archibald Napoleon Cardwell House (2668 Boyd's Creek Hwy.)	Boyd's Creek	Tennessee	1902	Standing	CS2 #1		
Councill House (118 3rd Ave. NE)	Hickory	North Carolina	1902	Standing			
James Fleming House (302 S. Greene St.)	Greenville	North Carolina	1902	Standing	NRHP (#83001903)		
Jacob W. Gladden House (505 N. Main St.)	Salem	Indiana	1902	Standing			
Charles E. Hasard House (105 W. A Ave.)	Drain	Oregon	1902	Standing	CS2 #33, modified		
William Mills House (212 First St.)	Osawatomie	Kansas	1902	Standing	MD3 #29; NRHP		
William Van Patten House	Grinnell	Iowa	1902	Standing	NRHP		
Rosemont (G.F. Barber House) (1715 Washington Ave.)	Knoxville	Tennessee	1902 (approx.)	Demolished	ART #552		
Mrs. Margaret Shifflet House	Grinnell	Iowa	1902	Standing	NRHP		
Short-Dodson House (755 Park Ave.)	Hot Springs	Arkansas	1902	Standing	NRHP (#76000409)		
Mrs. J.W. Taylor House (703 Luttrell St.)	Knoxville	Tennessee	1902 (approx.)	Standing	MD3 #34-E; ART #265; NRHP contributing property (Fourth and Gill Historic District)		
Woolery House (170 W Second St.)	Ione	Oregon	1902	Standing	NMD #91-B		
1712 Niles Avenue	Saint Joseph	Michigan	1903	Standing			
R. P. Anderson House (665 N. Main St.)	Mocksville	North Carolina	1903	Standing	NRHP contributing property (North Main Street Historic District)		
George Ferris Mansion (607 W. Maple St.)	Rawlins	Wyoming	1903	Standing	MD3 #29; NRHP (#82001831)		
Mr. and Mrs. Jacob Fink House	Helena	Arkansas	1903	Standing	AMH5 #748		
First National Bank of Greenville (302 Main St.)	Greenville	Mississippi	1903	Standing	NRHP (#78003195)		
Samuel H. Grabill House (413 Center St.)	Ashland	Ohio	1903	Standing	MD3 #1; NRHP contributing property (Center Street Historic District)		
John A. Graham House (15th St. E)	Bradenton	Florida	1903	Standing	MD #20-F/24-D		
Hackney House (2210 Main St.)	Houston	Texas	1903	Demolished	MD3 #1		
Hall House (102 Masonic St.)	Rockland	Maine	1903 (approx.)	Standing	ART #583		
Edward Washington King House (308 7th St.)	Bristol	Tennessee	1903	Standing	MD3 #1-E; NRHP		
Thomas A. Kluttz House (1003 Eleanor St.)	Knoxville	Tennessee	1903	Standing	MD5 #179; NRHP contributing property (Fourth and Gill Historic District); home of "Barber & Kluttz" partner Thomas A. Kluttz		
Albert E. Krause House (11518 Somerset Ave.)	Princess Anne	Maryland	1903 (approx.)	Standing	MD3 #23-E		
Rhode House	Bryan	Texas	1903 (approx.)	Demolished	MD3 #1		
Roselawn (905 Williams Ave.)	Natchitoches	Louisiana	1903	Standing	NRHP contributing property (Natchitoches Historic District); HABS (LA-1334)		
Dr. T.E. Ross House (416 Bay St.)	Hattiesburg	Mississippi	1903	Standing	NRHP contributing property		
Roys House (603 S. Commerce Ave.)	Russellville	Arkansas	1903	Standing			
Steckert-Gray House (205 NE Sixth Ave.)	Gainesville	Florida	1903	Standing	MD3 #37		
150 Duncan Mansion Drive	Silex	Missouri	1904	Standing	MD3 #1		
604 N. Court Street	Quitman	Georgia	1904	Standing			
623 W. Third Street	Maryville	Missouri	1904	Standing			
930 W. Water Street	Elmira	New York	1904	Standing			
3310 W. 12th Street	Little Rock	Arkansas	1904	Standing	MD3 #43		
Annamede (U.S. Hwy 19)	Walkersville	West Virginia	1904	Standing	NRHP (#87000218)		
Roscoe G. Briggs House (111 N. Park Ave.)	Wilson	North Carolina	1904	Standing	MD3 #9		
Albert Bishop Chance House	Centralia	Missouri	1904	Standing	NRHP		
F. F. Handschy House (2331 Elm St.)	Eldridge, Bellingham	Washington	1904	Standing	NMD #66		
E.C. Houston House	Tekamah	Nebraska	1904	Standing	MD #205; MD3 #9		
Robert D. Moreton House (613 S. Jackson St.)	Brookhaven	Mississippi	1904	Standing	Same design as A.E. Moreton, Jr. House; NRHP (#95001188)		
Nickel-McClure Mansion (Buena Vista) (1301 Locust St.)	Alva	Oklahoma	1904	Standing			
John Padgett House (424 Northeast 6th St.)	Gainesville	Florida	1904	Standing	MD3 #4		
			1905	Standing	Owner has original Barber plans		
	Andalusia	Alabama	1905 (approx.)	Standing	MD5 #768		
	Selma	Alabama	1905 (approx.)	Standing	ART #599; AMH5 #792/809D		
Main Street	Pikeville	Tennessee	1905	Standing			
239 N. Woodlawn Drive	Crawford	Georgia	1905 (approx.)	Standing	Modern American Homes, 1905		
308 W. Wilson Street	Cleburne	Texas	1905	Standing			
507 W. Main Street	Franklin	West Virginia	1905	Standing			
516 Lovenia Street	Knoxville	Tennessee	1905 (approx.)	Standing	ART #599; AMH5 #792/809D; NRHP contributing property (Fourth and Gill Historic District)		
602 S. Seminole Avenue	Okmulgee	Oklahoma	1905 (approx.)	Standing	MD3 #23-E		
10680 S. Middle Road	Edinburg	Virginia	1905	Standing			
Manly Barber House (1620 Washington Ave.)	Knoxville	Tennessee	1905	Standing	Keith's Magazine, January 1905 #A71; MD #239; MD3 #19; NRHP contributing property (Park City Historic District); Manly was George Barber's brother		
Isaiah Fearing House (203 W. Main St.)	Elizabeth City	North Carolina	1905 (approx.)	Standing	NRHP contributing property (Elizabeth City Historic District)		
Fred Goeller House (234 Riverside Dr.)	Klamath Falls	Oregon	1905	Standing	CS2 #56; NRHP (#98000624)		
W.A. Jones House (307 Lake Ave.)	Storm Lake	Iowa	1905 (approx.)	Standing	Modern American Homes, 1905 #800		
Adrian A. Montague House (1028 N. Main St.)	Hattiesburg	Mississippi	1905	Standing	MD3 #4; NRHP contributing property (North Main Street Historic District)		
A.E. Moreton, Jr., House (610 S. Jackson St.)	Brookhaven	Mississippi	1905	Standing	Same design as Robert D. Moreton House; NRHP (#99000384)		
George Westfall House (393 Hawthorne St.)	Houston	Texas	1905	Standing	ART #580		
Eugene Wilson House (941 Eleanor St.)	Knoxville	Tennessee	1905	Standing	MD #205; MD3 #9; NRHP contributing property (Fourth and Gill Historic District)		
3 S. Somerset Avenue	Crisfield	Maryland	1906	Standing	MD3 #37		
421 N. Douglas Street	Sedan	Kansas	1906	Standing	MD #26		
1211 Westwood Court	Chippewa Falls	Wisconsin	1906	Standing	MD3 #4		
20286 W. Ridge Avenue	Galesville	Wisconsin	1906	Standing			
A.F. Dantzler House (5005 Griffin St.)	Moss Point	Mississippi	1906	Standing	CS3 #134; NRHP		
Fairchild House (295 S. Main St.)	Monticello	Kentucky	1906	Standing			
Philip Francis House (462 Welch St.)	Jellico	Tennessee	1906	Standing	MD3 #37		
Luther C. Gracy House (314 NE Fourth Ave.)	Gainesville	Florida	1906	Standing	MD3 #3		
William O. Howard House (108 E. Park Ave.)	Tarboro	North Carolina	1906 (approx.)	Standing	NMD #6; NRHP contributing property (Tarboro Historic District)		
Jane Field Jones House (611 E. Jones St.)	Beeville	Texas	1906	Standing	American Homes, Nov. 1896; MD2 #20; MD3 #4-E; HI pp. 36–38		
Dr. Martin Luther Malloy House (248 Wilson Ave.)	Eutaw	Alabama	1906	Standing	ART #552		
Matthew McClung House (1625 W. Clinch Ave.)	Knoxville	Tennessee	1906	Demolished			
Rosenstihl-Reid House (107 S. Martin Luther King Jr. Blvd.)	Union Springs	Alabama	1906	Standing	MD3 #43		
Philip Rothman House (1900 Clark St.)	Stevens Point	Wisconsin	1906	Standing			
Saul-Garry House	Coupland	Texas	1906	Standing	MD3 #43		
James C. Twiss House (298 N. Page St.)	Aviston	Illinois	1907	Standing	MD2 #27; NRHP (#10000020)		
321 Minturn Avenue	Hamlet	North Carolina	1907	Standing	xxx #775		
1348 Heights Boulevard	Houston	Texas	1907 (approx.)	Standing	Keith's Magazine, Sep. 1906		
Cotter House (499 Fairmount Ave.)	Jamestown	New York	1907	Standing	CS2 #1		
Robert Covington House (S. Extension St.)	Hazlehurst	Mississippi	1907	Standing	NRHP (#84002139)		
J.N. Donahoo House (7th and Columbia Streets)	Plainview	Texas	1907	Moved to unknown location	MD3 #43		
Ennis-Handy House (202 W. 13th St.)	Goodland	Kansas	1907	Standing	MD3 #37		
Holleman-Foy House (215 W. Broad St.)	Eufaula	Alabama	1907	Standing	MD5 #188		
Lampton-Thompson-Bourne House (423 Church St.)	Columbia	Mississippi	1907	Standing	ART #552/CS2 #54; NRHP (#98001335)		
Mechanics' National Bank (612 S. Gay St.)	Knoxville	Tennessee	1907 (approx.)	Standing	Barber, Kluttz & Graf		
Olcott House (420 S. State St.)	North Vernon	Indiana	1907	Standing	NRHP contributing property (State Street Historic District)		
Raper Building (Court Sq.)	Lexington	North Carolina	1907 (approx.)	Standing	NRHP contributing property (Uptown Lexington Historic District)		
Rodgers House (1146 Rodgers St.)	Chesapeake	Virginia	1907	Standing			
Sitgreaves House (428 W. Farley Ave.)	Laurens	South Carolina	1907	Standing	CS3 #134; MD3 #36-E		
Lawrence Tyson House (Volunteer Blvd.)	Knoxville	Tennessee	1907	Standing	R; NRHP (#12000467); home of General Lawrence Tyson; now the University of Tennessee's Tyson Alumni House		
103 Bolton Avenue	Alexandria	Louisiana	1908	Standing	MD3 #4		
519 N. D Street	Herington	Kansas	1908	Standing	MD3 #37		
William Orr House (521 E. Columbus Ave.)	Bellefontaine	Ohio	1908	Standing	MD3 #1		
Townsend House (131 E. Fifth Ave.)	Mount Carmel	Illinois	1908	Standing	MD3 #7		
1222 Fern St.	New Orleans	Louisiana	1909	Standing	MD5 #205; owner has plans		
1103 Greenwood Avenue	Canon City	Colorado	1909	Standing			
John L. Boyd House (1131 Circle Park)	Knoxville	Tennessee	1909 (approx.)	Demolished			
Robert Lee Hardy House (207 S. Main St.)	Monticello	Arkansas	1909	Standing	NRHP (#82002113)		
John Yates Johnston House (411 W. Main Ave.)	Knoxville	Tennessee	1909	Demolished	R; addition and renovation of former Elks Home.		
Walter Scott Montgomery House (314 S. Pine St.)	Spartanburg	South Carolina	1909	Standing	NRHP (#84000345)		
Park City High School	Knoxville	Tennessee	1909	Demolished	Designed with R. F. Graf		
Pruitt-Wheeler-Whitmer House	Gainesville	Georgia	1909	Standing	MD3 #1; NRHP contributing property (Green Street Historic District)		
	Litchfield	Connecticut	1900s	Standing	Keith's Magazine, January 1905 #A71; MD #239; MD3 #19		
High Street	Franklin	West Virginia	1900s	Standing			
Main Street	Pikeville	Tennessee	1900s	Standing	MD3 #37		
32 E. Bayard Street	Seneca Falls	New York	1900s	Standing			
213 W. Madison Street	Sandusky	Ohio	1900s	Standing			
237 W. Atwood Street	Galion	Ohio	1900s	Standing			
301 Onondaga Avenue	Syracuse	New York	1900s	Standing	MD3 #7; in 2020, owned by the Greater Syracuse Land Bank		
308 Seventh Street	Charleston	Illinois	1900s	Standing			
400 E. High Street	Mount Vernon	Ohio	1900s	Standing			
410 E. Cypress Street	Charleston	Missouri	1900s	Standing			
515 Goodin Avenue	Charleston	Missouri	1900s	Standing			
521 S. Hennepin Avenue	Dixon	Illinois	1900s	Standing	MD3 #7/#10		
716 S. High Street	Trenton	Tennessee	1900s	Standing	MD3 #35-E		
1353 Chestnut Street	Bowling Green	Kentucky	1900s	Standing	MD #239; MD3 #19		
73640 S. Fulton Street	Armada	Michigan	1900	Standing	NMD #6		
Austin House (417 Bay St.)	Hattiesburg	Mississippi	1900s	Standing	MD #213; MD3 #14		
David C. Boyd House (449 Harding Way West)	Galion	Ohio	1900s	Standing	MD3 #38		
John S. Crowell House (1127 E. High St.)	Springfield	Ohio	1900s	Standing			
Dent House (501 S. McArthur St.)	Salem	Missouri	1900s	Standing	MD3 #43		
William W. Jones House (511 S. Broadway)	Corpus Christi	Texas	1900s	Demolished	MD5 pp. 196–197		
Knoxville Motor & Garage (State St.)	Knoxville	Tennessee	1900s	Demolished			
McKinney Apartments (603 W. Hill Ave.)	Knoxville	Tennessee	1900s	Demolished			
Peters House (1319 Grainger Ave.)	Knoxville	Tennessee	1900s	Standing	R; NRHP (#99000364)		
Phillips House (307 E. 2nd N. St.)	Morristown	Tennessee	1900s	Standing	CS2 #44; NRHP (#96000384)		
William A. Short House (317 Biscoe St.)	Helena	Arkansas	1900s	Standing			
Judge L.A. Smith House (504 Salem Ave.)	Holly Springs	Mississippi	1900s	Standing	NRHP contributing property		
106 W. Whitney Street	Hamilton	Texas	1910	Standing	MD3 #37		
301 N. Twelfth Street	Ballinger	Texas	1910	Standing	MD3 #43		
709 N. Roan Street	Johnson City	Tennessee	1910 (approx.)	Standing	NMD #6		
Orth Galloway House (504 Park St.)	Clarendon	Arkansas	1910	Standing	NRHP (#80000779)		
Hays-Hood House (906 E. Park Ave.)	Tallahassee	Florida	1910	Standing	MD3 #36-E; AMH5 #769; NRHP contributing property (Magnolia Heights Historic District); now the Florida Trust for Historic Preservation's Florida Trust House		
George E. Holland House (803 N. Sixth St.)	Orange	Texas	1910 (approx.)	Standing	MD3 #43		
Arendt Jensen Mansion (1431 Ezell St.)	Gardnerville	Nevada	1910	Standing	MD #205; MD3 #9; NRHP		
Sheffield Village Hall (239 S. Main St.)	Sheffield	Illinois	1910	Standing	NRHP		
Sidna Allen House (5935 Fancy Gap Highway)	Hillsville	Virginia	1911	Standing	MD3 #43		
426 Craig Street	Hillsboro	Texas	1912	Standing			
George Perkins House (803 W. Main St.)	Sac City	Iowa	1912	Standing	NRHP		
George F. Barber Cottage (1701 E. Glenwood Ave.)	Knoxville	Tennessee	1913	Standing			
Dred and Ellen Yelverton House (1979 Hwy. 222 E.)	Fremont	North Carolina	1913 (approx.)	Standing	NRHP (#09000662)		
Love Street	Erwin	Tennessee	1914 (approx.)	Altered	MD3 #23-E		
423 Love Street	Erwin	Tennessee	1914	Altered	MD3 #23-E		
542 Watauga Avenue	Knoxville	Tennessee	1915	Standing	The house has original paperwork from Geo. F. Barber & Co., but it is over-stamped "Barber & Ryno"		
208 Clinton Avenue East	Big Stone Gap	Virginia	1910s	Standing	AMH #783		
14 Park Place	Woonsocket	Rhode Island	1889	Standing (as of August 2020)	CS2 #41 As of 9 August 2020, the house is in very poor shape, especially the exterior.		
R.B. Gaines House (304 S Main St)	Saint John	Washington	1906	Standing	MD3 #37		

== See also ==
- List of BarberMcMurry works
