= Watkins House (Richmond, Missouri) =

Historic house in Missouri, United States

- U.S. National Register of Historic Places
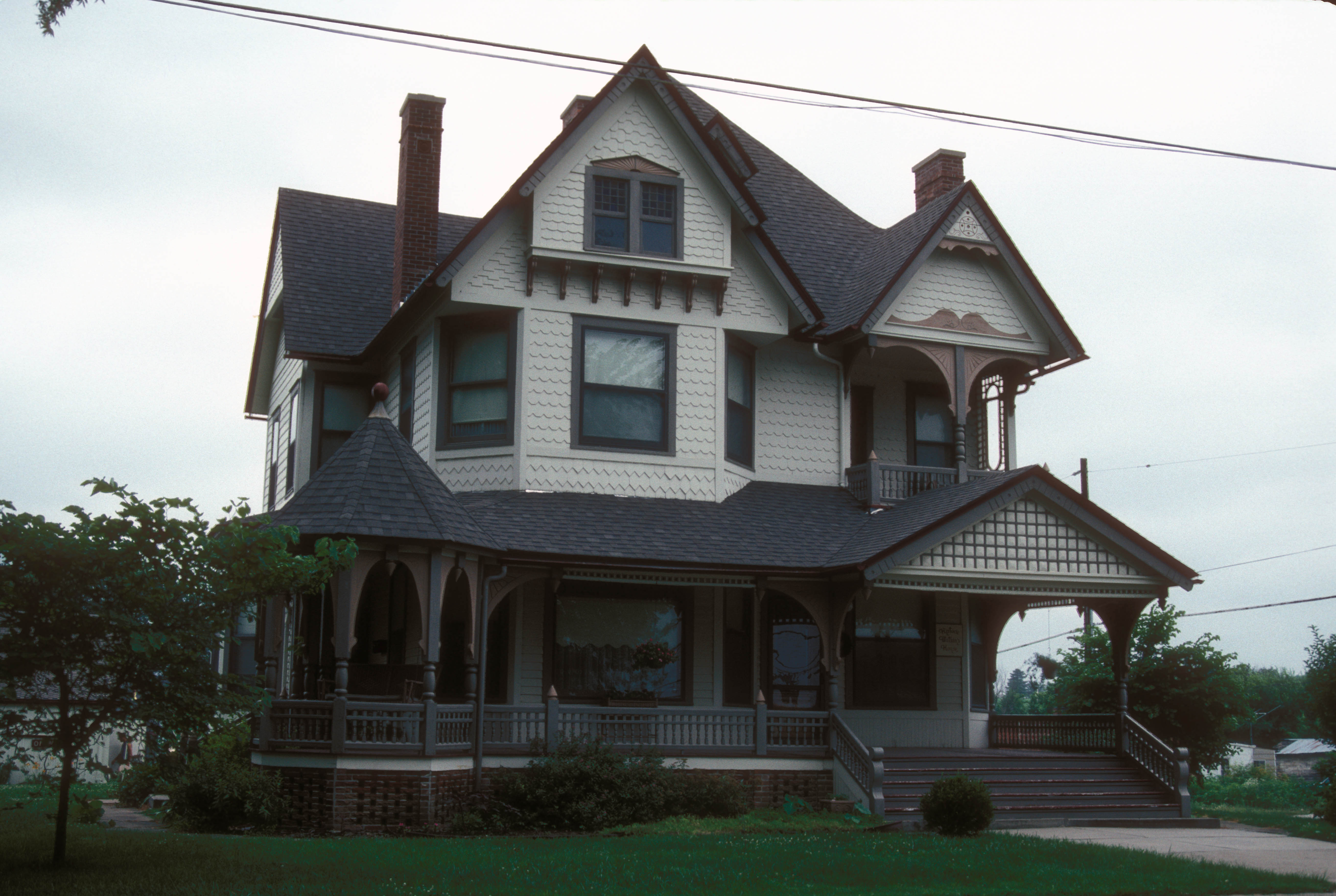
- Watkins House, January 2007

- Location within Missouri Location within the United States
- Location: 302 S. Camden St., Richmond, Missouri
- Coordinates: 39°16′36″N 93°58′45″W
- Area: 0.4 acres (0.16 ha)
- Built: c. 1890
- Architect: Barber, George F.
- Architectural style: Queen Anne
- NRHP reference No.: 83001036
- Added to NRHP: February 10, 1983

Watkins House is a historic home located at 302 South Camden Street, Richmond, Ray County, Missouri. It was designed by architect George F. Barber and built about 1890. It is a 2 1/2-story, Queen Anne style frame dwelling sheathed in five different types of shingles. It features an encircling porch connected with a turreted hexagonal corner tower; a projecting attic gable with a recessed porch; a pedimented and projecting dormer; carved wood panels; and a chimney with ornate terra cotta panels.

It was added to the National Register of Historic Places in 1983.

== See also ==
- List of George Franklin Barber works
