= Donnelly House (Mount Dora, Florida) =

Historic house in Florida, United States

- U.S. National Register of Historic Places
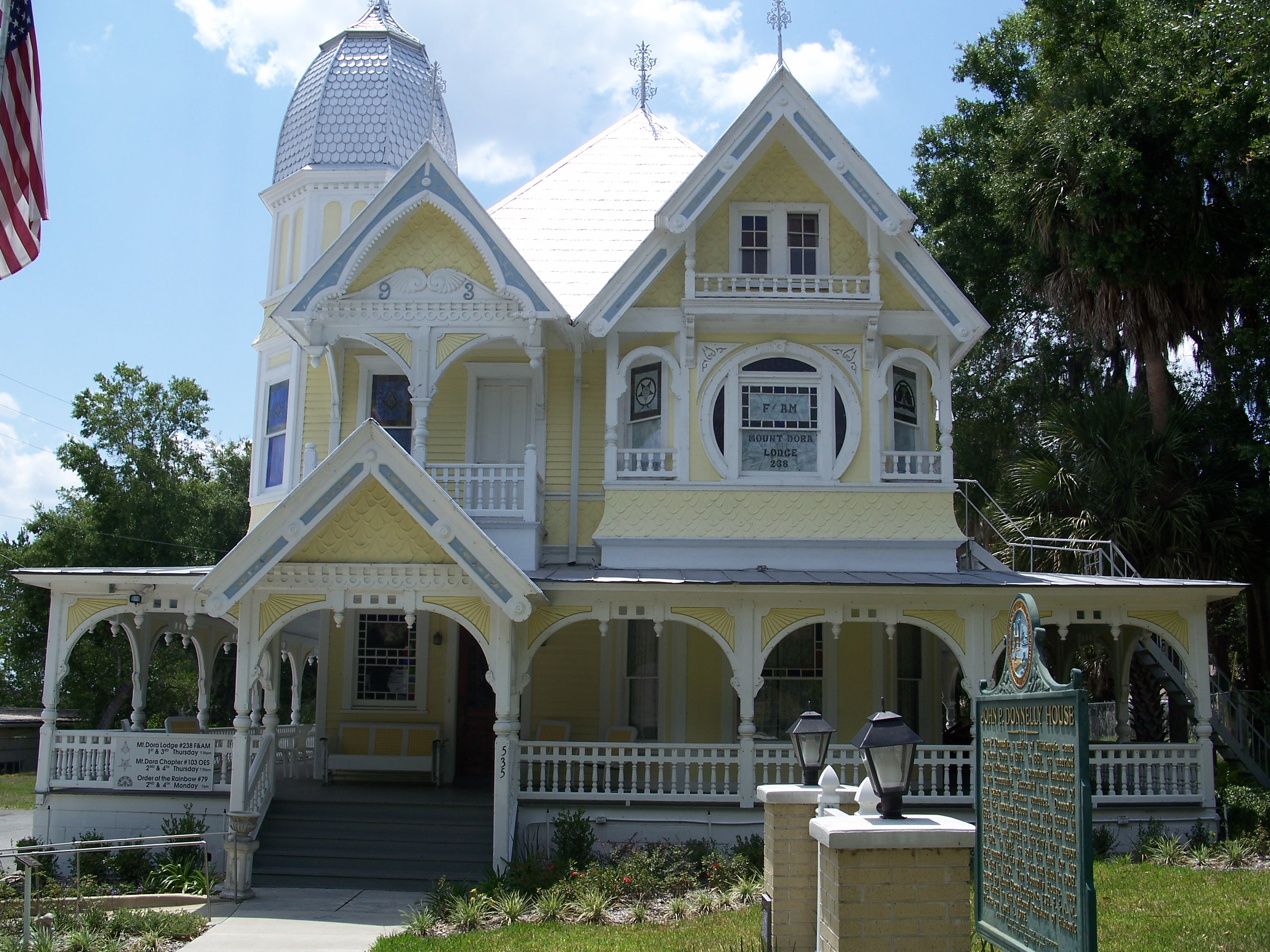

- Location within Florida
- Location: Mount Dora, Florida
- Coordinates: 28°48′2″N 81°38′42″W
- Built: 1893
- Architect: George Franklin Barber
- Architectural style: Queen Anne, Stick/Eastlake
- NRHP reference No.: 75000560
- Added to NRHP: April 4, 1975

The Donnelly House (also known as the Mt. Dora Lodge No. 238 F&AM) is a historic home in Mount Dora, Florida. It is located on Donnelly Avenue. On April 4, 1975, it was added to the U.S. National Register of Historic Places.

John P. Donnelly, a native of Pittsburgh, moved to Mount Dora in 1879. In 1881, he married Annie McDonald Stone, a prominent landholder in the community. Successful in a number of real estate and business ventures, Donnelly built this imposing Queen Anne style house in 1893. He was among the founders of the local yacht club, and served as the city's first mayor in 1910. In 1924, he sold the land for the park named for his wife, who had died in 1908. He died in 1930. The Donnelly House, now owned by Mount Dora Lodge #238, F.&A.M., was listed in the National Register of Historic Places on April 4, 1975.

== See also ==
- List of George Franklin Barber works
