= Monterey Place =

Historic house in Alabama, United States

- U.S. National Register of Historic Places
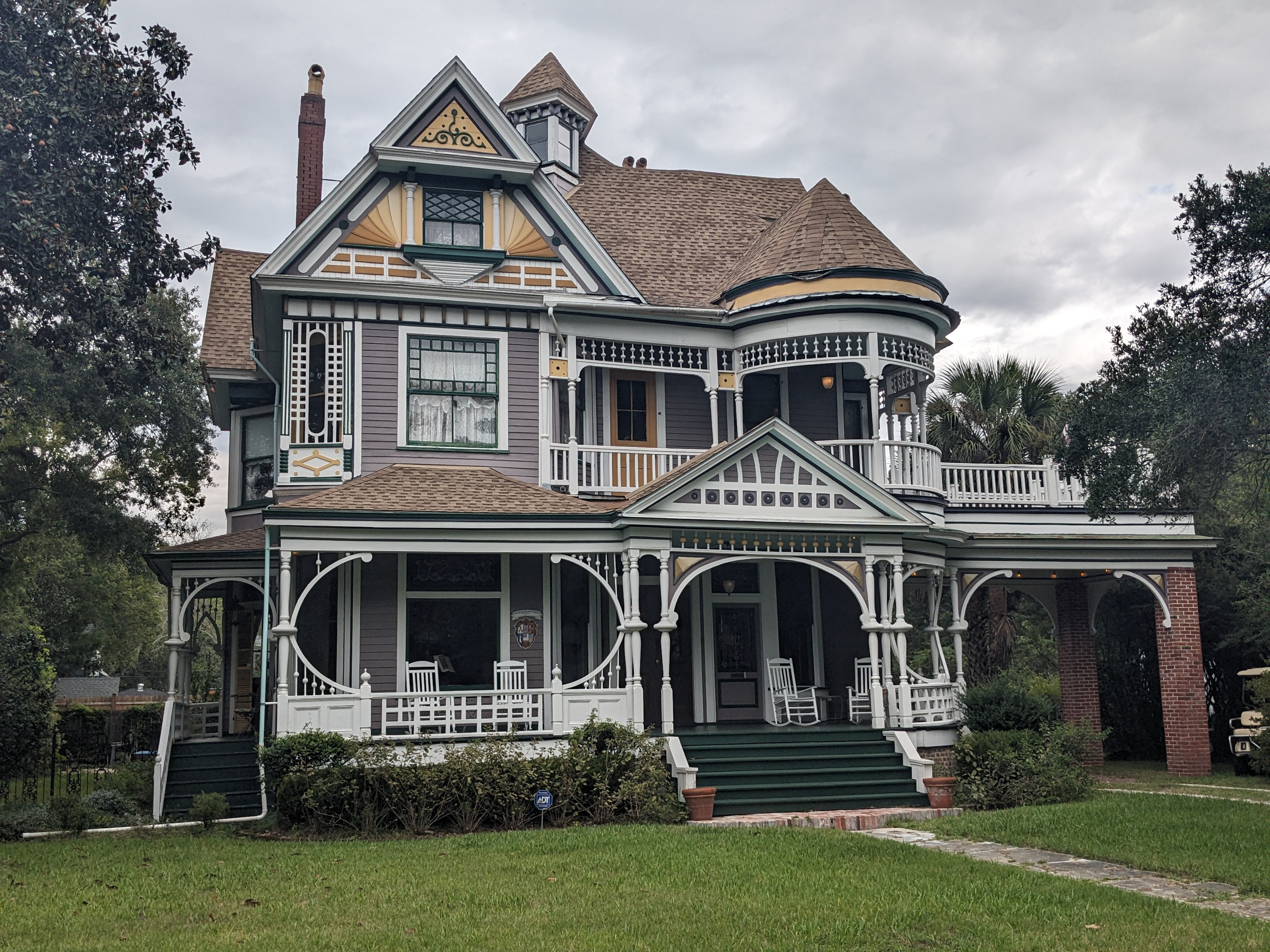
- The house in 2023

- Location within Mobile, Alabama Location within Alabama Location within the United States
- Location: 1552 Monterey Place; Mobile, Alabama
- Coordinates: 30°41′4″N 88°4′26″W
- Area: less than one acre
- Built: 1897
- Architect: George Franklin Barber
- Architectural style: Queen Anne
- NRHP reference No.: 84000680
- Added to NRHP: January 5, 1984

Monterey Place, best known as the Shepard House, is a historic residence in Mobile, Alabama, United States. The house was designed by architect George Franklin Barber in 1897 for Charles Martin Shepard, the general passenger agent for the Mobile and Ohio Railroad in Mobile. Shepard's daughters, Kate and Isabel, began to use the house as a boarding school in 1910.

The house features elaborate Queen Anne details, eleven fireplaces, and several stained glass windows. The slightly later neighborhood surrounding the mansion, as well as the street, are also named Monterey Place. It was placed on the National Register of Historic Places on January 5, 1984. The house was opened as a bed and breakfast inn about 2002. In February 2008, the house and current owners were filmed for an episode of Home & Garden Television's If Walls Could Talk.

== See also ==
- List of George Franklin Barber works
