= Walter Scott Montgomery House =

Historic house in South Carolina, United States

- U.S. National Register of Historic Places
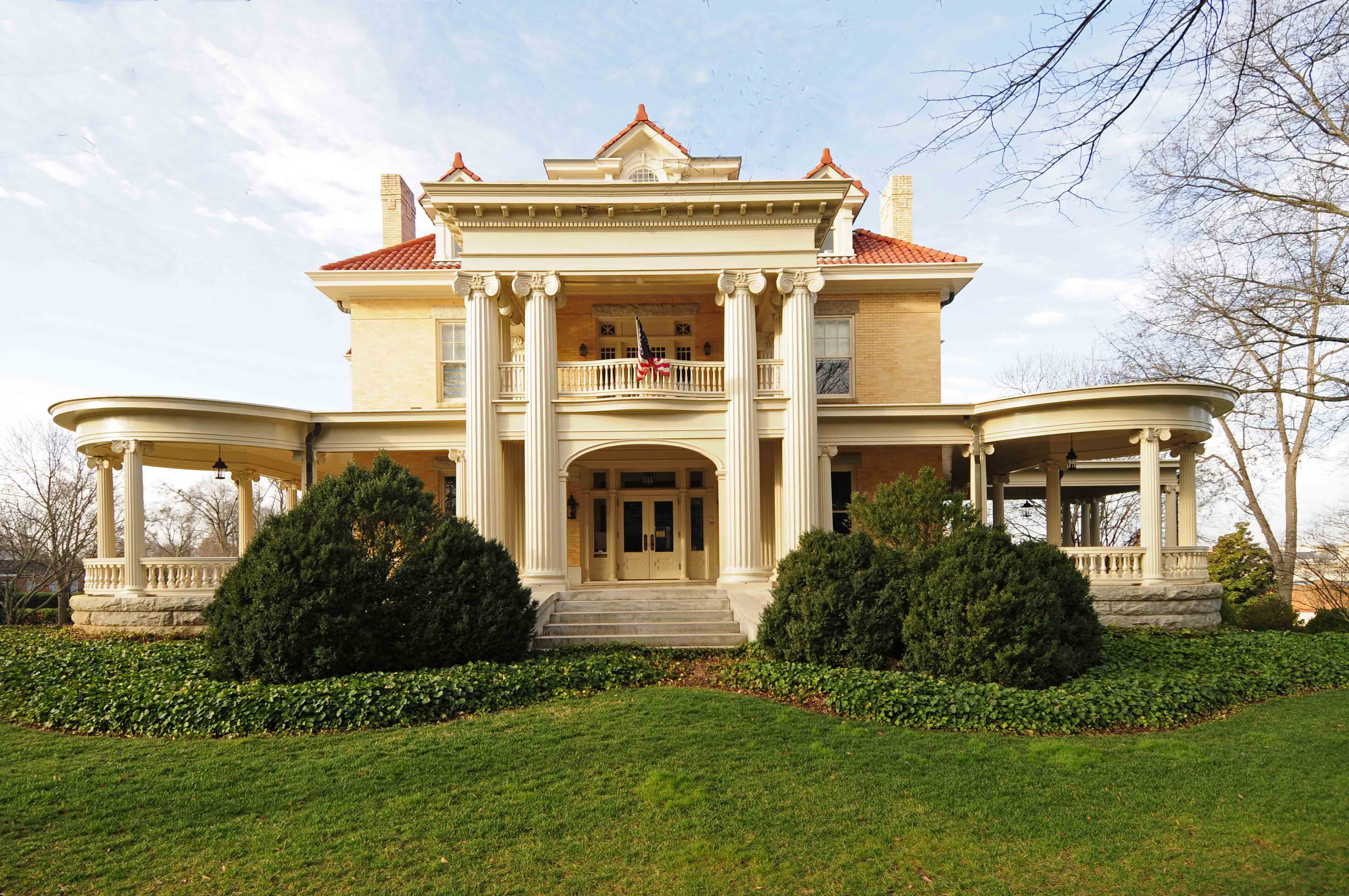
- Walter Scott Montgomery Home, February 2012

- Location within South Carolina Location within the United States
- Location: 314 S. Pine St., Spartanburg, South Carolina
- Coordinates: 34°56′50″N 81°54′59″W
- Area: 2.6 acres (1.1 ha)
- Built: 1909
- Built by: Fiske-Carter Construction
- Architect: Barber, George F.
- Architectural style: Colonial Revival
- NRHP reference No.: 84000345
- Added to NRHP: November 1, 1984

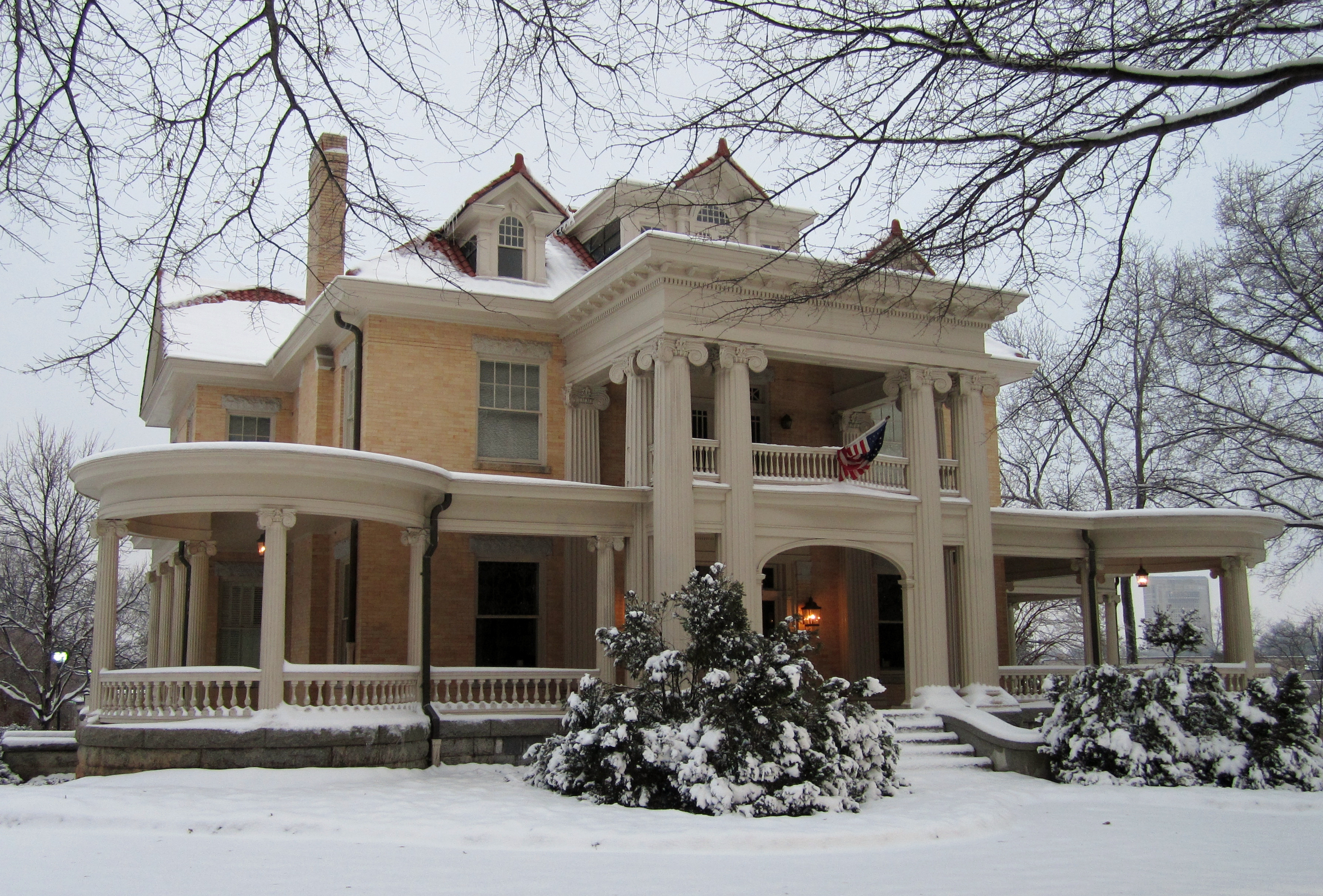

Walter Scott Montgomery House is a historic home located at Spartanburg, Spartanburg County, South Carolina. It was designed by architect George Franklin Barber and built in 1909. It is a 2 1/2-story, frame, yellow brick-veneer residence in the Colonial Revival style. building is of frame construction with a yellow brick veneer and a red tile roof. It features a distinctive portico and leaded glass windows. Also on the property is a one-story, reinforced concrete auto garage (c. 1923).

It was listed on the National Register of Historic Places in 1984.
