= George and Lola Perkins House =

Historic house in Iowa, United States

- U.S. National Register of Historic Places
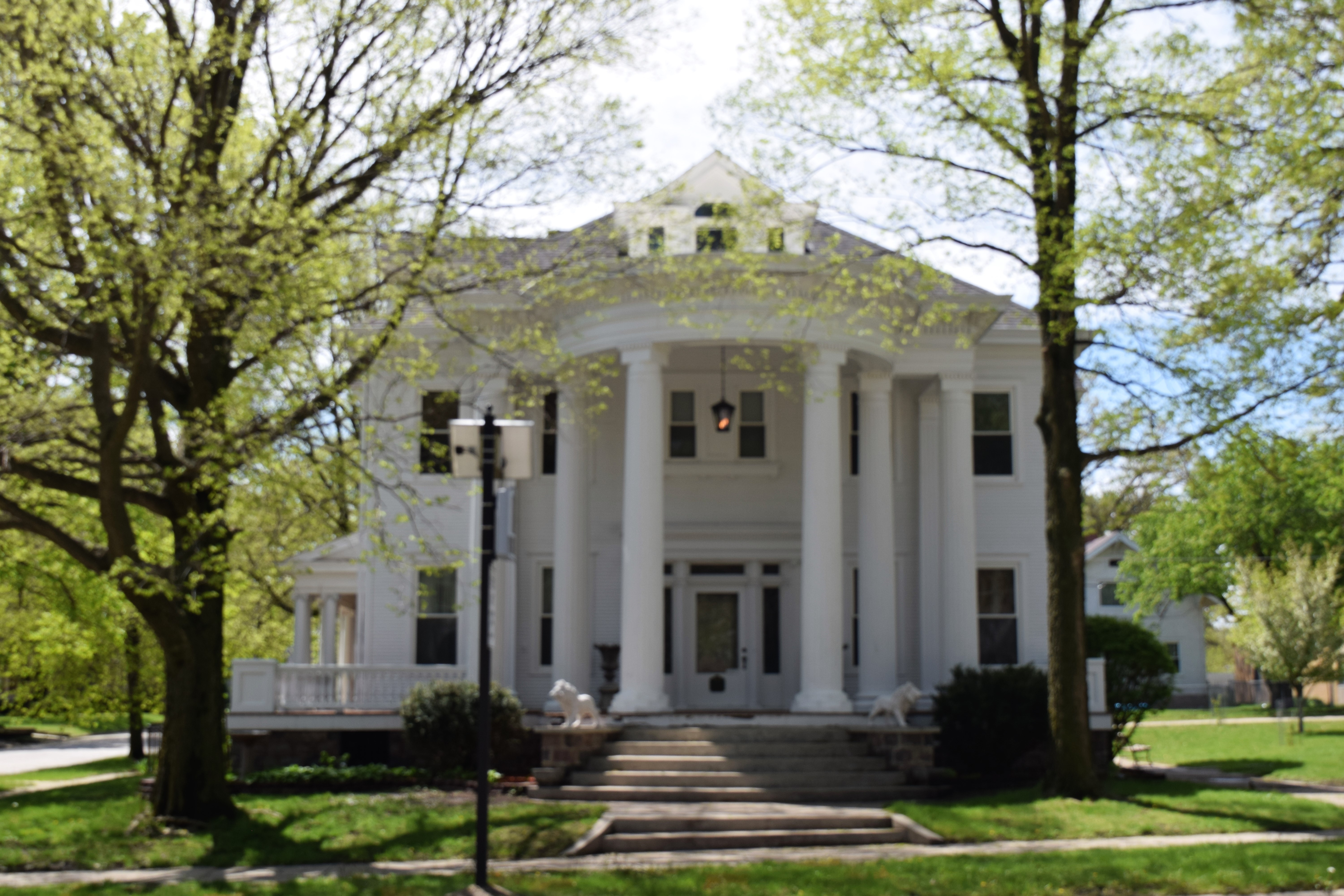

- Location within Iowa Location within the United States
- Location: 803 W. Main St. Sac City, Iowa
- Coordinates: 42°25′19.1″N 94°59′34.8″W
- Built: 1912
- Built by: Elmer Larson
- Architect: George Barber
- Architectural style: Colonial Revival
- NRHP reference No.: 15000997
- Added to NRHP: January 26, 2016

The George and Lola Perkins House is a historic building located in Sac City, Iowa, United States. George B. Perkins was a Wisconsin native who served as the president of First National Bank, and two terms in the Iowa House of Representatives, two terms the Iowa Senate, and Mayor of Sac City as a Republican. Lola was from a prominent local family, and was college educated. She purchased the lot that this house was built on in 1905.

The house was designed by George F. Barber of Knoxville, Tennessee, who was known for his published catalogs of house plans. The 2½-story, frame, Colonial Revival features a curved portico on the main facade and roof dormers. There is also a carriage house on the property.

The house was listed on the National Register of Historic Places in 2016.
