= Fred Goeller House =

- U.S. National Register of Historic Places
- Goeller-Caillouette House
- Caillouette, Conrad and Tamara, house
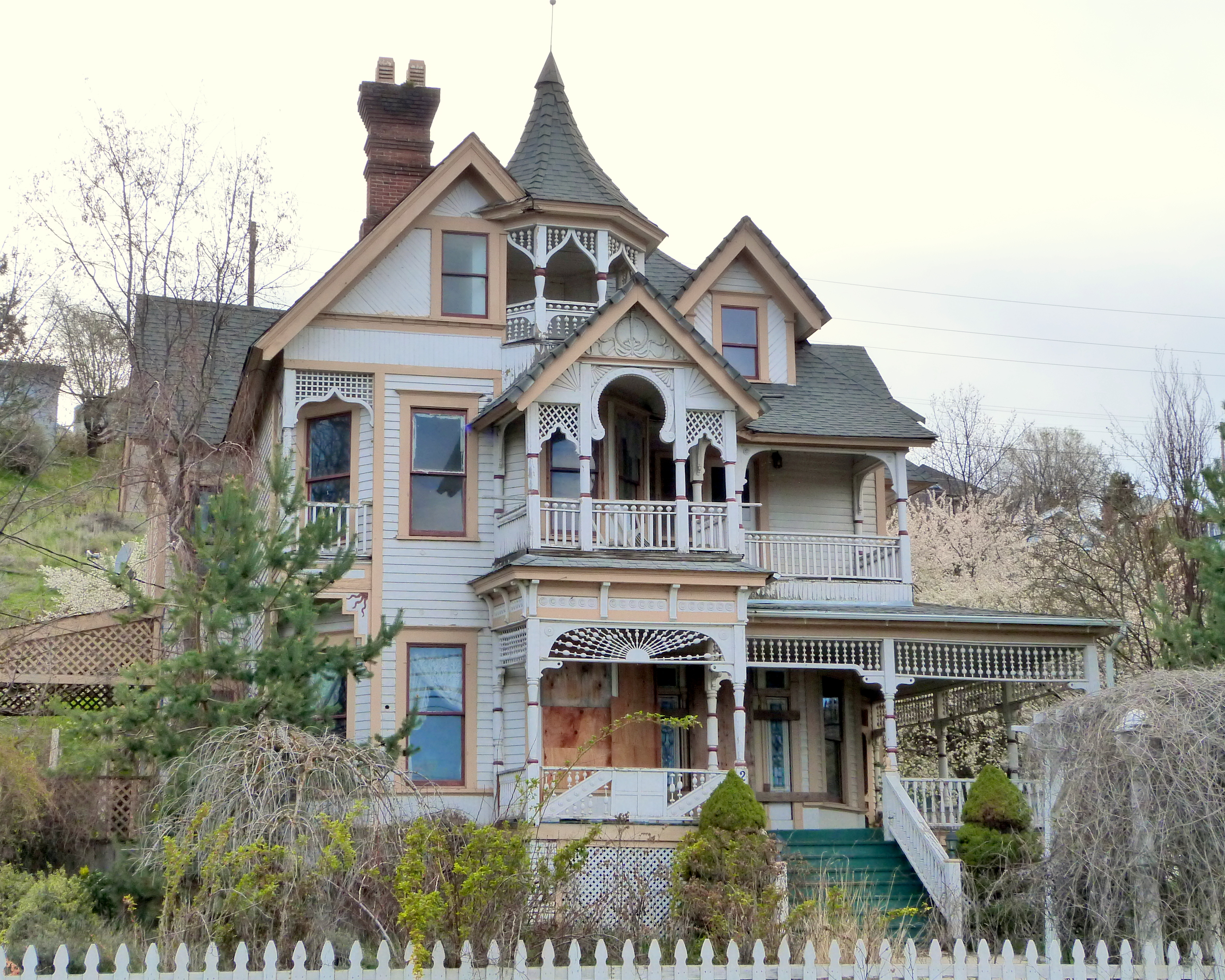
- The Fred Goeller House in Klamath Falls
- Location: 234 South Riverside Street; Klamath Falls, Oregon, U.S.
- Built: 1905
- Architect: George F. Barber
- Architectural style: Queen Anne; Eastlake
- NRHP reference No.: 98000366
- Added to NRHP: April 25, 1998

The Fred Goeller House is a historic building located in Klamath Falls, Oregon. The house is fashioned in a Victorian Style of Architecture.

== Architecture ==
The Fred Goeller house is a two-and-a-half-story building constructed on a brick foundation. The house features hip roofs with dormers and a gable on its east side. Many of the house's piers under the front veranda are enclosed with wood lattice. The building is designed in the Queen Anne/Eastlake style, which is a sub-style of the Victorian architecture.

== History ==
The Fred Goeller House was built by its owner, Fred Goeller between 1900 and 1905. The house sits on a lot slightly larger than one acre; originally the land was home to a planning mill. Fred Goeller arrived in Klamath Falls in 1981 with his wife, Alice Goeller, and their son Harry Goeller.

Although conflicting information exists regarding the home's history, it is a documented mail-order design by George F. Barber. The house was sold in 1995 and was later designated a historic building, appearing on the National Register of Historic Places in 1998.

=== Disrepair (2010s) ===
In 2013, the Fred Goeller House was left in disrepair. According to the Herald and News, a previous owner of the house, Caillouette, had been unable to keep up with renovations; the owner at the time, Tamara Taylor, could not be reached for comment on the building's condition. "During the early days, if Caillouette woke up in the middle of the night to answer nature's call, he had to get in his car and drive to a service station because the home's plumbing didn't work."

By 2015 the house was sold to U.S. Bank for $250,000 at auction. With its door and window boarded up, the property was once again placed on the market.
