= Dr. James L. Lovvorn House =

Historic house in Georgia, United States

- U.S. National Register of Historic Places
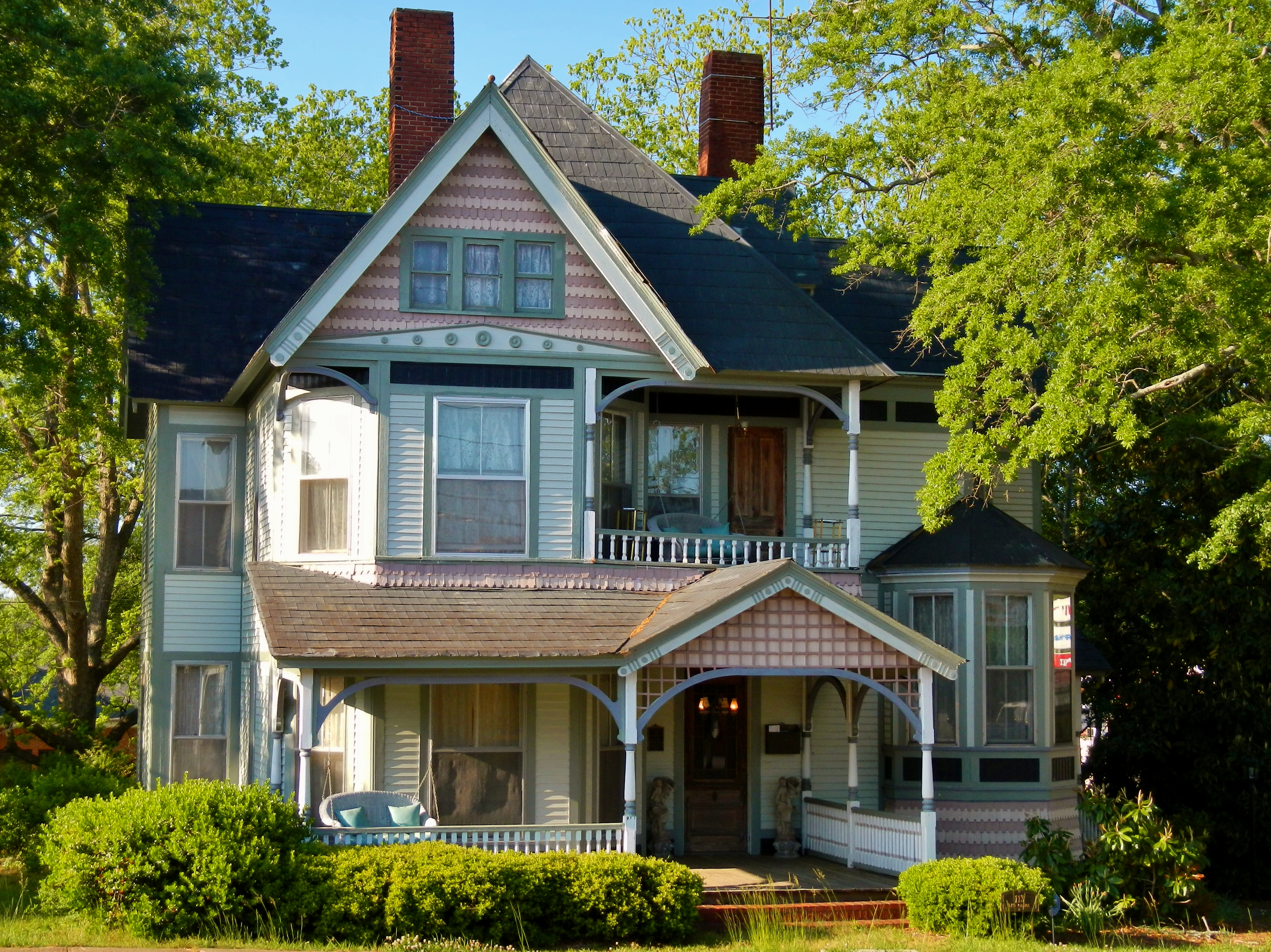

- Location within Georgia Location within the United States
- Location: 113 E. College Street; Bowdon, Georgia
- Coordinates: 33°32′18″N 85°15′11″W
- Area: less than one acre
- Built: 1896
- Architect: George F. Barber
- Architectural style: Queen Anne
- NRHP reference No.: 88000595
- Added to NRHP: May 19, 1988

The Dr. James L. Lovvorn House, built about 1895, is on a corner lot, at 113 East College Street, Bowdon, Carroll County, Georgia, at the intersections of GA 100 and GA 166. The owner, Dr. James Lewis Lovvorn (1862–1926), was a graduate of Bowdon College; Medical College of Georgia, Augusta; and University of Georgia Medical Department, 1886. He was the son of Edward M. and Nancy C. Lovvorn, of Randolph Co, AL.

On December 30, 1888, he married Miss Carrie M. Johnson (1867–1959), the daughter of Thomas P. and Milly Ann King Johnson. Having bought their lot from John Shelnutt in 1888, Dr. Lovvorn and his wife planned the house with gas lights and a fireplace in every room. The architect was George F. Barber. Dr. Lovvorn's medical office was on the first floor. The Queen Anne style house has East Lake-style woodwork throughout and was privately owned and occupied in 2010. It was added to the National Register of Historic Places in 1988, #88000595.
