= Magnolia Heights Historic District =

Historic district in Florida, United States

- U.S. National Register of Historic Places
- U.S. Historic district
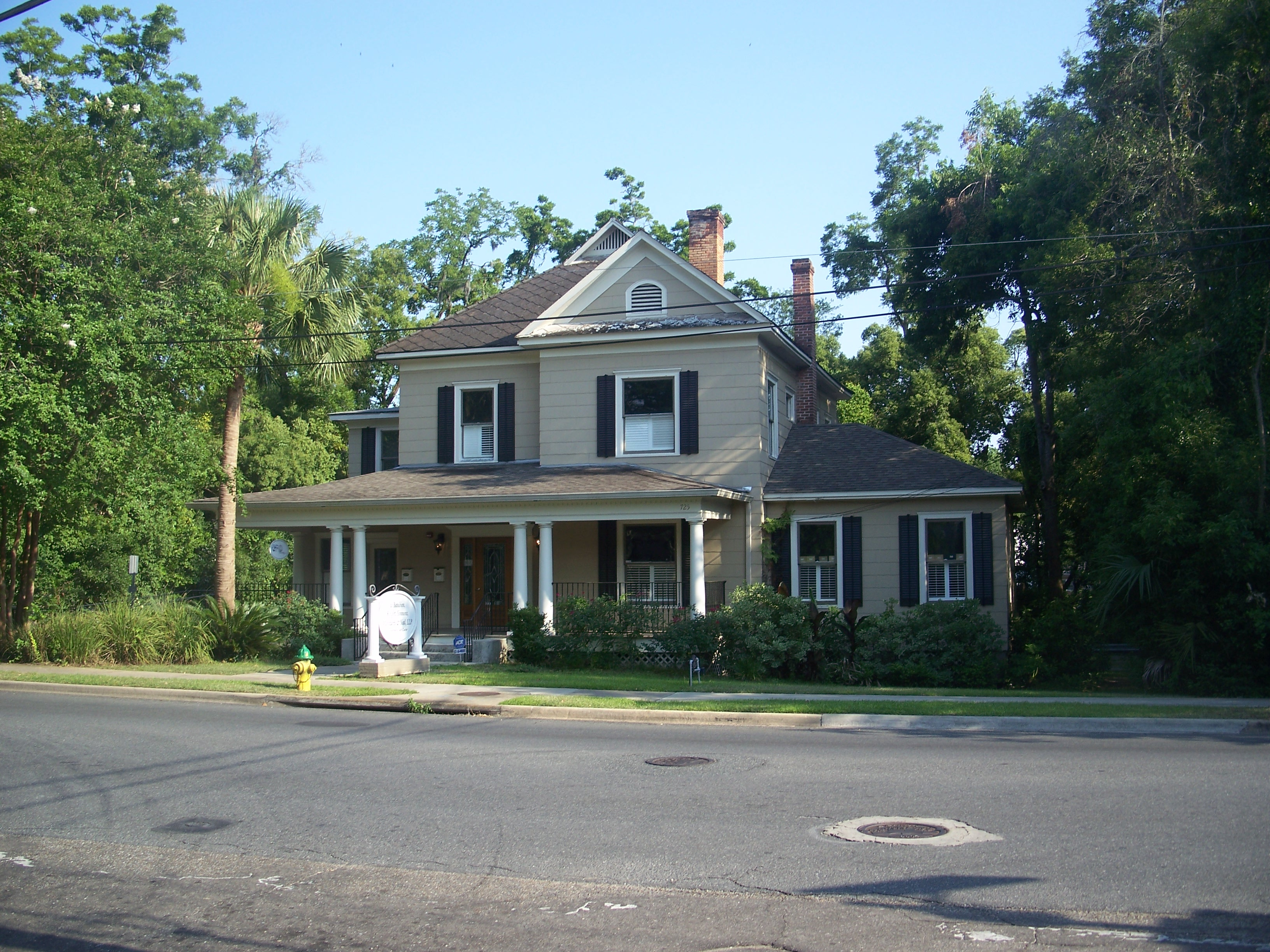

- Location within Florida Location within the United States
- Location: Tallahassee, Florida
- Coordinates: 30°26′30″N 84°16′6″W
- Area: 23.5 acres (95,000 m^{2})
- NRHP reference No.: 84000906
- Added to NRHP: June 29, 1984

The Magnolia Heights Historic District is a U.S. historic district (designated as such on June 29, 1984) located in Tallahassee, Florida. The district runs from 701 through 1005 East Park Avenue, and Cadiz Street. It contains 25 historic buildings.
