= Fort Dale-College Street Historic District =

Historic district in Alabama, United States

- U.S. National Register of Historic Places
- U.S. Historic district
- Alabama Register of Landmarks and Heritage
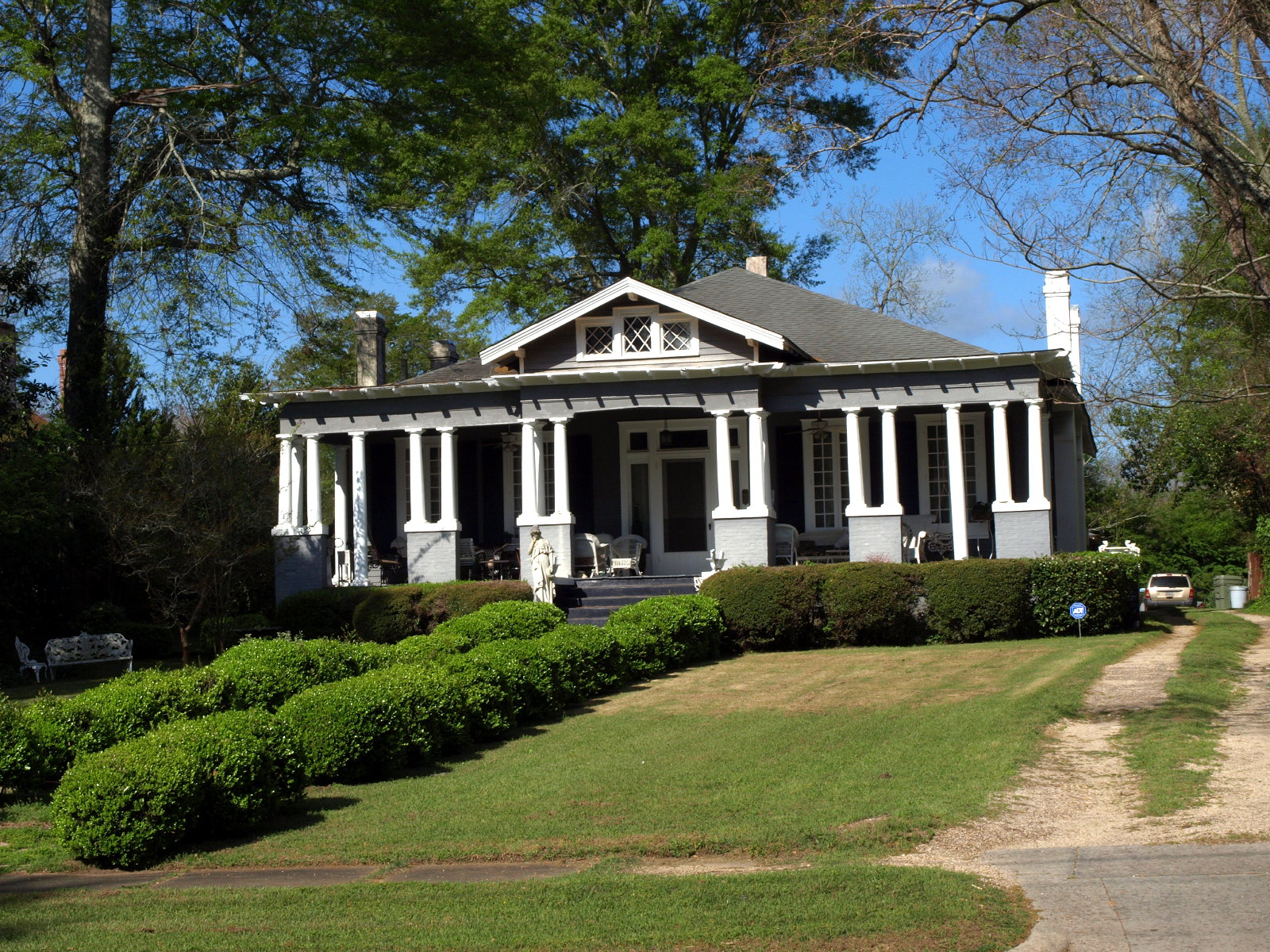
- Thigpen-Powell-Porter-Solomon House in April 2015

- Location within Alabama Location within the United States
- Location: Roughly bounded by Ft. Dale, Hamilton, and N. College Sts., Greenville, Alabama
- Coordinates: 31°50′04″N 86°37′50″W
- Area: 32.5 acres (13.2 ha)
- Architectural style: Late 19th And 20th Century Revivals, Bungalow/Craftsman
- MPS: Greenville MRA
- NRHP reference No.: 86001974

Significant dates
- Added to NRHP: August 28, 1986
- Designated ARLH: March 20, 1980

The Fort Dale-College Street Historic District is a historic district in Greenville, Alabama, United States. The district contains Greenville's oldest existing affluent residences, dating to as early as the 1850s. In the initial federal land sale following the Creek War, the area that became northwest Greenville was claimed by William Dunklin. Dunklin sold the claim to William Burnette, who began to parcel the land for sale and to give to family members. Burnette's daughter and son-in-law built a Corinthian-columned Greek Revival home in 1857. A few other pre-Civil War houses remain, and construction continued after the war, including a school building that was later converted into a house. Most of the early residences were large, and built in Greek Revival, Second Empire, and Colonial Revival styles. Beginning in the 20th century, bungalows and cottages on smaller lots began to emerge. One of the later constructions in the district is a Spanish Colonial Revival house, built in 1928.

The district was listed on the National Register of Historic Places in 1986.
