= National Register of Historic Places listings in Spartanburg County, South Carolina =

Location of Spartanburg County in South Carolina

This is a list of the National Register of Historic Places listings in Spartanburg County, South Carolina.

This is intended to be a complete list of the properties and districts on the National Register of Historic Places in Spartanburg County, South Carolina, United States. The locations of National Register properties and districts for which the latitude and longitude coordinates are included below, may be seen in a map.

There are 75 properties and districts listed on the National Register in the county. Another 4 properties were once listed but have been removed.

This National Park Service list is complete through NPS recent listings posted August 28, 2026.

== Current listings ==
	Name on the Register	Image	Date listed	Location	City or town	Description
1	Alexander House	Alexander House	April 11, 2003 (#03000205)	319 E. Main St. 34°57′03″N 81°55′28″W	Spartanburg	
2	American Legion Building	American Legion Building	April 18, 2003 (#03000271)	94 W. Park Dr. 34°56′03″N 81°54′51″W	Spartanburg	
3	Anderson's Mill	Anderson's Mill	November 14, 1978 (#78002529)	West of Spartanburg off South Carolina Highway 296; 34°52′59″N 82°00′42″W	Spartanburg	
4	Apalache Mill	Apalache Mill	December 15, 2015 (#15000616)	2200 Racing Rd. 34°57′44″N 82°12′30″W	Greer	
5	Arcadia Mill No. 1	Arcadia Mill No. 1	September 30, 2014 (#14000819)	1875 Hayne St. 34°57′25″N 81°59′34″W	Spartanburg	
6	Arcadia Mill No. 2	Arcadia Mill No. 2	October 4, 2005 (#05001158)	100 W. Cleveland St. 34°57′26″N 82°00′00″W	Spartanburg	
7	Archeological Site 38SP11		December 10, 1980 (#80003698)	Address Restricted	Pacolet	
8	Archeological Site 38SP12		December 10, 1980 (#80003699)	Address Restricted	Pacolet	
9	Archeological Site 38SP13		December 10, 1980 (#80003700)	Address Restricted	Pacolet	
10	Archeological Site 38SP17		December 10, 1980 (#80003701)	Address Restricted	Pacolet	
11	Archeological Site 38SP18		December 10, 1980 (#80003702)	Address Restricted	Pacolet	
12	Archeological Site 38SP19		December 10, 1980 (#80003703)	Address Restricted	Pacolet	
13	Archeological Site 38SP20		December 10, 1980 (#80003704)	Address Restricted	Pacolet	
14	Archeological Site 38SP21		December 10, 1980 (#80003705)	Address Restricted	Pacolet	
15	Archeological Site 38SP23		December 10, 1980 (#80003706)	Address Restricted	Pacolet	
16	Archeological Site 38SP52		December 10, 1980 (#80003707)	Address Restricted	Pacolet	
17	Archeological Site 38SP53		December 10, 1980 (#80003708)	Address Restricted	Pacolet	
18	Archeological Site 38SP54		December 10, 1980 (#80003709)	Address Restricted	Pacolet	
19	Archeological Site 38SP57		December 10, 1980 (#80003710)	Address Restricted	Pacolet	
20	Bivings-Converse House	Bivings-Converse House	May 26, 1995 (#95000638)	1 Douglas St. 34°56′34″N 81°50′12″W	Glendale	
21	Bush House	Bush House	October 21, 2003 (#03000695)	3960 New Cut Rd. 35°01′25″N 82°04′26″W	Inman	
22	Camp Hill	Camp Hill	July 6, 1970 (#70000600)	South of Glenn Springs on South Carolina Highway 215; 34°47′22″N 81°48′59″W	Glenn Springs	
23	Central Methodist Church	Central Methodist Church	October 3, 2003 (#03001002)	233 N. Church St. 34°57′09″N 81°56′00″W	Spartanburg	
24	Church of the Advent	Church of the Advent	May 26, 2000 (#00000553)	141 Advent St. 34°56′59″N 81°55′28″W	Spartanburg	
25	Cleveland Law Range	Cleveland Law Range	April 13, 1973 (#73001730)	171 Magnolia St. 34°57′03″N 81°56′04″W	Spartanburg	
26	Converse College Historic District	Converse College Historic District	November 12, 1975 (#75001706)	580 E. Main St. 34°57′18″N 81°55′02″W	Spartanburg	
27	Converse Heights Historic District	Converse Heights Historic District	September 25, 2007 (#07001021)	Southeast of E. Main St. and northeast of Pine St., containing properties along portions of Clifton, Connecticut, & Glendalyn Aves., Hale & Maple Sts., Mills Ave., Norwood St., Otis Blvd., Palmetto, Plume, Poplar, & Rutledge Sts., S. Fairview Ave, and Woodland St. 34°57′05″N 81°54′32″W	Spartanburg	
28	Converse Mill	Converse Mill	October 5, 2015 (#15000709)	200 High St. 34°59′39″N 81°50′16″W	Spartanburg	
29	Cowpens Depot	Cowpens Depot	September 4, 1997 (#97001104)	120 Palmetto St. 35°00′56″N 81°48′10″W	Cowpens	
30	James M. Davis House	James M. Davis House	June 7, 2010 (#10000317)	2763 Old Hwy 14 S 34°51′43″N 82°13′27″W	Pelham	
31	Drayton Mill	Drayton Mill	October 24, 2012 (#12000882)	1802 Drayton Rd. 34°58′12″N 81°54′30″W	Spartanburg	
32	Duncan Park Stadium	Duncan Park Stadium	January 26, 2016 (#15001009)	0 W. Park Dr. 34°56′11″N 81°54′46″W	Spartanburg	
33	Bishop William Wallace Duncan House	Bishop William Wallace Duncan House	October 2, 2009 (#76001712)	300 Howard St. 34°57′17″N 81°56′18″W	Spartanburg	Originally listed on July 12, 1976 and delisted on December 8, 2005; listing date represents a relisting
34	Frank Evans High School	Frank Evans High School	June 27, 2012 (#12000373)	142 S. Dean St. 34°56′57″N 81°55′37″W	Spartanburg	
35	Evans-Russell House	Evans-Russell House	March 21, 2007 (#07000183)	716 Otis Boulevard; 34°57′09″N 81°54′33″W	Spartanburg	
36	Evins-Bivings House	Evins-Bivings House	July 16, 1970 (#70000601)	563 N. Church St. 34°57′35″N 81°56′27″W	Spartanburg	
37	First Presbyterian Church of Woodruff	First Presbyterian Church of Woodruff	January 26, 2005 (#04001563)	300 W. Georgia St. 34°44′19″N 82°02′27″W	Woodruff	
38	Foster's Tavern	Foster's Tavern	December 18, 1970 (#70000602)	191 Cedar Spring Rd. 34°55′18″N 81°53′14″W	Spartanburg	
39	William Dixon Fowler House	William Dixon Fowler House	February 8, 2012 (#12000016)	5885 SC 215; 34°48′46″N 81°50′23″W	Pauline	
40	Fremont School	Fremont School	October 24, 2000 (#00001234)	600 Magnolia St. 34°57′37″N 81°56′47″W	Spartanburg	
41	Glenn Springs Historic District	Glenn Springs Historic District	November 4, 1982 (#82001526)	South Carolina Highway 150 and Rich Hill Rd. 34°49′05″N 81°49′45″W	Glenn Springs	
42	Golightly-Dean House	Golightly-Dean House	September 29, 1988 (#88001845)	South Carolina Highway 56; 34°52′28″N 81°52′57″W	Spartanburg	
43	Augustus Belton and Margaret Wheeler Groce House		January 31, 2024 (#100009889)	110 Ridge Road; 34°57′04″N 82°07′14″W	Lyman	
44	Hampton Heights Historic District	Hampton Heights Historic District	January 27, 1983 (#83002208)	Roughly bounded by Spring, Henry, Hydrick, and Peronneau Sts., Hampton Dr., and both sides of Hampton Ave. 34°56′29″N 81°55′54″W	Spartanburg	
45	Hotel Oregon	Hotel Oregon	April 10, 2001 (#01000311)	247 and 249 Magnolia St. 34°57′10″N 81°56′11″W	Spartanburg	
46	Hurricane Tavern	Hurricane Tavern	July 19, 2001 (#01000755)	4101 South Carolina Highway 101; 34°48′04″N 82°07′25″W	Woodruff	
47	Inman Mills	Inman Mills	March 15, 2016 (#16000090)	240 4th St. 35°02′26″N 82°05′56″W	Inman	
48	Marysville School	Marysville School	January 9, 2007 (#06001231)	Sunny Acres Rd. 34°55′06″N 81°45′27″W	Pacolet	
49	McMakin's Tavern	McMakin's Tavern	October 9, 1974 (#74001876)	Northwest of Lyman off South Carolina Highway 358; 34°58′23″N 82°09′07″W	Lyman	
50	Montgomery Building	Montgomery Building	May 25, 2011 (#08000760)	187 N. Church St. 34°57′08″N 81°55′56″W	Spartanburg	Boundary decrease approved February 21, 2018
51	Walter Scott Montgomery House	Walter Scott Montgomery House	November 1, 1984 (#84000345)	314 S. Pine St. 34°56′50″N 81°54′59″W	Spartanburg	
52	Daniel Morgan Monument	Daniel Morgan Monument	September 22, 1980 (#80003711)	Main and Church Sts. 34°56′58″N 81°55′55″W	Spartanburg	
53	Mountain Shoals Plantation	Mountain Shoals Plantation	April 24, 1979 (#79002394)	Junction of U.S. Route 221 and South Carolina Highway 92; 34°39′09″N 81°57′50″W	Enoree	
54	New Hope Farm	New Hope Farm	May 20, 1999 (#98000558)	10088 Greenville Highway; 34°56′22″N 82°04′18″W	Wellford	
55	Nicholls-Crook House	Nicholls-Crook House	March 20, 1973 (#73001731)	15 miles southwest of Spartanburg off U.S. Route 221; 34°46′57″N 82°01′22″W	Spartanburg	
56	Pacolet Mill Office	Pacolet Mill Office	July 28, 2004 (#04000760)	180 Montgomery Ave. 34°55′14″N 81°44′30″W	Pacolet	
57	Pacolet Mills Cloth Room and Warehouse	Pacolet Mills Cloth Room and Warehouse	February 1, 2006 (#05001571)	1560 Sunny Acres Rd. 34°55′11″N 81°44′34″W	Pacolet	
58	Pacolet Mills Historic District	Pacolet Mills Historic District	November 16, 2007 (#07001207)	Roughly bounded by Brewster, Milliken, Walker, Montgomery, and Moore Sts. and Granite Ave. 34°55′07″N 81°44′26″W	Pacolet	
59	Palmetto Theater		April 12, 1996 (#96000405)	172 E. Main St. 34°57′01″N 81°55′47″W	Spartanburg	Demolished in 2003.
60	Pine Street Elementary School	Pine Street Elementary School	October 17, 2016 (#16000731)	500 S. Pine St. 34°56′37″N 81°54′41″W	Spartanburg	
61	Price's Post Office	Price's Post Office	October 28, 1969 (#69000174)	Southeast of Moore at the junction of County Roads 86, 199, and 200; 34°46′33″N 81°58′12″W	Moore	
62	Reidville Academy Faculty House	Reidville Academy Faculty House	September 4, 1997 (#97001105)	Junction of College and Main Sts. 34°51′37″N 82°06′52″W	Reidville	
63	Schuyler Apartments	Schuyler Apartments	May 12, 2014 (#14000208)	275 S. Church St. 34°56′42″N 81°55′46″W	Spartanburg	
64	Jammie Seay House	Jammie Seay House	October 7, 1971 (#71000807)	Darby Rd. off Crescent Ave. 34°55′49″N 81°56′30″W	Spartanburg	
65	Shiloh Methodist Church	Shiloh Methodist Church	February 2, 2005 (#04001591)	Blackstock Rd. 35°01′35″N 82°05′03″W	Inman	
66	Smith's Tavern	Smith's Tavern	July 23, 1974 (#74001878)	East of South Carolina Highway 49; 34°51′38″N 81°56′47″W	Roebuck	
67	Spartanburg Historic District	Spartanburg Historic District	May 19, 1983 (#83002209)	W. Main, Magnolia, Wall, Ezell, and Spring Sts.; also the 100 block of E. Main St. 34°56′58″N 81°55′59″W	Spartanburg	Second set of addresses represents a boundary increase of January 28, 2000
68	Startex Finishing Company	Startex Finishing Company	March 7, 2023 (#100008528)	21-23 North Main St. 34°55′43″N 82°05′53″W	Startex	
69	United States Post Office and Court House	United States Post Office and Court House	January 31, 2017 (#100000619)	201 Magnolia St. 34°57′06″N 81°56′04″W	Spartanburg	Now the Donald S. Russell Federal Building and United States Courthouse
70	Walker Hall	Walker Hall	December 6, 1977 (#77001232)	Southeast of Spartanburg on South Carolina Highway 56; 34°54′37″N 81°52′48″W	Spartanburg	
71	Walnut Grove Plantation	Walnut Grove Plantation	July 1, 1970 (#70000603)	8 miles southeast of Spartanburg, about 1 miles east of the junction of Interstate 26 and U.S. Route 921; 34°49′33″N 81°57′36″W	Spartanburg	
72	Williams Place	Williams Place	November 10, 1982 (#82001527)	Southwest of Glenn Springs on South Carolina Highway 113; 34°45′08″N 81°52′32″W	Glenn Springs	
73	Wofford College Historic District	Wofford College Historic District	December 27, 1974 (#74001879)	Wofford College campus 34°57′30″N 81°56′05″W	Spartanburg	
74	Woodruff High School	Woodruff High School	October 18, 2006 (#06000578)	239 E. Hayne St. 34°44′21″N 82°02′05″W	Woodruff	The current Woodruff High School uses a different building
75	Mary H. Wright Elementary School	Mary H. Wright Elementary School	August 3, 2007 (#07000798)	201 Caulder Ave. 34°56′03″N 81°55′35″W	Spartanburg	

== Former listings ==
	Name on the Register	Image	Date listed	Date removed	Location	City or town	Description
1	Bon Haven	Bon Haven	June 29, 1976 (#76001711)	February 27, 2020	728 N. Church St. 34°57′48″N 81°56′38″W	Spartanburg	Demolished on September 25, 2017.
2	Franklin Hotel	Franklin Hotel	July 28, 1983 (#83002207)	March 15, 2000	185 East Main Street; 34°56′03″N 81°55′35″W	Spartanburg	Imploded on September 25, 1988.
3	Fredonia		October 9, 1974 (#74001877)	January 27, 1981	U.S. Route 221; 34°56′03″N 81°55′35″W	Moore	Burned
4	Ingleside		October 15, 1973 (#73001729)	December 8, 2005	U.S. Route 176	Moore	Burned

== See also ==
- List of National Historic Landmarks in South Carolina
- National Register of Historic Places listings in South Carolina
