= Hope Farm =

Hope Farm or New Hope Farm may refer to:

In Australia

- Hope Farm, a large park within the Cattai National Park near Sydney, New South Wales

In Europe

- Hope Farm, Cambridgeshire, England, an arable farm belonging to the RSPB
- Hope Farm, Ellesmere Port, Cheshire, England

In the United States (by state)

- Hope Farm (Natchez, Mississippi), listed on the NRHP in Adams County, Mississippi
- Hope Farm (Millbrook, New York)
- Mount Hope Farm, Bristol, Rhode Island, NRHP-listed
- New Hope Farm (Wellford, South Carolina), listed on the NRHP in Spartanburg County, South Carolina
- New Hope Farm (Mission Hill, South Dakota), site of two NRHP-listed structures
  - New Hope Farm Polygonal Barn, Mission Hill, South Dakota, listed on the NRHP in Yankton County, South Dakota
  - New Hope Farm Swine Barn, Mission Hill, South Dakota, listed on the NRHP in Yankton County, South Dakota

Other

- Hope Farm (novel), a 2015 novel by Peggy Frew
