= Camp Hill =

Camp Hill may refer to:

== Australia ==
- Camp Hill, Queensland, a southern suburb of Brisbane
- Camp Hill, a prominent hill in Bendigo with public lookout over the CBD

== Canada ==
- Camp Hill (British Columbia), a cinder cone
- Camp Hill, Halifax, a hill in Nova Scotia
  - Camp Hill Cemetery, a cemetery within Halifax, Nova Scotia, Canada.

== United Kingdom ==
- Camp Hill, Birmingham, formerly Kempe Hill, a location in England
  - Battle of Camp Hill, also called the Battle of Birmingham (1643), a battle during the First English Civil War
  - King Edward VI Camp Hill School (disambiguation)
  - Camp Hill railway station, a series of disused former terminus, goods, and passenger stations near Camp Hill, Birmingham
  - Camp Hill line, a railway named for its original terminus in Camp Hill, Birmingham
- HM Prison Camp Hill, a former prison on the Isle of Wight
- Camp Hill, Nuneaton, Warwickshire

== United States ==
- Camp Hill, Alabama, a town
- Camp Hill, Pennsylvania, a borough
- Camp Hill, Montgomery County, Pennsylvania, an unincorporated community in Pennsylvania
- Camp Hill, Glenn Springs, South Carolina, a historic site
- Camp Hill (West Virginia), a hill
- Camp Hill in Washington, D.C., the location of the US Naval Observatory
- Camp Hill (Massachusetts), a military encampment in 1799–1800

== Other ==
- Camp Hill (Antarctica), small ice-free hill

== See also ==
- Camphill Movement
- Camp Prospect Hill
