= Zimmerman House (Glenn Springs, South Carolina) =

- U.S. National Register of Historic Places
- Location within South Carolina Location within the United States
- Location: 3701 Glenn Springs Road, Spartanburg County, South Carolina
- Coordinates: 34°48′55.6785″N 81°49′52.9572″W
- Built: 1854
- Architectural style: Neoclassical
- NRHP reference No.: 82001526
- Added to NRHP: November 4, 1982

The Zimmerman House is a historic home located in Glenn Springs Historic District at Glenn Springs, Spartanburg County, South Carolina, United States. The home was constructed from 1852 to 1854 as the plantation house of John Conrad Zimmerman, a local entrepreneur. The home consists of a two-story frame house in a U-shaped plan. On the west and north sides, there are two-tier porticos with stuccoed doric columns on each tier. There is also a brick wellhouse with stuccoed brick arches, and a barn with a granite cornerstone.
