= Hunsbury Hill =

Hill fort in Northamptonshire, England

Coordinates: 52.21889°N 0.92023°W

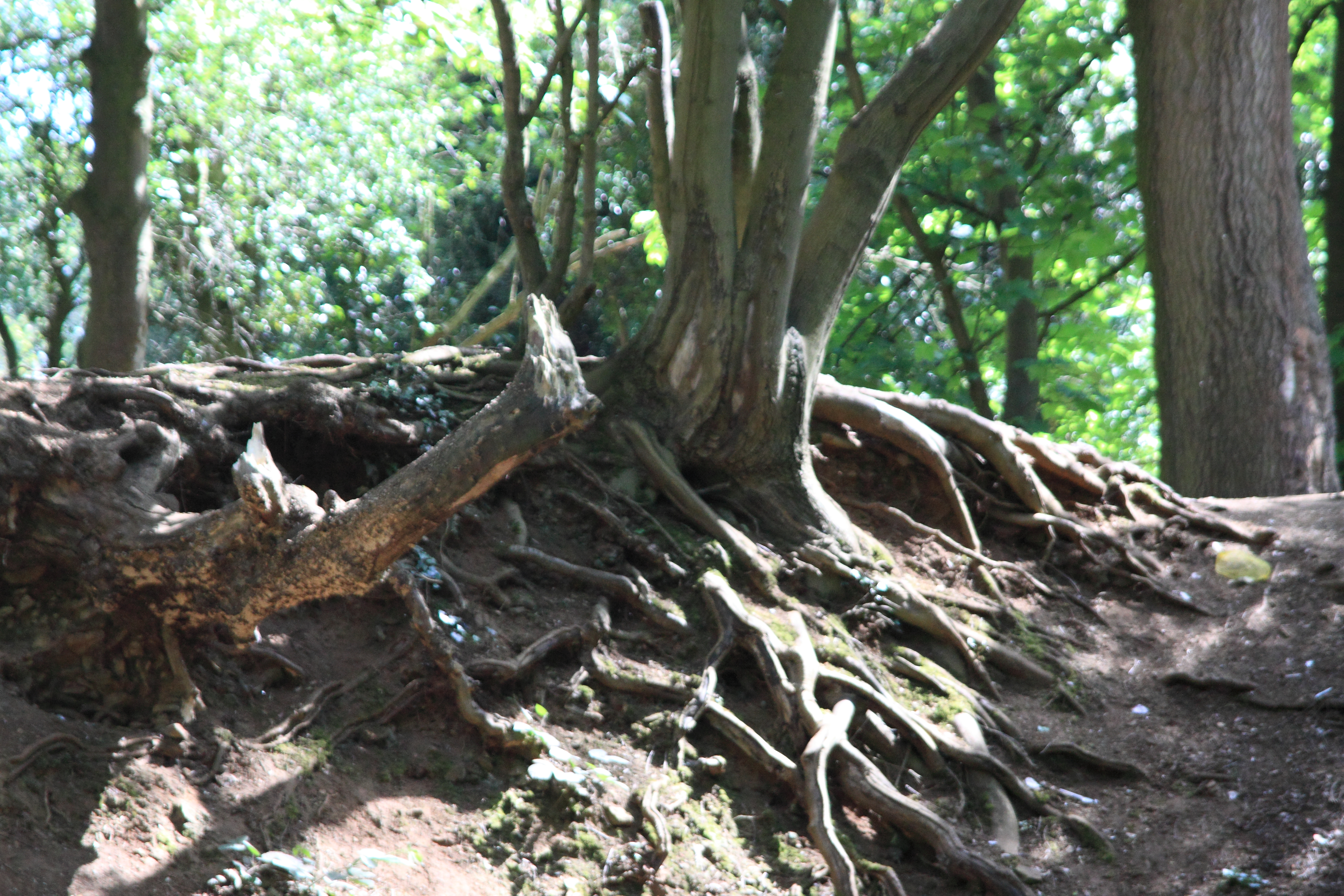
Exposed tree roots at the fort site

Hunsbury Hill is an Iron Age hill fort two miles (3 km) south-west of the centre of the town of Northampton in the county of Northamptonshire. It is also known as Danes Camp.

It is probable that defences were built at Hunsbury Hill between the 7th and 4th centuries BC. The deep ditch excavated has survived to the present day. A wooden rampart was also constructed; there is evidence that Hunsbury hill fort's inner ramparts were burned down and vitrified; this is rare in England.

Ironstone extraction began at the hill fort in about 1883, after an attempt to have the site protected under the Ancient Monuments Act of 1882 failed due to the cost of compensating the landowner. Many of the fort's internal features were destroyed, but the work revealed up to 300 pits which, according to the curator of Northampton Museum in 1887, contained "numerous artefacts that now comprise one of the finest collections ... of Prehistoric antiquities in England". The finds included iron weapons and tools, bronze brooches, pottery, glass and around 159 quern-stones. All were given to the town's museum.

Hunsbury Hill fort is a designated Scheduled Monument. Parts of the fort's banks have been badly eroded because of the 19th-century quarrying, the effects of burrowing rabbits and damage from tree roots. It is now managed as a park by West Northamptonshire Council.

Part of the route of the railway built for the quarrying remains and beginning in 1975 has been modified for use by the Northamptonshire Ironstone Railway Trust who added a new line. The track is used and maintained by the Trust. As the use of the quarries finished by 1920 the original metre gauge (3 ft 3^{3}/_{8} in) track was not used. The Trust laid a mixture of standard gauge, metre gauge and 2 ft (610 mm) track but from 1982 only standard gauge track has been used.

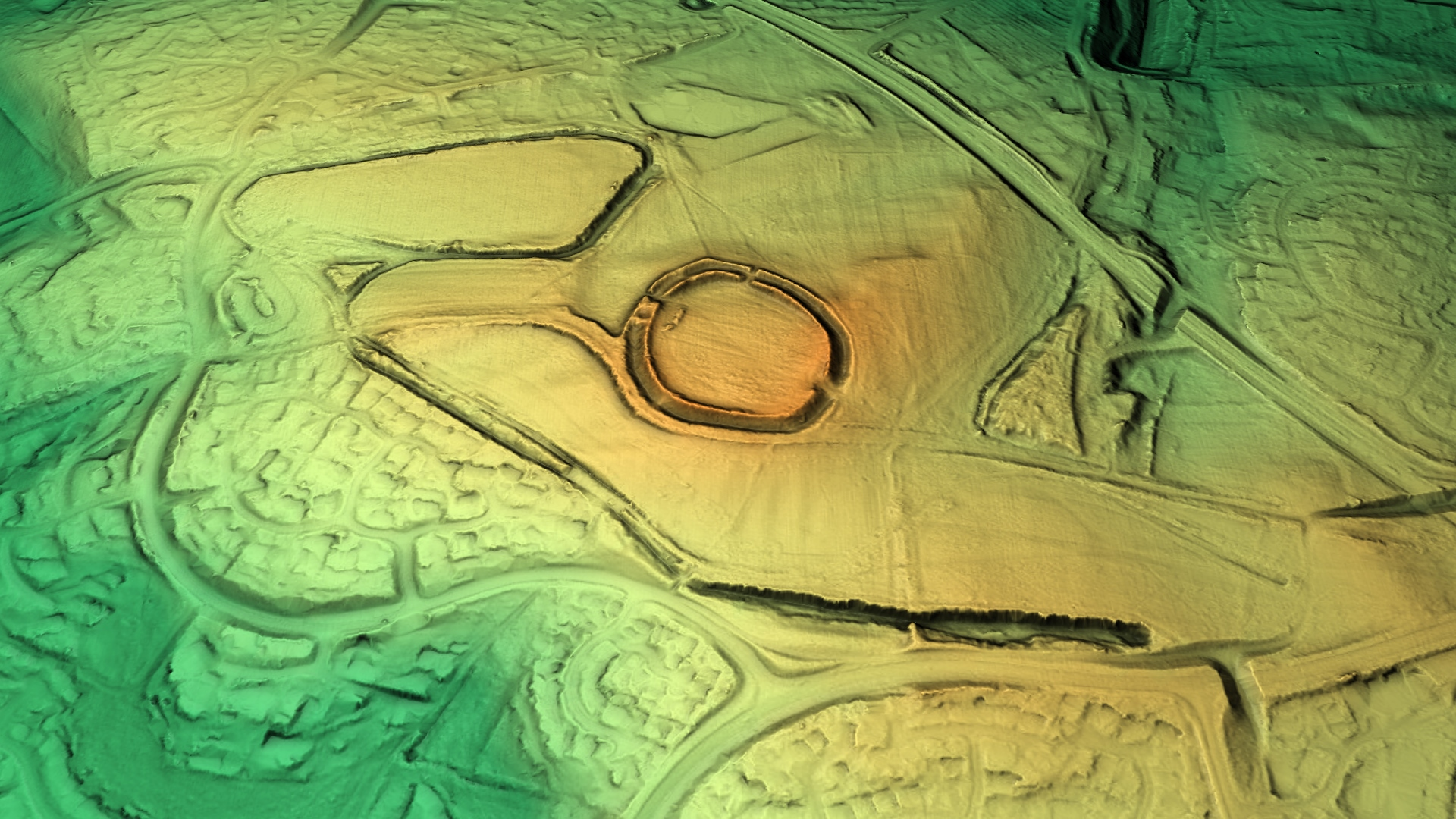
3D view of the digital terrain model

The area around the hill consists of the large Northampton housing developments, East Hunsbury, Camp Hill and West Hunsbury.
