= Julian P. Boyd =

American historian (1903–1980)

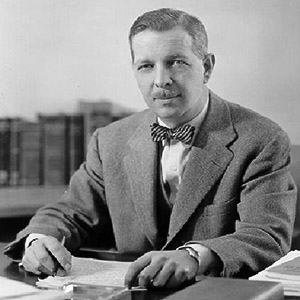
Julian Parks Boyd in 1939

Julian Parks Boyd (1903–28 May 1980) was an American professor who was professor of history at Princeton University. He served as president of the American Historical Association in 1964. For his efforts in preserving the site of the Battle of Hastings, he was appointed an honorary Commander of the Order of the British Empire.

== Life ==
Boyd was born at Converse Mill Village, Spartanburg County, South Carolina in 1903. He received a bachelor's degree in 1925 and a master's degree in 1926 from Duke University. He attended the University of Pennsylvania as a doctoral candidate but left without completing his work for a PhD. From 1928 to 1932, he worked for Pennsylvania's Wyoming Historical and Geological Society. From 1932 to 1934, he was director of the New York State Historical Association, and from 1934 to 1940, he worked for the Historical Society of Pennsylvania. He was Princeton University Librarian from 1940 to 1952. He joined the history department of Princeton University with the rank of professor in 1952. He edited The Papers of Thomas Jefferson from 1944 to his death. His approach has been influential:

Modern historical editing dates from the publication of Julian Boyd's first volume of The Papers of Thomas Jefferson in 1950. Although there had been earlier compilations of the papers of famous Americans, his carefully prepared texts of Jefferson's letters and other writings, "warts and all," set a new standard for accuracy and reliability.

Boyd was an elected member of both the American Philosophical Society and the American Academy of Arts and Sciences.

In 1966 Boyd led a committee to defend academic freedom after steel and coal heiress Helen Frick launched a libel suit in state court against Professor Sylvester Stevens. Stevens had written a history of Pennsylvania, and she claimed his book defamed her father. A number of professional historians under the auspices of the American Historical Association and the Organization of American Historians collected historical data on the robber barons of that time as well as that the early histories that lionized Henry Frick were ahistorical and inaccurate idolizing of him. Helen Frick’s suit failed when Judge Clinton R. Widener, in 1967, determined that even if it were possible to defame a dead person, the historians had correctly captured Henry Frick’s largess, maltreatment of workers, and political corruption.
