= Arcadia Mill No. 1 =

- U.S. National Register of Historic Places
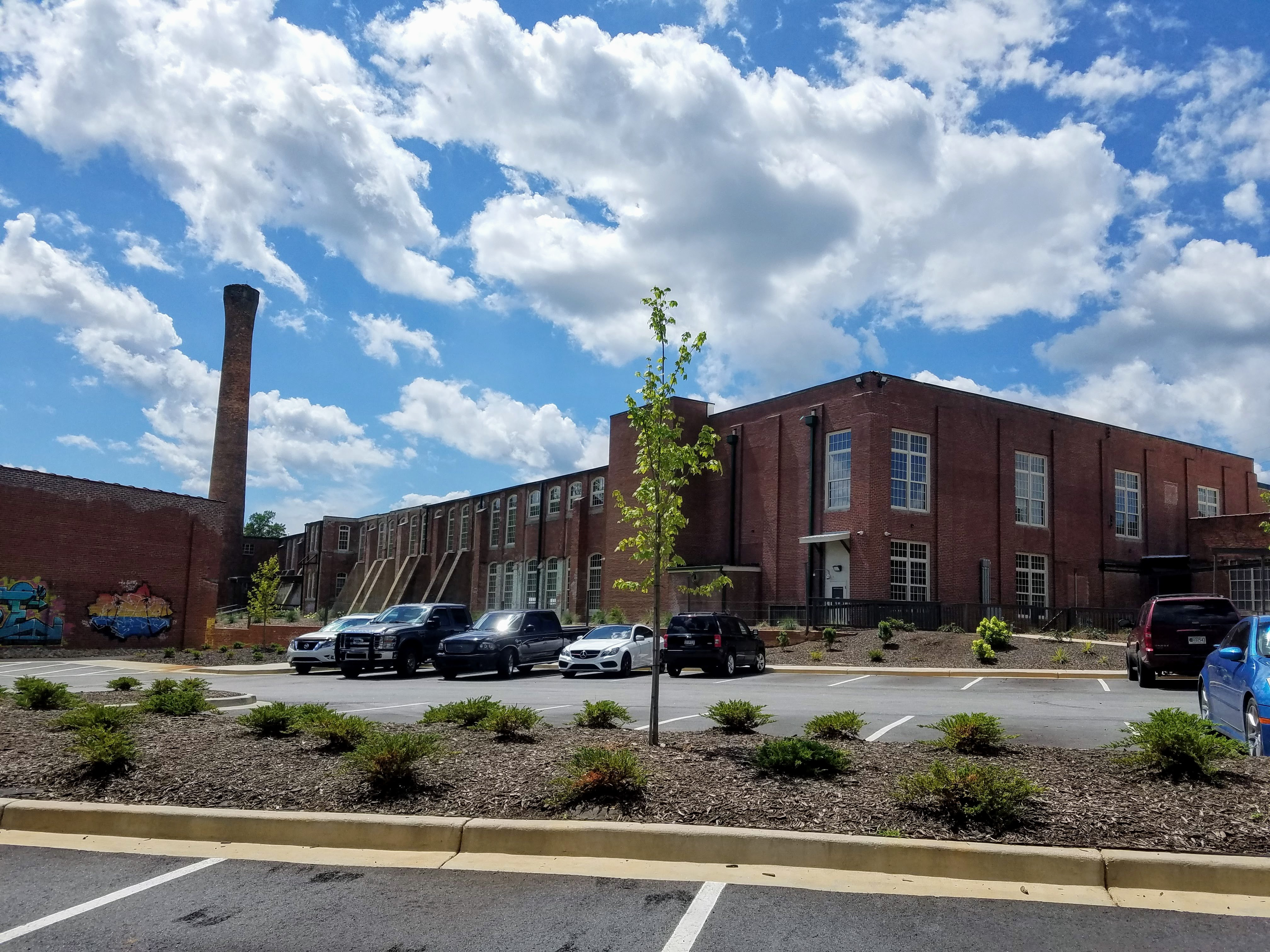

- Location within South Carolina Location within the United States
- Location: 1875 Hayne St., Spartanburg, South Carolina
- NRHP reference No.: 14000819
- Added to NRHP: September 30, 2014

Arcadia Mills No. 1, now the Arcadia Station Lofts, is a historic mill building at 1875 Hayne Street in Spartanburg, South Carolina. The mill was built in 1903 and enlarged in 1909, to designs by Greenville J.E. Sirrine. It is a well-preserved example of textile mill engineering from the early years of South Carolina's boom period in that industry.

The mill was listed on the National Register of Historic Places in 2014. It is now an apartment building.

== See also ==
- National Register of Historic Places listings in Spartanburg County, South Carolina
- Arcadia Mill No. 2 also in Spartanburg, South Carolina
