= Apalache Mill =

- U.S. National Register of Historic Places
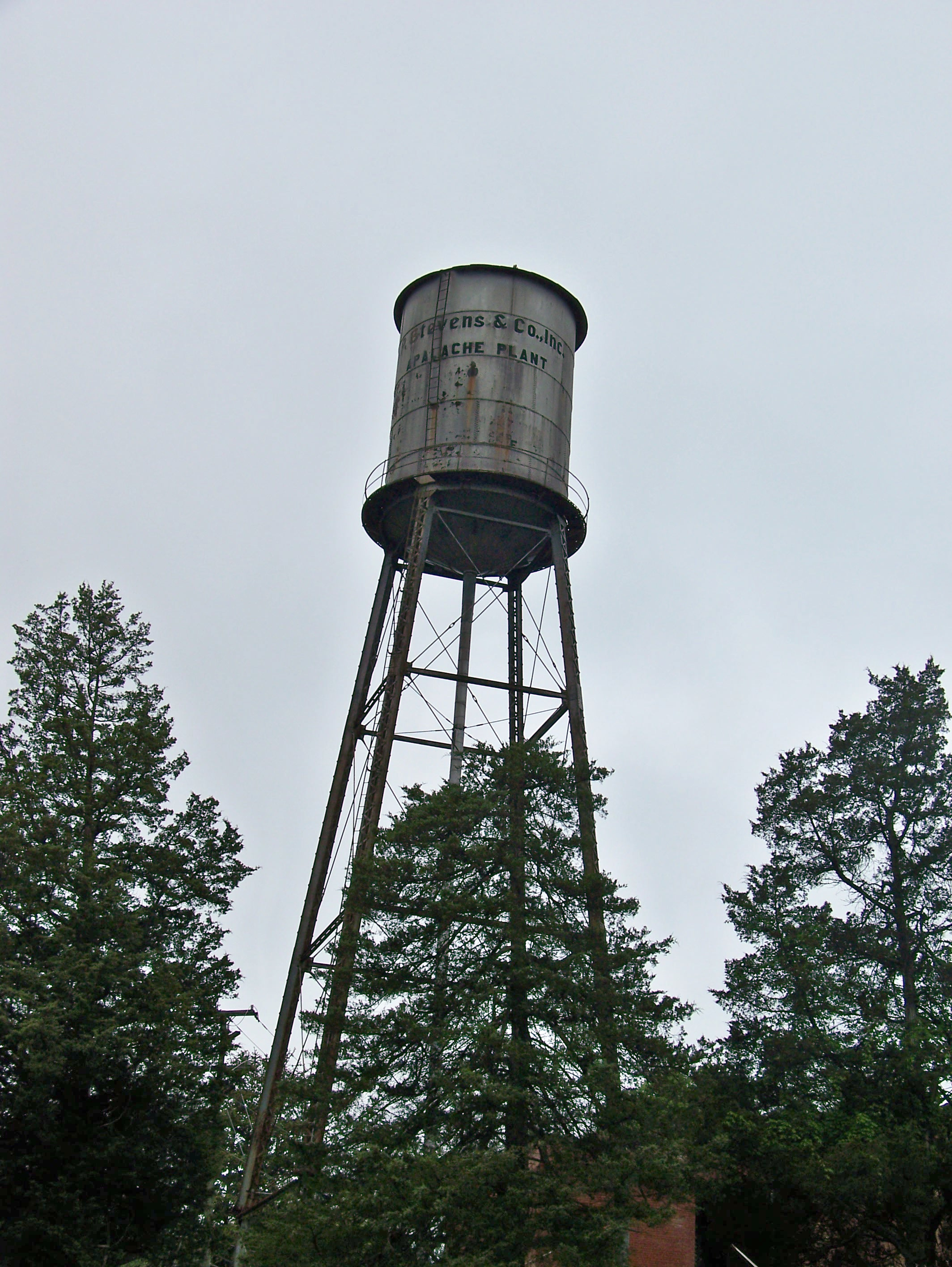

- Location within South Carolina Location within the United States
- Location: 2200 Racing Rd., Apalache, South Carolina
- Coordinates: 34°57′44″N 82°12′30″W
- NRHP reference No.: 15000616
- Added to NRHP: December 15, 2015

The Apalache Mill, now the Lofts by the Lake, is a historic textile mill at 2200 Racing Road in Apalache, South Carolina. The main mill building, a three-story brick building with plain late-19th century styling, sits at the southern end of Apalachee Lake, created by damming the Tyger River at a narrow gorge just to the east. Built in 1888, it is one of the first mills to be built in the Spartanburg area, and remained in active service until 2007.

The mill was listed on the National Register of Historic Places in 2015. The listing includes the mill and associated water power infrastructure, including a water tower and the lake.

== See also ==
- National Register of Historic Places listings in Spartanburg County, South Carolina
