= Apalache, South Carolina =

Settlement in South Carolina, United States

Coordinates: 34°57′40″N 82°12′43″W

Apalache is an unincorporated community in Spartanburg County, in the U.S. state of South Carolina.

== History ==
Using a variant spelling of the Apalachee Indian tribe, the community was named for its lofty elevation with view over the Appalachian Mountains. Variant names are "Apalachie Mills", "Appalachie", and "Arlington".

Apalache Mill was added to the National Register of Historic Places in 2015.
