= Katherine Grafton Miller =

American cultural tourism pioneer and preservationist (1894 – 1983)

- Miller in c. 1938
- Born: July 30, 1894; Natchez, Mississippi
- Died: March 31, 1983
- Resting place: Natchez City Cemetery, Adams County, Mississippi
- Occupation: Civil activist
- Spouse: Joseph Balfour Miller (b. 1892 – d. 1985)

Katherine Grafton Miller (July 30, 1894 – March 31, 1983) is credited as the founder of the Natchez Pilgrimage during the depression era of the 1930s. The six-day spring pilgrimage proved to be an economic stimulus for Mississippi by offering paying visitors romanticized versions of plantation life, including tours within privately-owned antebellum mansions which were concentrated in Natchez, Mississippi.

== Early life ==
Katherine Elizabeth Grafton was born July 30, 1894 to Mr. and Mrs. Kirby Grafton in Natchez. She married Joseph Balfour Miller in June 1917 at the Natchez Trinity Episcopal Church. The couple resided at Hope Farm in Natchez.

== Natchez Pilgrimage ==
As a member of the Natchez Garden Club, Katherine Grafton Miller is credited as founder and organizer of the Natchez Pilgrimage which was first held in the spring of 1932. Miller coordinated with owners of antebellum homes in Natchez and obtained their authorization for tours of the city's pre-Civil War mansions and the gardens that surrounded them. The tours were part of a 6-day pilgrimage, where a nominal fee was charged, with the Natchez Garden Club retaining 65% of any profits and 35% distributed to homeowners. Garden club profits were to be used for restoring historic landmarks in the city. Timing of the event was selected to coincide with the blooming of garden shrubbery and other flowering plants – e.g., azaleas (Rhododendron), camellias (Camellia japonica), jasmine (Jasminum), and Wisteria.

The 1932 pilgrimage proved to be an economic windfall for Natchez in spite of a depression-era economy. Visitors from 37 states in the US attended the first pilgrimage, and the event spurred state-wide interest in the preservation of Mississippi's historical architecture.

Following the success of the 1932 pilgrimage, Miller conducted promotional tours, visiting seventy cities throughout the United States to present lectures using colored lantern slides to generate national interest in visiting the antebellum homes and gardens that Natchez had to offer. To reach a larger audience, Miller also spread promotional information by way of newspapers, radio, and magazines.

In addition to tours of antebellum homes, the pilgrimage offered stories that incorporated idealized versions of plantation life presented by hostesses wearing antebellum-period costumes – antique silk hoop dresses, bonnets, and ribbons. During those early years, enslavement was portrayed as "…a benign, paternalistic institution".

Over time, the original 6-day event increased to several weeks and an autumn pilgrimage was added. The success of the Natchez Pilgrimage resulted in the Mississippi tourism board promoting similar events throughout the state for several decades during the mid-20th century.

== Legacy ==
In 1938, Miller authored the book, Natchez of Long Ago and the Pilgrimage, in which she described the inception and evolution of the Natchez Pilgrimage.

Katherine Grafton Miller died on March 31, 1983 in Natchez. She was inducted into the Mississippi Hall of Fame to honor her significant contributions to the state. Her portrait is on display in Mississippi's Old Capitol Museum in Jackson.

In 2025, after more than 90 years, the Natchez Pilgrimage tours founded by Katherine Miller were still active and were presented each year in spring (March – April) and autumn (September – October).
