= James M. Davis House =

Historic house in South Carolina, United States

- U.S. National Register of Historic Places
- U.S. Historic district
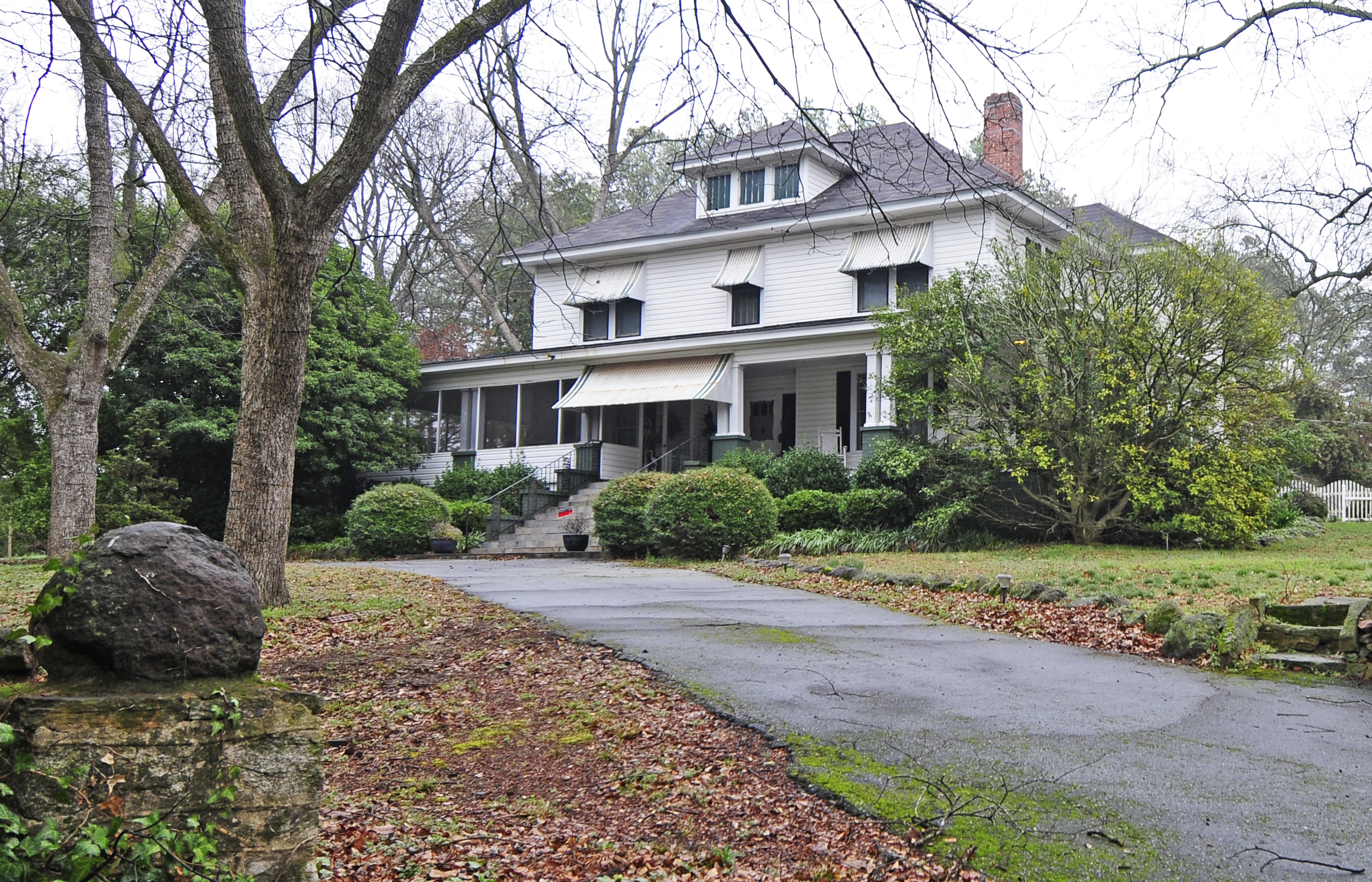
- James M. Davis House, February 2012

- Location within South Carolina Location within the United States
- Location: 2763 Old Hwy 14 S, Pelham, South Carolina
- Coordinates: 34°51′43″N 82°13′27″W
- Area: 1.5 acres (0.61 ha)
- Built: 1915
- Architectural style: American Foursquare
- NRHP reference No.: 10000317
- Added to NRHP: June 7, 2010

James M. Davis House is a historic house and national historic district located at Pelham, Spartanburg County, South Carolina.

== Description and history ==
It was built in 1915, and is a large two-story, wood-frame, central hall modified American Foursquare dwelling. It features a pyramidal roof with wide overhanging eaves and a one-story, full-width wraparound porch. The property includes a landscaped yard with a stacked stone wall. The house is associated with prominent local merchant and community leader James Marvin Davis, who operated Davis Mercantile from 1905 until his death in 1943. The general store was torn down in 2007.

It was listed on the National Register of Historic Places on June 7, 2010.
