= Arcadia Mill No. 2 =

- U.S. National Register of Historic Places
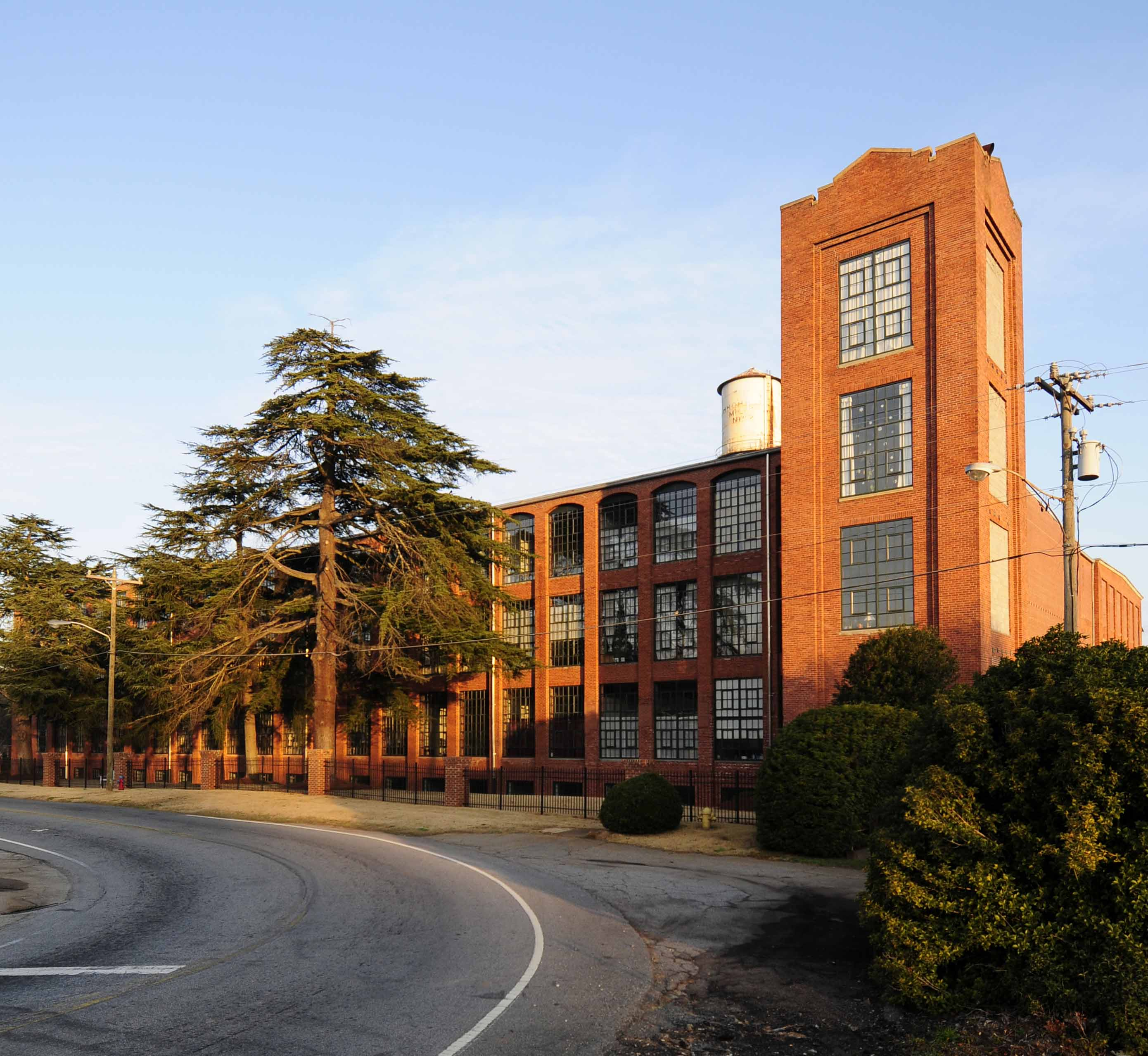

- Location within South Carolina Location within the United States
- Location: 100 W. Cleveland St., Spartanburg, South Carolina
- Coordinates: 34.95717°N 81.99765°W
- Area: 19.3 acres (7.8 ha)
- Architectural style: Late 19th And 20th Century Revivals
- NRHP reference No.: 05001158
- Added to NRHP: October 4, 2005

Arcadia Mills No. 2, now the Mayfair Lofts, is a historic mill building at 100 W. Cleveland St., Spartanburg, South Carolina. It was listed on the National Register of Historic Places in 2005.

== History ==
The mill was the built by Spartanburg banker and pharmacist, Dr. Henry Arthur Ligon, Sr., in 1922. It opened in 1923. It was the second mill of Arcadia Mills. The mills had an adjacent mill village of Arcadia, which had about 300 houses for the mill workers.

During the Depression, the mill tried to increase production through a variety of methods such as increased hours and quickening the pace of the work. In 1932, the United Textile Workers of America (UTWA) called a strike, but it failed. The workers did not participate in a nationwide UTWA strike in 1934.

The mill was sold to a new company, Mayfair Mills, headed by a New York cotton agent, Joshua L. Baily and Company. Arcadia No. 2 was called Baily Mill or Mayfair-Baily Mill. Frederick B. Dent became president of Mayfair Mills in 1947. In 2001, Mayfair Mills went into bankruptcy.

The mill building is currently the Mayfair Lofts apartments.

== See also ==
- National Register of Historic Places listings in Spartanburg County, South Carolina
- Arcadia Mill No. 1 also in Spartanburg, South Carolina
