= Schuyler Apartments =

- U.S. National Register of Historic Places
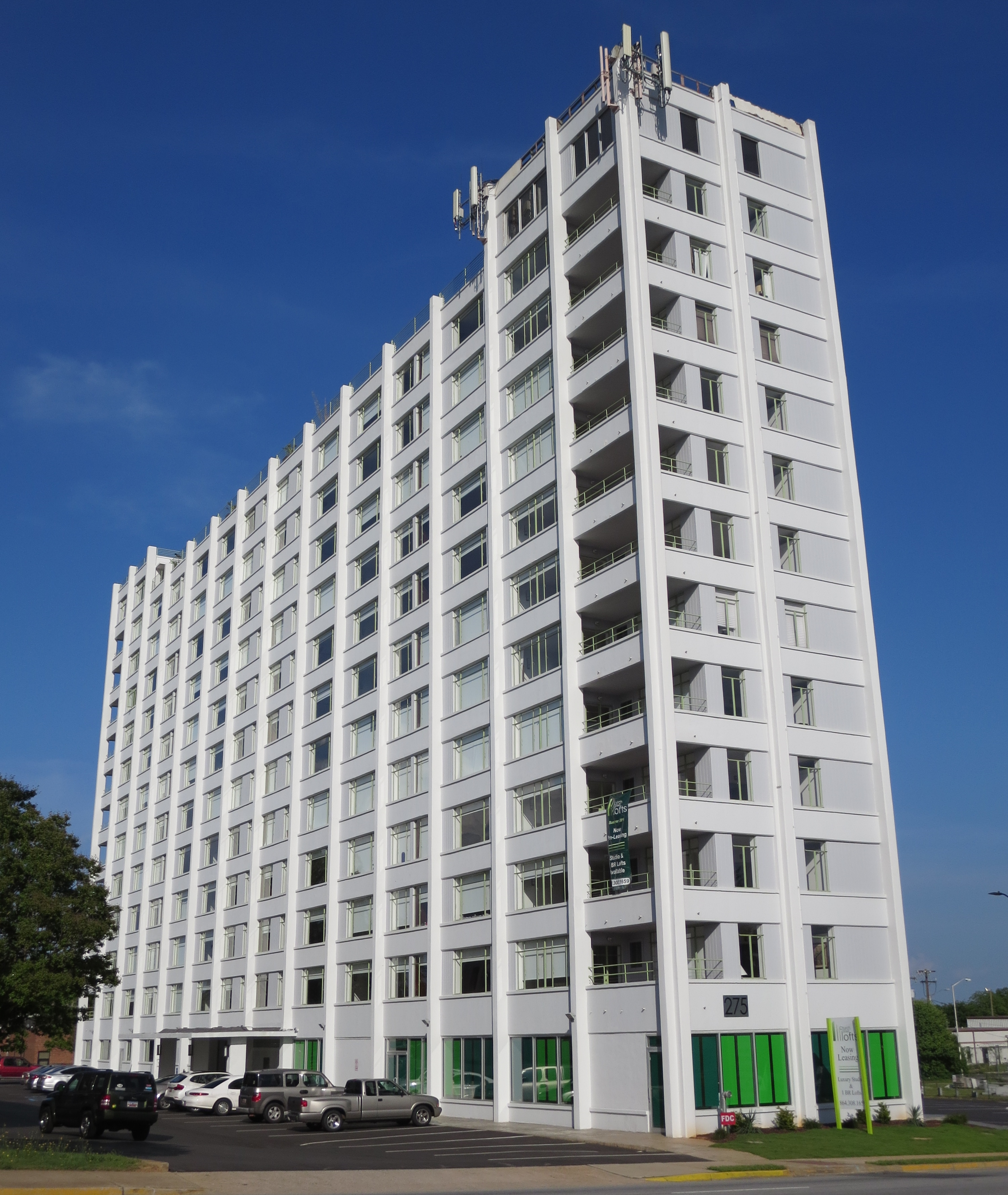

- Location within South Carolina Location within the United States
- Location: 275 S. Church St., Spartanburg, South Carolina
- Coordinates: 34°56′42″N 81°55′46″W
- Area: less than one acre
- Built: 1950
- Architect: David W. Cecil
- Architectural style: International
- NRHP reference No.: 14000208
- Added to NRHP: May 12, 2014

The Schuyler Apartments are a historic apartment building at 275 South Church Street in Spartanburg, South Carolina. The 13-story concrete, glass, and steel structure was designed by David W. Cecil (1921-2011) and built in 1950. The International style structure, with clean and simple lines, is a fine representative example of post-World War II construction in Spartanburg. Cecil also is known locally for the design of Spartanburg City Hall and the main branch of the Spartanburg Post Office, all three of which were for years considered eyesores. The Schuyler building has found itself placed on the National Historical Register recently in time for the grand reopening of the building. The building formerly housed subsidized families: low-income and elderly residents. Of late it has been refurbished as 'upscale' studios and one bedroom units.

The building was listed on the National Register of Historic Places in 2014.

== See also ==
- National Register of Historic Places listings in Spartanburg County, South Carolina
