= Inman Mills (Inman, South Carolina) =

- U.S. National Register of Historic Places
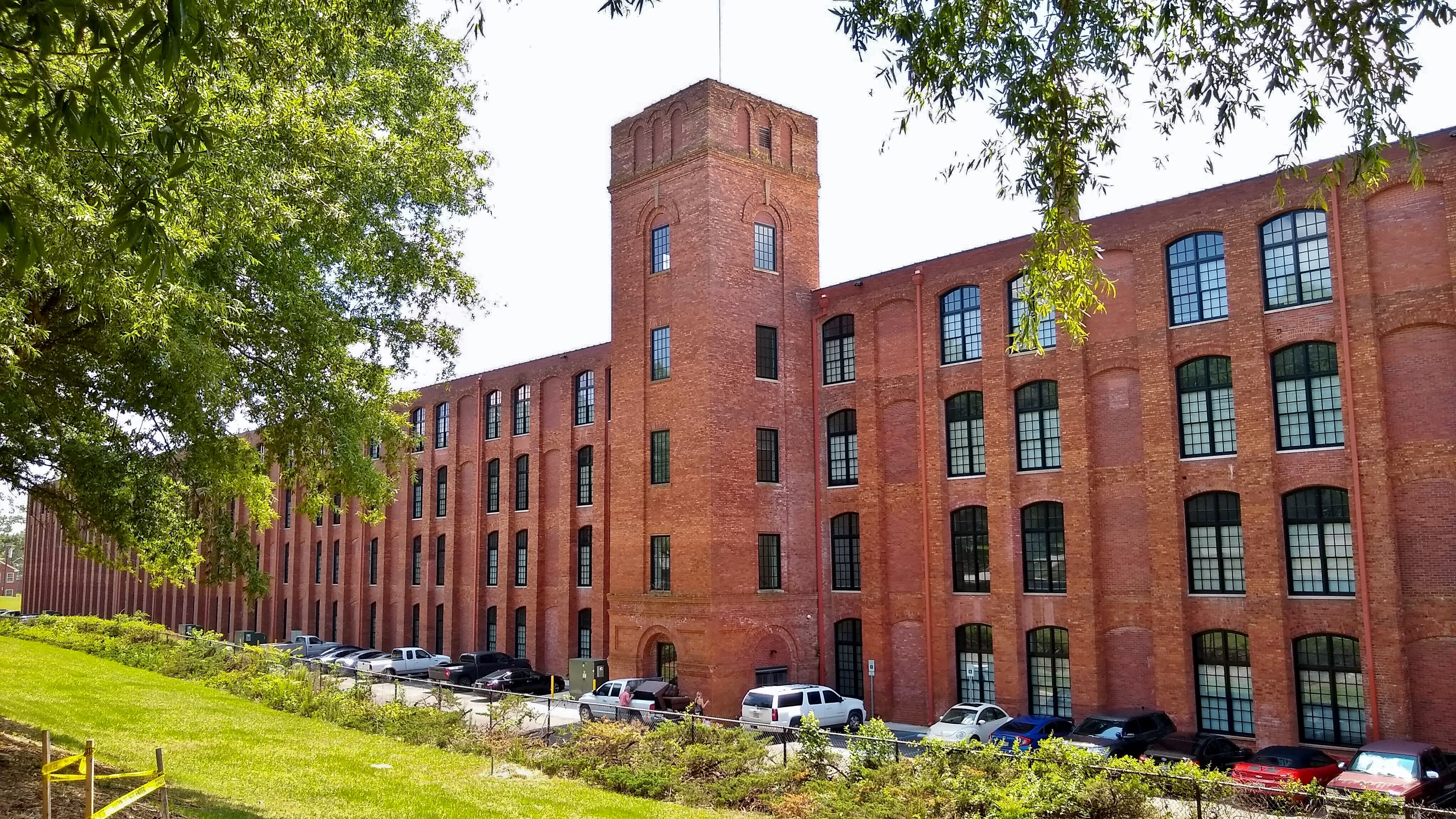
- Renovated Inman Mill in June 2019

- Location within South Carolina Location within the United States
- Location: 240 4th St., Inman, South Carolina
- Coordinates: 35°2′26″N 82°5′56″W
- Area: 19.5 acres (7.9 ha)
- Built: 1902
- Architect: W.B. Smith Whaley
- Architectural style: Romanesque Revival
- NRHP reference No.: 16000090
- Added to NRHP: March 15, 2016

The Inman Mills, now the Lofts at Inman Mills, are a historic textile mill complex at 240 4th Street in Inman, South Carolina. The mill complex includes a large main mill building and a number of smaller buildings, some attached, as well as a smokestack. The main building is a large rectangular four-story brick building with largely bricked-over segmented-arch window bays, and a five-story central tower. The mill was built in 1902 for the Chapman family, and was designed by the prominent regional mill architect W.B. Smith Whaley. The mill was closed in 2001, and was for many years one of the city's major employers.

The mills were listed on the National Register of Historic Places in 2016.

== See also ==
- National Register of Historic Places listings in Spartanburg County, South Carolina
