= Anderson's Mill =

- U.S. National Register of Historic Places
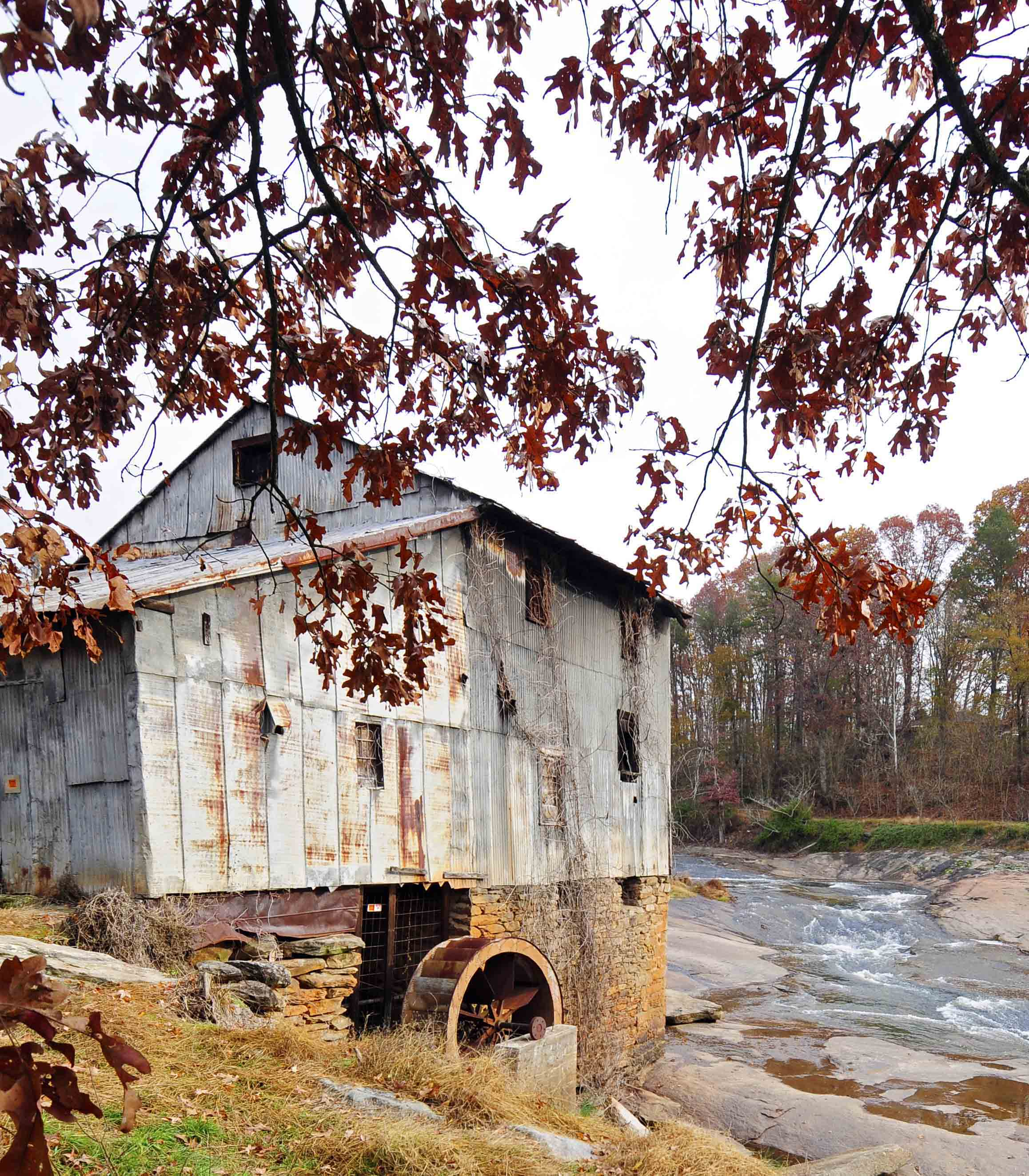

- Location within South Carolina Location within the United States
- Nearest city: Spartanburg, South Carolina
- Coordinates: 34°52′59″N 82°0′42″W
- Area: 5 acres (2.0 ha)
- Built: 1900
- NRHP reference No.: 78002529
- Added to NRHP: November 14, 1978

For the mill of the same name see Anderson's Mill, Smeaton

Anderson's Mill is a historic water-powered gristmill on the North Tyger River near Fairmont in Spartanburg County, South Carolina. Located at the intersection of the North Tyger River and Anderson Mill Road in Spartanburg County, about 8 miles southwest of the town square in Spartanburg, Anderson Mill was formerly known as Nicholl’s Fort, Nicholl’s Mill and Tanner’s Mill. The mill gets its current name from James “Tyger Jim" Anderson who acquired the mill in 1831. The site of the establishment of Spartanburg County in a court held in the Spartanburg District on the third Monday in June 1785. The mill is important to Spartanburg's local history.

Anderson Mill is located adjacent to a set of rapids with significant drop and is supplied by a millpond created by a diversion wall with a stone and wooden flume leading to the waterwheel.

The original facility is believed to have been built about the time of the American Revolution. There was a major rebuilding process after the mill was heavily damaged by floods in the early 1900's. The Mill is the oldest mill in South Carolina still standing on its original foundation. It was last operated commercially in 1975 by A. A. Sellars. Anderson Mill (Anderson’s Mill). The mill was listed in the National Register in November 1978.

The Tyger River Foundation began exploring the possibility of restoring the mill in 2005 and has maintained the site since then. The adjacent Riveredge Homeowners Association donated the Mill to The Tyger River Foundation in 2010.

== Origins ==
Most of the mill structure and machinery were constructed in the late nineteenth or early twentieth century, but the mill's foundation dates back to the eighteenth century. The building has a basement, main floor, and attic, with a low gable roof and irregularly placed windows. The mill sits on the west bank of the river, with the 12 foot metal water wheel driven by water from a lock and canal. Milling operations ceased in 1975.
