= Converse Heights Historic District =

Historic district in South Carolina, United States

- U.S. National Register of Historic Places
- U.S. Historic district
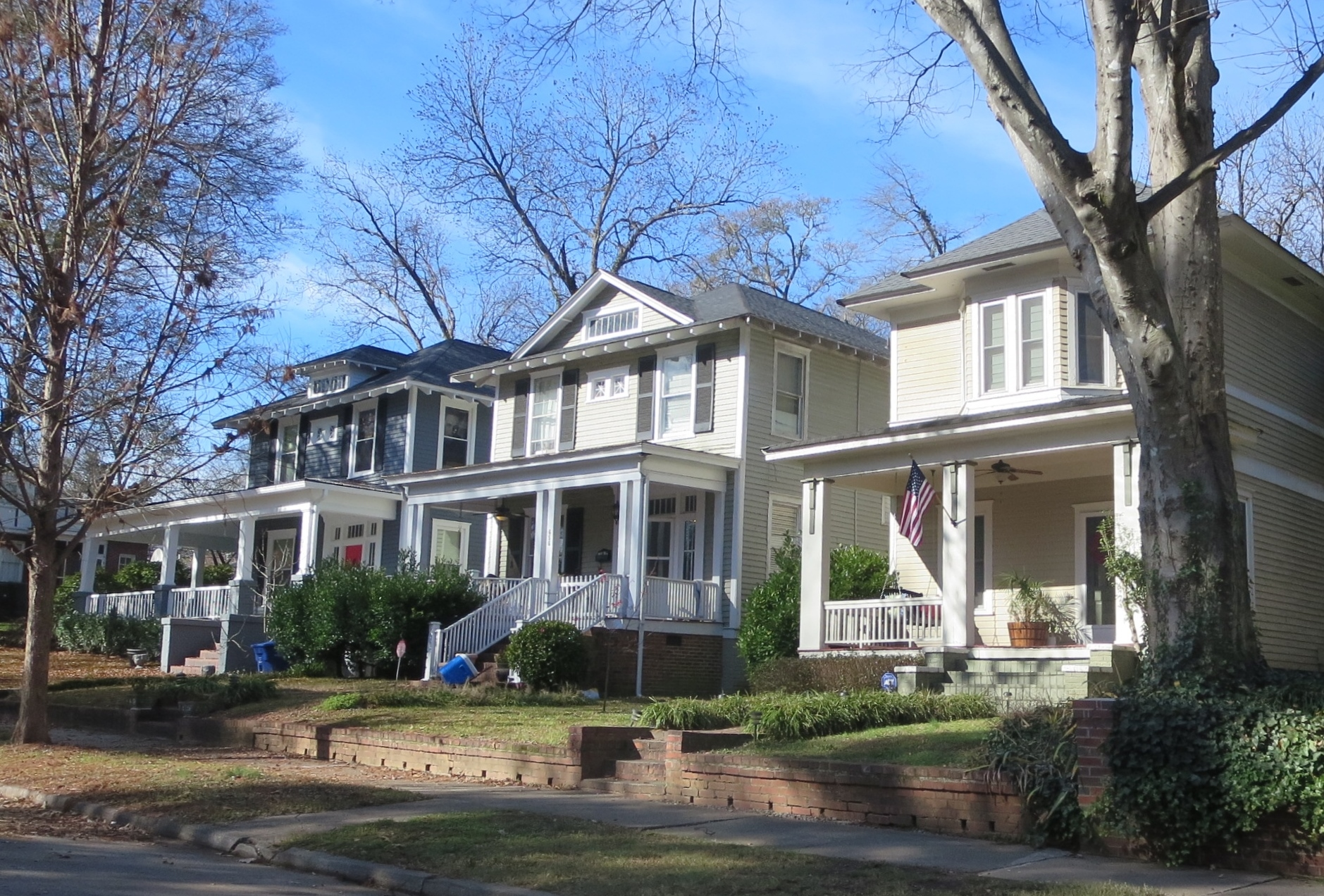
- Maple Street houses in the Converse Heights Historic District, December 2015

- Location within South Carolina Location within the United States
- Location: Roughly parts of Clifton, Connecticut, Glendalyn, Hale, Maple, Mills, Norwood, Otis, Palmetto, Plume, Poplar, Rutledge,, Spartanburg, South Carolina
- Coordinates: 34°57′05″N 81°54′32″W
- Area: 688 acres (278 ha)
- Built: 1906
- Architectural style: Late 19th And 20th Century Revivals, Bungalow/craftsman
- NRHP reference No.: 07001021
- Added to NRHP: September 25, 2007

Converse Heights Historic District is a national historic district located at Spartanburg, Spartanburg County, South Carolina. It encompasses 460 contributing buildings in a residential section of Spartanburg. The district documents the prevalent housing types for middle and upper class citizens from about 1900 to 1940. It includes residences representative of the Queen Anne, American Foursquare, American Craftsman, Spanish Mission, Tudor, Colonial Revival, and Neo-Classical styles.

It was listed on the National Register of Historic Places in 2007.
