= Palmetto Theater =

- U.S. National Register of Historic Places
- Location within South Carolina Location within the United States
- Location: 172 E. Main St., Spartanburg, South Carolina
- Coordinates: 34°57′1″N 81°55′47″W
- Area: less than one acre
- Built: 1940-1941
- Architect: Stillwell, Erle G.
- Architectural style: Art Deco
- NRHP reference No.: 96000405
- Added to NRHP: April 12, 1996

Palmetto Theater was a historic movie theater located at Spartanburg, Spartanburg County, South Carolina. It was built in 1940–1941, and was a one-story, rectangular plan brick building. It featured a large marquee and a separate shop storefront decorated in blue Carrera-glass panels. The interior featured double balconies, Terrazzo flooring, large Art Deco light fixtures, decorative wall painting, and a plaster Art Deco screen surround.

It was listed on the National Register of Historic Places in 1996. It has since been demolished.
