= Hope Farm (Natchez, Mississippi) =

Historic house in Mississippi, United States

- U.S. National Register of Historic Places
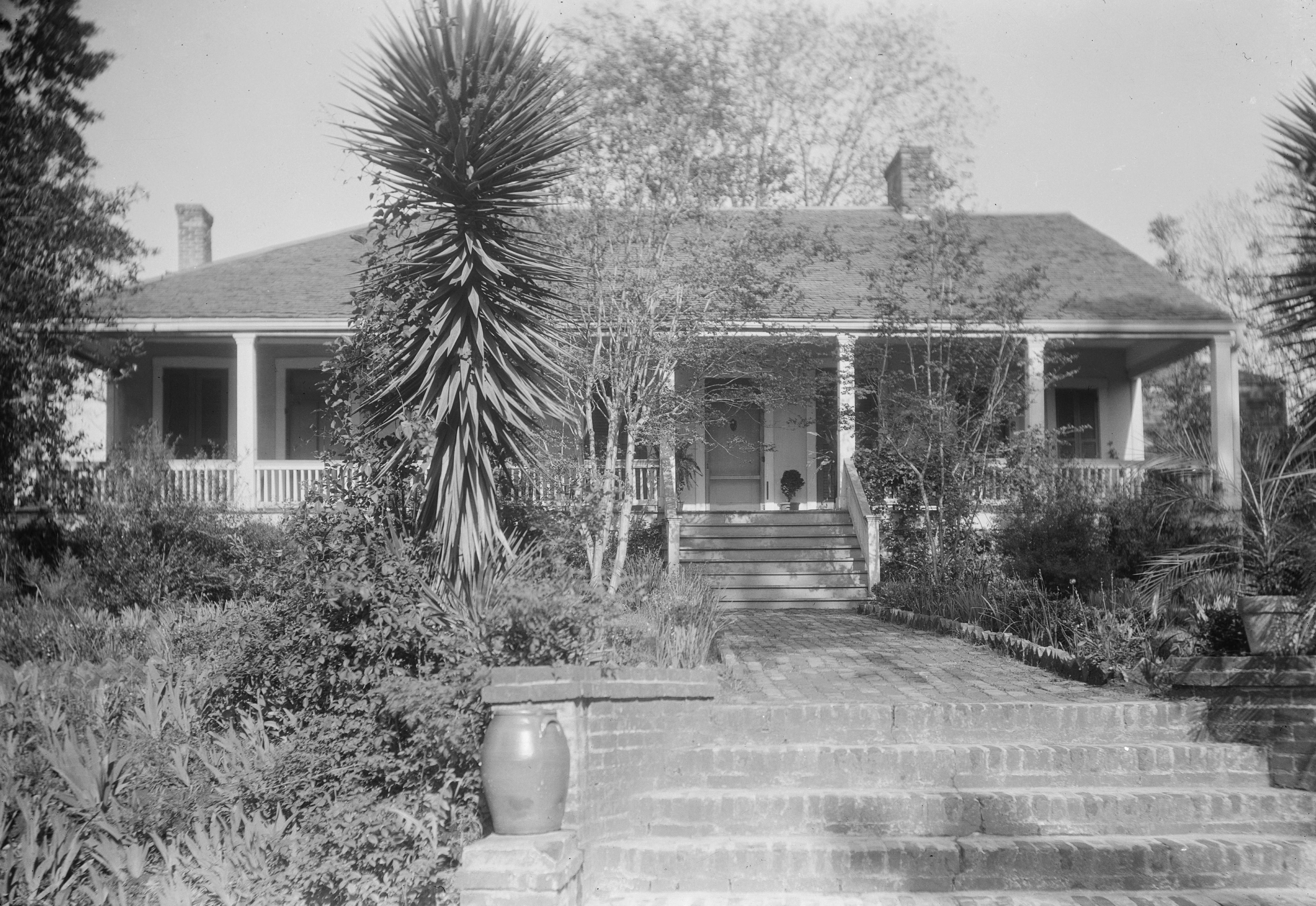

- Location within Mississippi Location within the United States
- Location: 147 Homochitto Street, Natchez, Mississippi
- Area: 10 acres (4.0 ha)
- Built: 1792
- Architectural style: Greek Revival, Colonial, Spanish Colonial
- NRHP reference No.: 75001037
- Added to NRHP: August 22, 1975

Hope Farm is a historic house in Natchez, Mississippi, USA.

== History ==
The house was built by Carlos de Grand Pré from 1780 to 1792. Simple Spanish provincial architecture. Mary Routh Ellis (of the Routh family) sold the farm to Eli Montgomery in 1833, and for 90 years it remained in the Montgomery family.

Spain and England met here. Hope Farm, charming in its simplicity, had a section built in 1775, when the English owned the Natchez area. Then, in 1790, the Spanish Governor Carlos de Grand Pré added the gallery with its ornamented, sturdy columns. The building shows a merger of two different elements of building, and of two varying cultures.

In 1926, it was purchased by J. Balfour Miller and his wife, Katherine Grafton Miller, who founded the Natchez Pilgrimage and promoted Natchez as the epitome of the Old South.

After Katherine Miller's death in 1983, the home and all of its furnishings were purchased by Ethel Green Banta, a Natchez native and the daughter of a close friend of Millers. For 35 years, Banta ensured the home remained a central part of the Natchez Pilgrimage until she retired in 2018. In March 2023, a fire broke out at Hope Farm that claimed the life of Ethel Banta and caused extensive damage throughout the home. The cause of the fire is unknown.

== Heritage significance ==
The house has been listed on the National Register of Historic Places since August 22, 1975.
