= Foster's Tavern =

Historic house in South Carolina, United States

- U.S. National Register of Historic Places
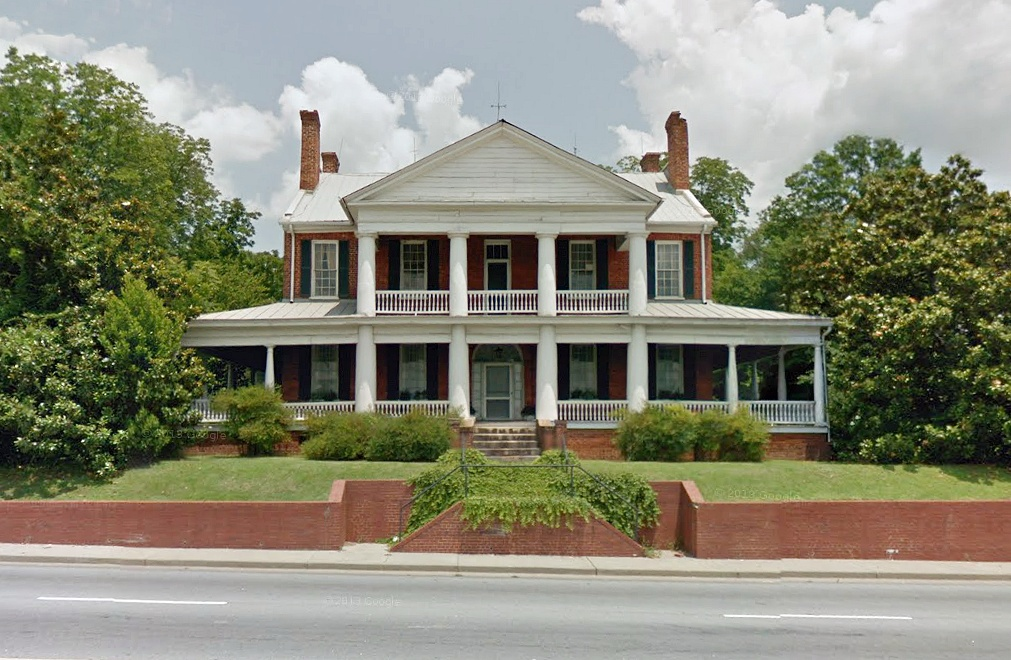
- Foster’s Tavern in June 2012

- Location within South Carolina Location within the United States
- Location: 191 Cedar Spring Rd., Spartanburg, South Carolina
- Coordinates: 34°55′18″N 81°53′14″W
- Area: 2 acres (0.81 ha)
- Built: 1808
- NRHP reference No.: 70000602
- Added to NRHP: December 18, 1970

Foster's Tavern is an upcountry 19th century historic landmark building in Spartanburg County, South Carolina, United States, located at 191 Cedar Springs Road at the intersection of the old Pickneyville and Georgia roads (highways 56 and 295). As of May 2010, it was in private ownership. It is believed to be the oldest brick house in Spartanburg South Carolina, and was listed on the National Register of Historic Places on December 18, 1970.

== History ==
Foster's Tavern was built by Anthony Foster, with construction beginning in 1801 and taking seven years or more to complete. The house is made from locally manufactured bricks, and features tied chimneys (separate chimneys joined by a wall or facade) at each end of a gable roof, hand carved woodwork (including bowed mantels and stair scrollwork), blown-glass windowpanes, soapstone hearths, cattle-hair plaster and original shutter pintles. The portico with its fanlight was added in 1845, and the porches in about 1915.

Foster's Tavern housed John C. Calhoun and Bishop Asbury on their travels through the area; the southeast corner room on the second floor came to be called the John C. Calhoun Room. Guests staying in it always vacated it when Calhoun came to stay.
