= Camp Hill, Glenn Springs, South Carolina =

- Camp Hill
- U.S. National Register of Historic Places
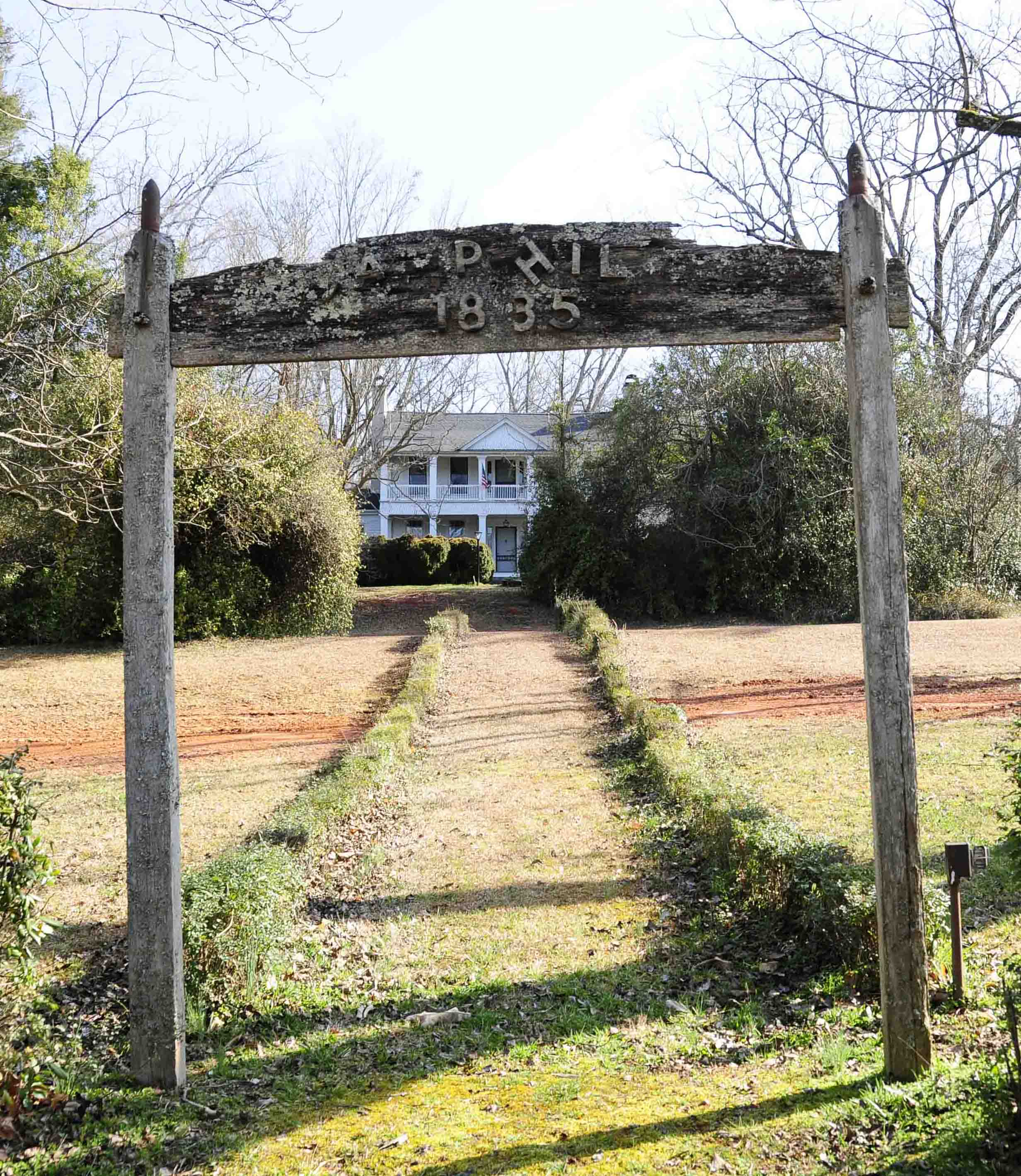
- Camp Hill, February 2012

- Location within South Carolina Location within the United States
- Location: South of Glenn Springs on South Carolina Highway 215, near Glenn Springs, South Carolina
- Coordinates: 34°47′22″N 81°48′59″W
- Area: 9 acres (3.6 ha)
- Built: 1835
- Architectural style: Greek Revival
- NRHP reference No.: 70000600
- Added to NRHP: July 6, 1970

Camp Hill, near Spartanburg, South Carolina, is the site of a plantation house built by Dr. John Winsmith in 1835. It was listed on the National Register of Historic Places in 1970.

It had originally been the camp site of British Major Patrick Ferguson prior to the Battle of Kings Mountain, October 17, 1780. This was an important Patriot victory in the Southern campaign of the American Revolutionary War. Frontier militia overwhelmed the Loyalist militia led by Major Ferguson. In The Winning of the West, Theodore Roosevelt wrote of Kings Mountain, "This brilliant victory marked the turning point of the American Revolution."
