= Camp Hill (West Virginia) =

Summit in Harpers Ferry, West Virginia, US

Coordinates: 39.3241478°N 77.7410574°W

Camp Hill is a summit in Harpers Ferry, West Virginia, in the United States. With an elevation of 538 feet (164 m), Camp Hill is the 952nd highest summit in the state of West Virginia.

Camp Hill was so named from the fact army men camped there in 1799.
