= Cleveland Law Range =

Historic building in South Carolina, US

- U.S. National Register of Historic Places
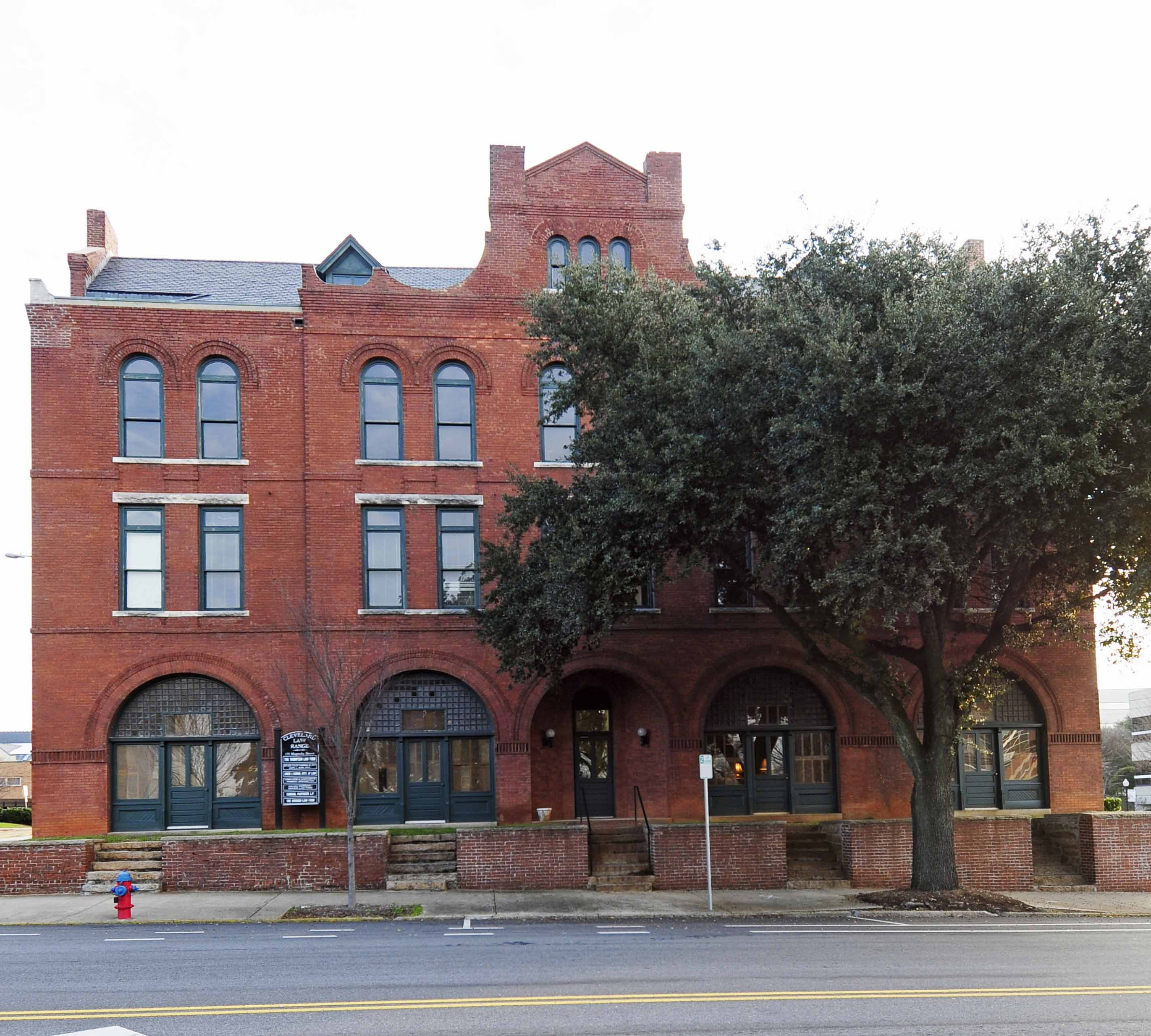
- Cleveland Law Range, February 2012

- Location within South Carolina Location within the United States
- Location: 171 Magnolia St., Spartanburg, South Carolina
- Coordinates: 34°57′3″N 81°56′4″W
- Area: 0.7 acres (0.28 ha)
- Built: 1898-1899
- Architectural style: Romanesque, Richardsonian Romanesque
- NRHP reference No.: 73001730
- Added to NRHP: April 13, 1973

Cleveland Law Range is a historic office building located at Spartanburg, Spartanburg County, South Carolina. It was built in 1898–1899, and is a three-story, Richardsonian Romanesque style brick building. It features five arched bays on the ground floor, with repeated bay arrangements on the second and third floors. Three South Carolina governors maintained offices in the Cleveland Law Range: James F. Byrnes, John Gary Evans, and Donald S. Russell.

It was listed on the National Register of Historic Places in 1973.
