= Williams Place =

- U.S. National Register of Historic Places
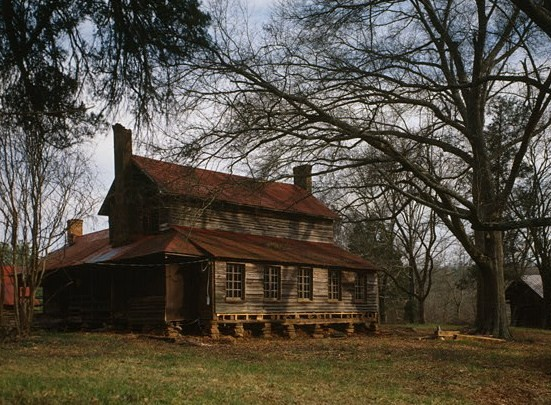
- Williams Place, Main House, HABS Photo, March 1987

- Location within South Carolina Location within the United States
- Location: Southwest of Glenn Springs on South Carolina Highway 113, near Glenn Springs, South Carolina
- Coordinates: 34°45′08″N 81°52′32″W
- Area: 39 acres (16 ha)
- Built: c. 1839-1850
- Architectural style: Log buildings
- NRHP reference No.: 82001527
- Added to NRHP: November 10, 1982

Williams Place is a historic home and farm complex located near Glenn Springs, Spartanburg County, South Carolina. It was developed between about 1839 and 1850, and includes 10 contributing buildings, 1 contributing site, and 2 contributing structures. The majority of the buildings are of log construction and include a small house, a large house, a kitchen, a smokehouse, a smithy, two corn cribs, a ruined house, and barn / stable. Frame buildings and structures include a privy and a barn. Also on the property are a well and an earthen dam.

It was listed on the National Register of Historic Places in 1982.
