= Wellford, South Carolina =

- City
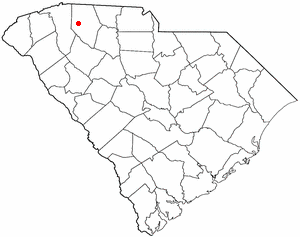
- Location of Wellford, South Carolina
- Coordinates: 34°57′34″N 82°05′40″W
- Country: United States
- State: South Carolina
- County: Spartanburg

Area
  - Total: 4.61 sq mi (11.93 km^{2})
  - Land: 4.58 sq mi (11.86 km^{2})
  - Water: 0.027 sq mi (0.07 km^{2})
- Elevation: 856 ft (261 m)

Population (2020)
  - Total: 3,293
  - Density: 719.4/sq mi (277.75/km^{2})
- Time zone: UTC-5 (Eastern (EST))
  - Summer (DST): UTC-4 (EDT)
- ZIP code: 29385
- Area codes: 864, 821
- FIPS code: 45-75580
- GNIS feature ID: 2405703
- Website: www.cityofwellford.com

Wellford is a city in Spartanburg County, South Carolina, United States. The population was 3,293 at the 2020 census, up from 2,378 in 2010.

== History ==
Wellford was founded in 1840 by a man named Wellington, who was building a railroad in the area. He settled and named the town Wellington. When the town was chartered on December 9, 1882, the name was changed to Wellford.

New Hope Farm was listed on the National Register of Historic Places in 1999.

== Geography ==
According to the United States Census Bureau, the city has a total area of 2.0 square miles (5.3 km^{2}), all land.

== Demographics ==
Historical population
Census	Pop.	Note	%±
1880	302		—
1900	346		—
1910	370		6.9%
1920	180		−51.4%
1930	400		122.2%
1940	454		13.5%
1950	721		58.8%
1960	1,040		44.2%
1970	1,298		24.8%
1980	2,143		65.1%
1990	2,511		17.2%
2000	2,030		−19.2%
2010	2,378		17.1%
2020	3,293		38.5%
U.S. Decennial Census

=== 2020 census ===
As of the 2020 census, there were 3,293 people, 1,256 households, and 646 families residing in the city; the median age was 35.2 years, 26.1% of residents were under the age of 18, and 13.8% of residents were 65 years of age or older. For every 100 females there were 91.2 males, and for every 100 females age 18 and over there were 85.8 males age 18 and over.

Of the 1,256 households, 37.2% had children under the age of 18 living in them. Of all households, 34.8% were married-couple households, 20.1% were households with a male householder and no spouse or partner present, and 37.0% were households with a female householder and no spouse or partner present. About 26.9% of all households were made up of individuals and 10.8% had someone living alone who was 65 years of age or older.

There were 1,379 housing units, of which 8.9% were vacant. The homeowner vacancy rate was 1.0% and the rental vacancy rate was 10.9%.

95.0% of residents lived in urban areas, while 5.0% lived in rural areas.

Racial composition as of the 2020 census
Race	Number	Percent
White	1,478	44.9%
Black or African American	1,350	41.0%
American Indian and Alaska Native	3	0.1%
Asian	46	1.4%
Native Hawaiian and Other Pacific Islander	0	0.0%
Some other race	169	5.1%
Two or more races	247	7.5%
Hispanic or Latino (of any race)	276	8.4%

=== 2000 census ===
As of the census of 2000, there were 2,030 people, 822 households, and 571 families residing in the city. The population density was 993.8 inhabitants per square mile (383.7/km^{2}). There were 910 housing units at an average density of 445.5 per square mile (172.0/km^{2}). The racial makeup of the city was 48.92% African American, 46.70% White, 0.39% Native American, 0.34% Asian, 2.32% from other races, and 1.33% from two or more races. Hispanic or Latino of any race were 3.60% of the population.

There were 822 households, out of which 25.7% had children under the age of 18 living with them, 39.2% were married couples living together, 25.2% had a female householder with no husband present, and 30.5% were non-families. 25.4% of all households were made up of individuals, and 9.2% had someone living alone who was 65 years of age or older. The average household size was 2.47 and the average family size was 2.94.

In the city, the population was spread out, with 23.8% under the age of 18, 10.0% from 18 to 24, 29.7% from 25 to 44, 21.6% from 45 to 64, and 14.9% who were 65 years of age or older. The median age was 36 years. For every 100 females, there were 82.9 males. For every 100 females age 18 and over, there were 81.4 males.

The median income for a household in the city was $32,426, and the median income for a family was $36,020. Males had a median income of $31,719 versus $22,756 for females. The per capita income for the city was $16,593. About 8.6% of families and 12.3% of the population were below the poverty line, including 10.6% of those under age 18 and 10.2% of those age 65 or over.
