= Reidville Academy Faculty House =

Historic house in South Carolina, United States

- U.S. National Register of Historic Places
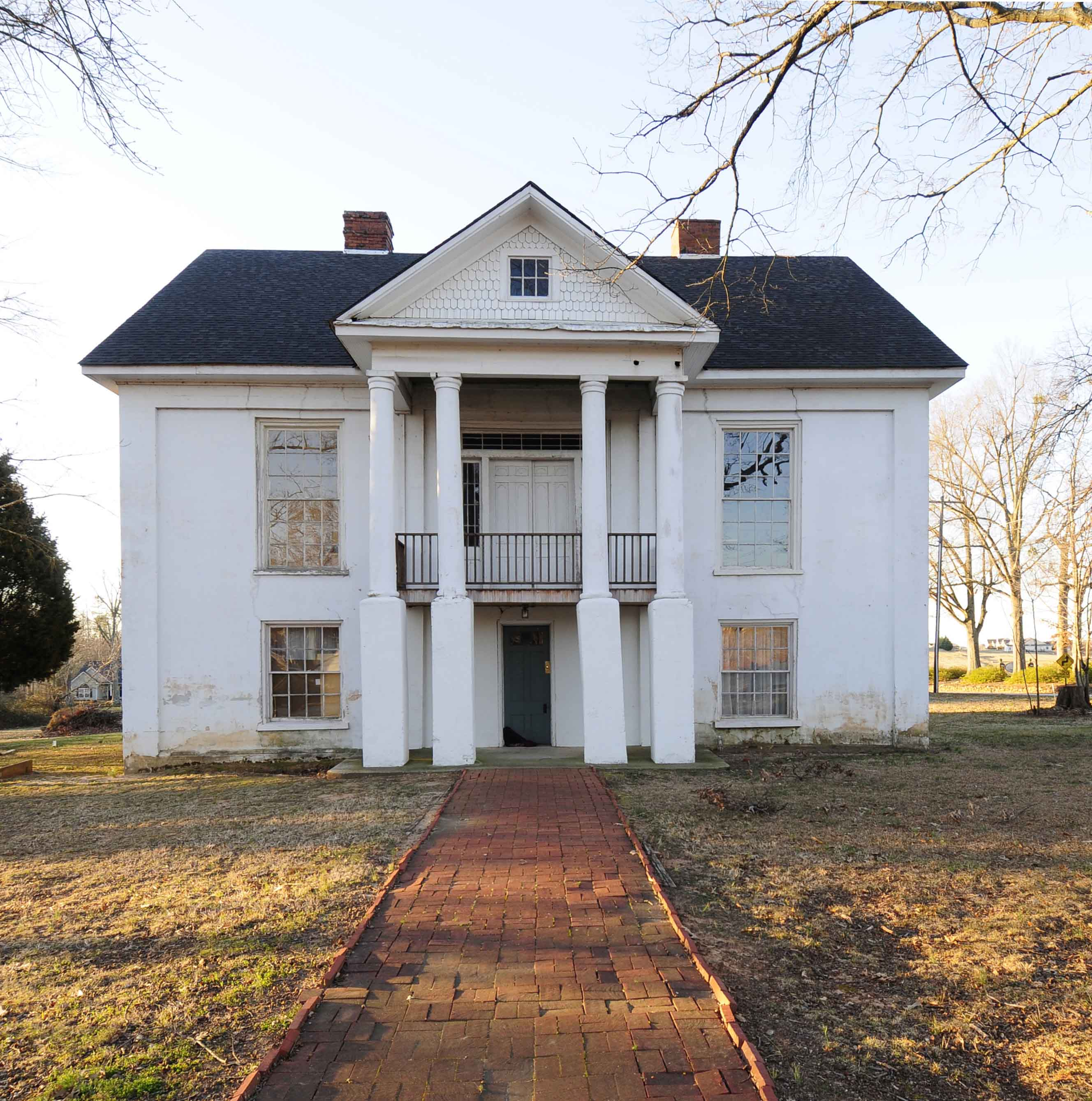

- Location within South Carolina Location within the United States
- Location: Jct. of College and Main Sts., Reidville, South Carolina
- Coordinates: 34°51′37″N 82°6′52″W
- Area: 1.1 acres (0.45 ha)
- Built: 1858
- Architectural style: Greek Revival, Late Victorian
- NRHP reference No.: 97001105
- Added to NRHP: September 4, 1997

Reidville Academy Faculty House is a historic house in Reidville, South Carolina. It was listed on the National Register of Historic Places in 1997.

== History ==
The house was built around 1860 for the principal of the Reidville Male High School, which was later called the Reidville Male Academy. The house is a two-story, brick raised cottage in the Greek Revival style. It is covered with stucco that is scored to look like stone blocks.
