= Converse Mill =

- U.S. National Register of Historic Places
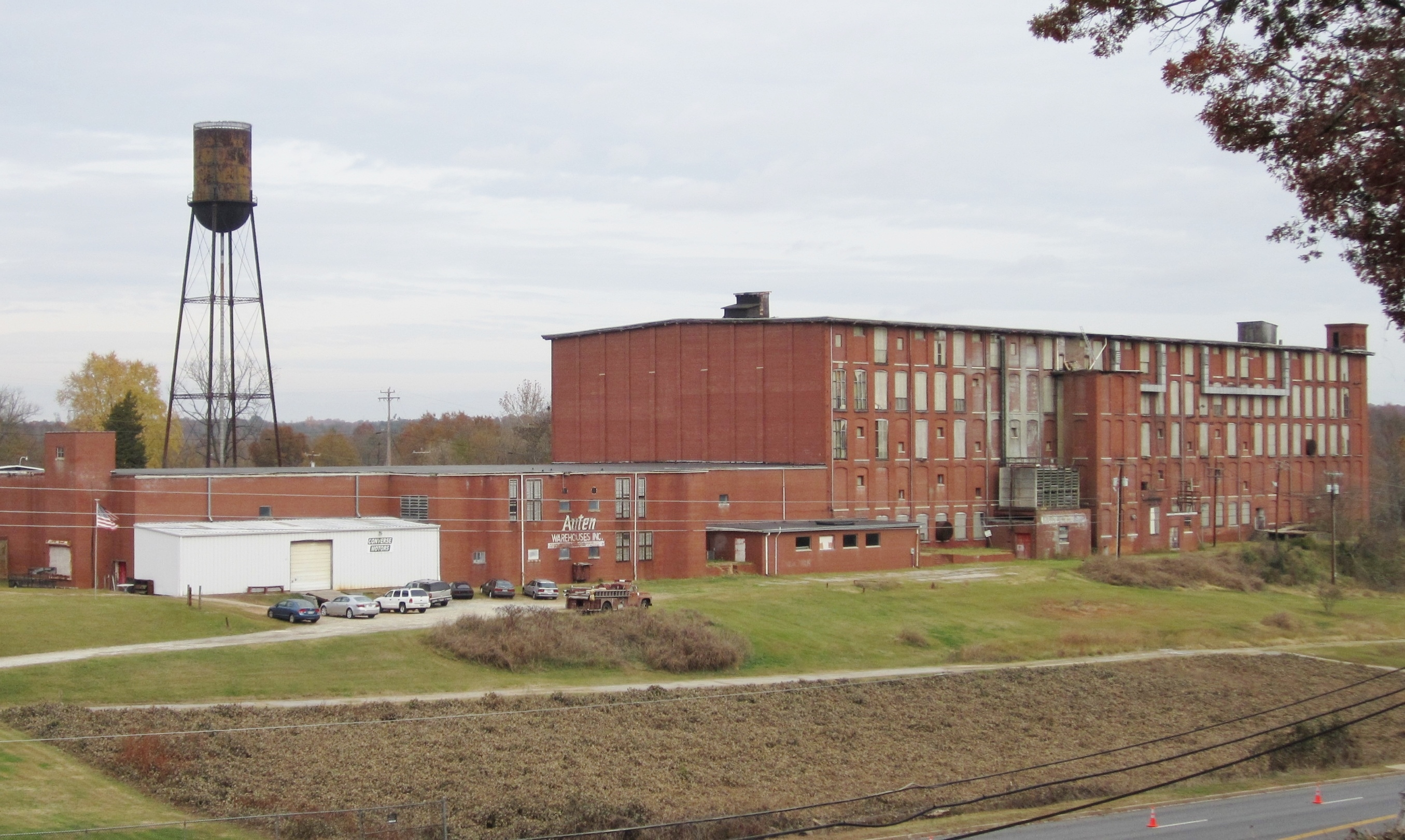

- Location within South Carolina Location within the United States
- Location: 200 High St., Spartanburg, South Carolina
- Coordinates: 34.9280°N 81.9200°W
- Area: 11 acres (4.5 ha)
- Built: 1903
- Architect: Lockwood, Green & Co.
- NRHP reference No.: 15000709
- Added to NRHP: October 5, 2015

The Converse Mill, also known as Clifton Mill #3, is a historic textile mill at 200 High Street in Spartanburg, South Carolina. The main mill building is a four-story brick building with smaller additions, sited on 11 acres (4.5 ha) overlooking the Pacolet River to the east. The mill was built in 1903 on the site of Clifton Mill #3, then the largest textile mill in the world, which had been destroyed by flood. It was designed by the noted industrial architectural firm Lockwood, Green of Boston, Massachusetts. The mill was closed sometime between 1968 and 1973, after which many of its windows were bricked over and it was converted to a warehouse. It is the only surviving element of the Clifton Mill complex, which originally had three large buildings. It is currently being renovated into apartments, some of which have views of the Pacolet River.

The mill was listed on the National Register of Historic Places in 2015.

== See also ==
- National Register of Historic Places listings in Spartanburg County, South Carolina
