= Fremont School =

- U.S. National Register of Historic Places
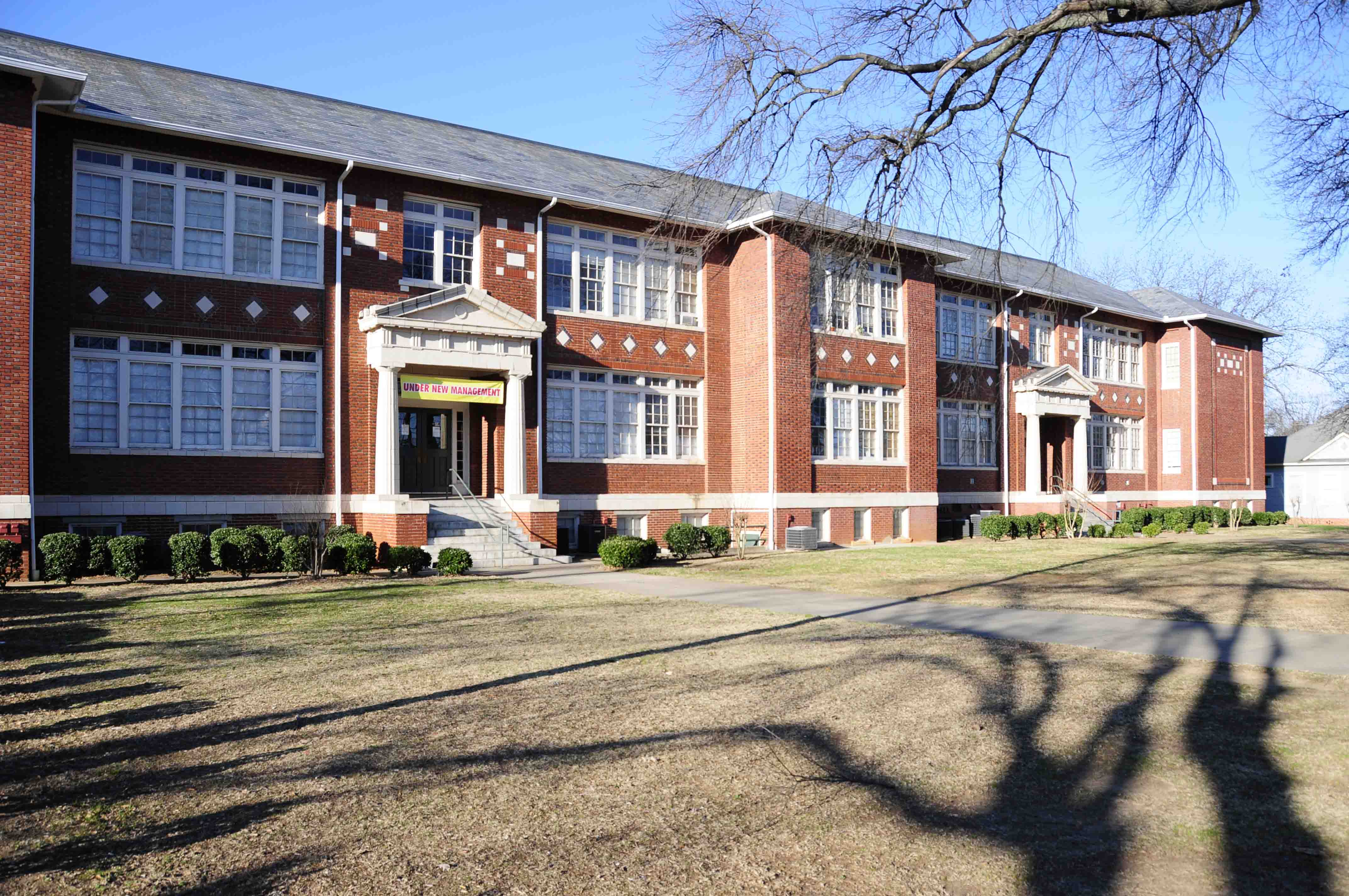
- Fremont School, February 2012

- Location within South Carolina Location within the United States
- Location: 600 Magnolia St., Spartanburg, South Carolina
- Coordinates: 34°57′37″N 81°56′47″W
- Area: 2 acres (0.81 ha)
- Built: 1915, 1926
- Architect: Proffitt, Luther D.; Collins, J. Frank, et al.
- Architectural style: Classical Revival
- NRHP reference No.: 00001234
- Added to NRHP: October 24, 2000

Fremont School, also known as Freemont School, is a historic elementary school building located in Spartanburg, Spartanburg County, South Carolina. It was built in 1915, and is a two-story, brick Classical Revival style building with a partially raised basement, and a major addition built in 1926. It features decorative brickwork, terra cotta ornamentation, and entrance porticoes. The building housed an elementary school from 1915 to 1979.

It was listed on the National Register of Historic Places in 2000.
