= Hurricane Tavern =

- U.S. National Register of Historic Places
- U.S. Historic district
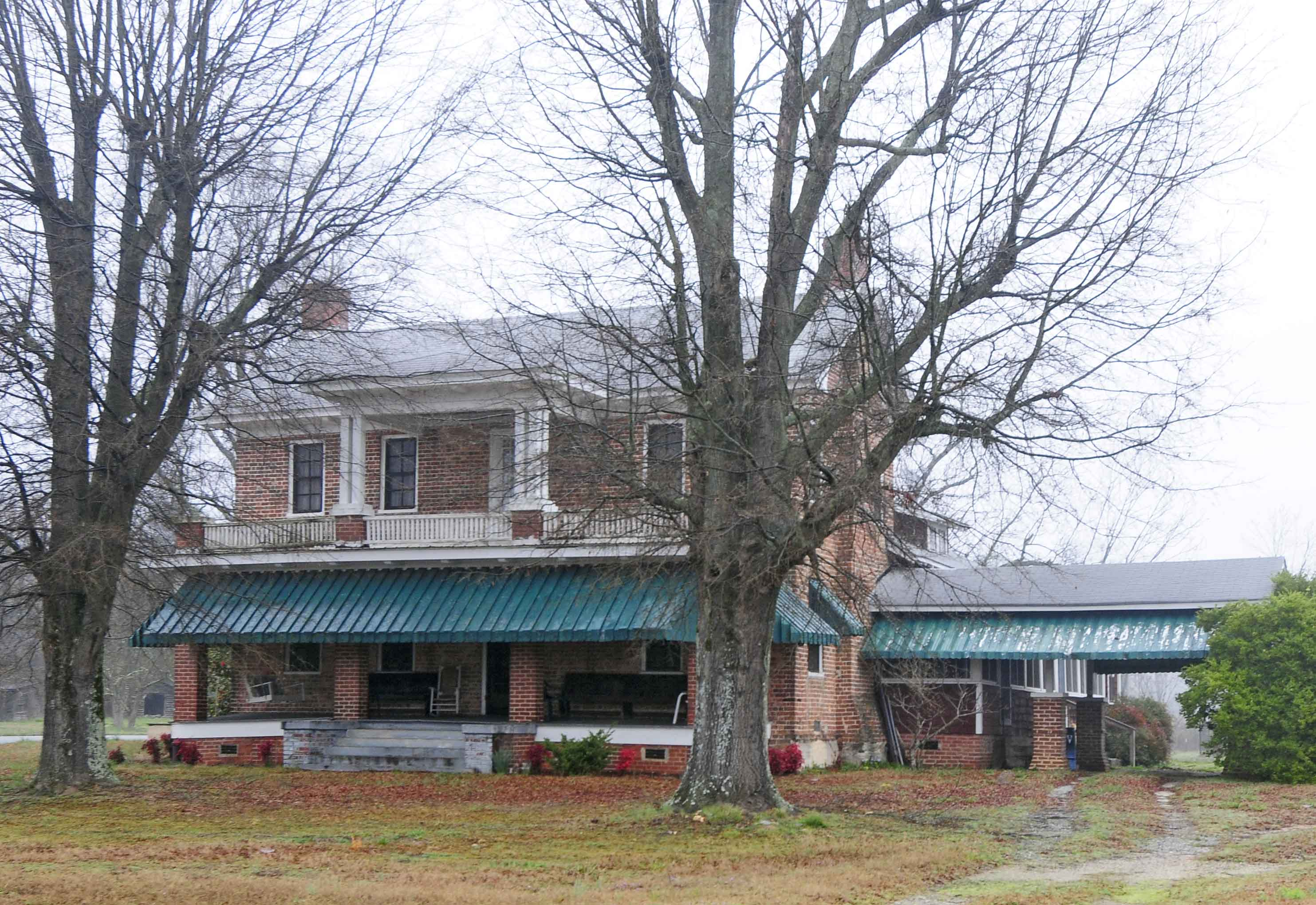
- Hurricane Tavern, February 2012

- Location within South Carolina Location within the United States
- Location: 4101 South Carolina Highway 101, near Woodruff, South Carolina
- Coordinates: 34°48′04″N 82°07′25″W
- Area: 472 acres (191 ha)
- Built: c. 1811
- Built by: Workman, Clarence Hix; Hudson, Burrell V.
- Architectural style: Federal, Bungalow/craftsman
- NRHP reference No.: 01000755
- Added to NRHP: July 19, 2001

Hurricane Tavern, also known as Workman Farm, is a national historic district located near Woodruff, Spartanburg County, South Carolina. The district encompasses 30 contributing buildings, 1 contributing site, and 1 contributing structure on a rural farmstead. They include the vernacular Federal style brick farmhouse, built about 1811, with major alterations and additions about 1850 and Bungalow modifications about 1920; a frame farmhouse (c. 1885, Brockman House), a country store (c. 1924), and a collection of late-19th and early-20th century agricultural outbuildings.

It was listed on the National Register of Historic Places in 2001.
