= Golightly-Dean House =

Historic house in South Carolina, United States

- U.S. National Register of Historic Places
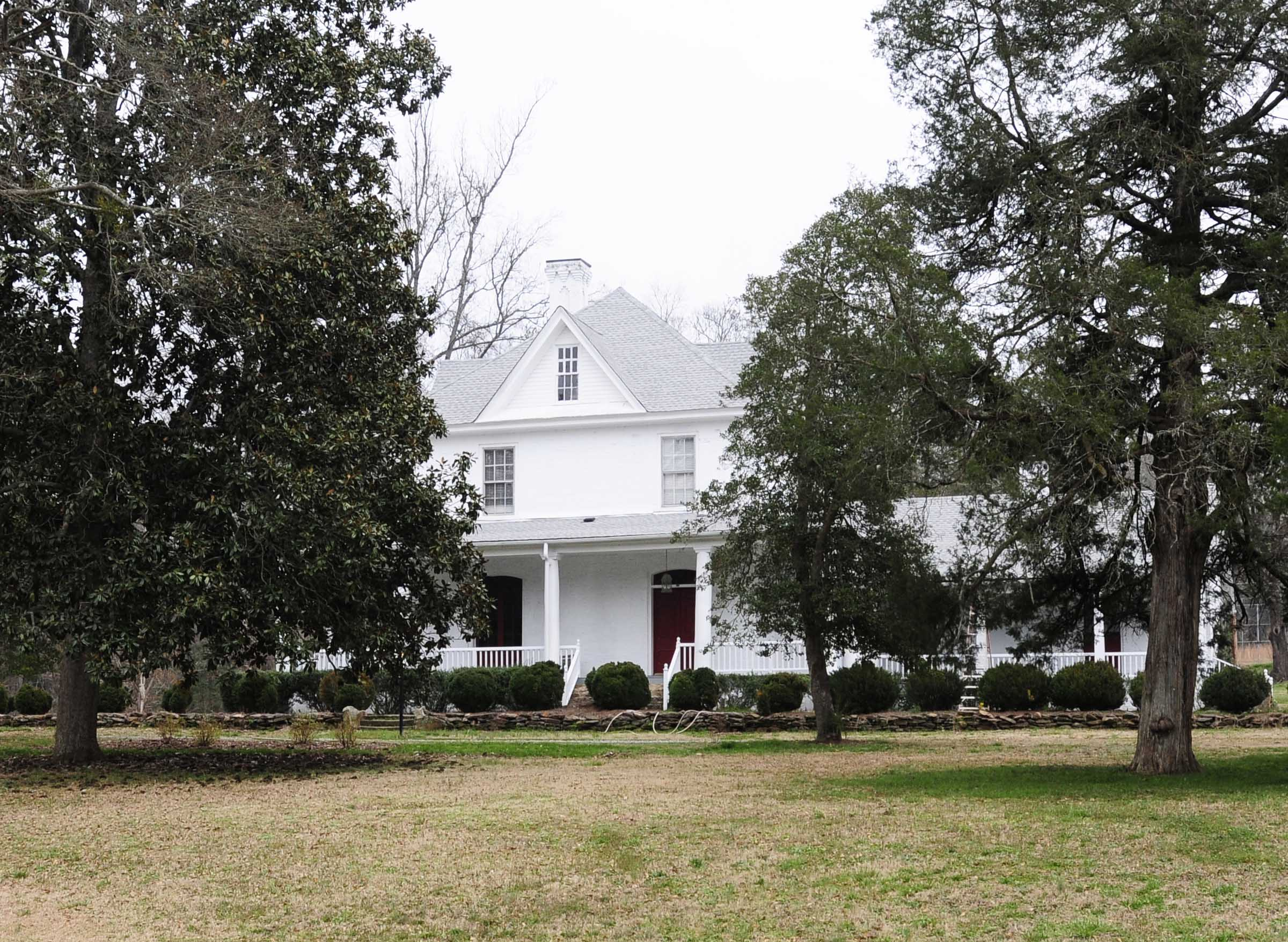
- Golightly-Dean House, February 2012

- Location within South Carolina Location within the United States
- Location: South Carolina Highway 56, near Spartanburg, South Carolina
- Coordinates: 34°52′28″N 81°52′57″W
- Area: 9.9 acres (4.0 ha)
- Built: c. 1784, c. 1830
- Architectural style: Double-pen;side-hall style
- NRHP reference No.: 88001845
- Added to NRHP: September 29, 1988

Golightly-Dean House is a historic home located near Spartanburg, Spartanburg County, South Carolina. The oldest section dates before 1784. It is the one-story, double-pen, masonry wing. About 1830, the two-story, brick portion of the house was added. Following an 1884 tornado, further modifications were made to the dwelling. Located on the property are a contributing log smokehouse and a log shed.

The house and other buildings on the property fell into disarray from neglect until newlyweds Joe and Lena Webb bought and renovated the building following World War Two.

It was listed on the National Register of Historic Places in 1988 thanks to efforts by the then-owners, the Webb family, particularly Lena Webb.
