= Mountain Shoals Plantation =

Historic house in South Carolina, United States

- U.S. National Register of Historic Places
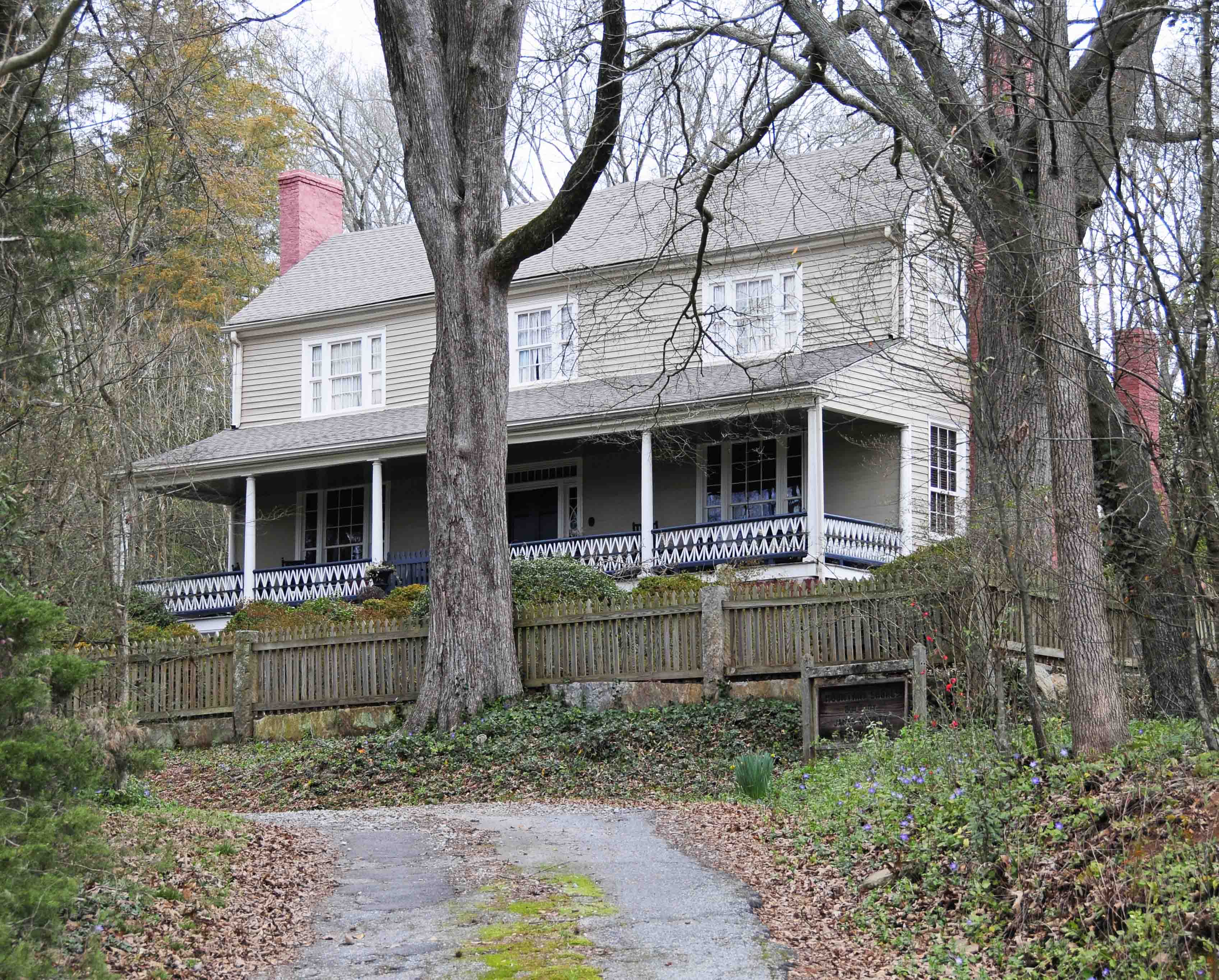
- Mountain Shoals Plantation, February 2012

- Location within South Carolina Location within the United States
- Location: Jct. of U.S. 221 and SC 92, Enoree, South Carolina
- Coordinates: 34°39′9″N 81°57′50″W
- Area: 2.8 acres (1.1 ha)
- Built: c. 1837
- Architectural style: Federal
- NRHP reference No.: 79002394
- Added to NRHP: April 24, 1979

Mountain Shoals Plantation, also known as the James Nesbitt House, is a historic plantation house located at Enoree, Spartanburg County, South Carolina. It was built by 1837, and is a two-story, vernacular Federal style frame residence. It sits on a raised brick basement stuccoed to resemble granite and features a full-width, one-story, front porch. Also located on the property is a contributing well house and a one-story log cabin (c. 1815).

It was listed on the National Register of Historic Places in 1979.
