= Enoree, South Carolina =

Enoree
- CDP
- Location within the state of South Carolina
- Coordinates: 34°39′33″N 81°57′39″W
- Country: United States
- State: South Carolina
- County: Spartanburg

Area
  - Total: 1.59 sq mi (4.11 km^{2})
  - Land: 1.55 sq mi (4.01 km^{2})
  - Water: 0.039 sq mi (0.10 km^{2})
- Elevation: 548 ft (167 m)

Population (2020)
  - Total: 687
  - Density: 443.5/sq mi (171.24/km^{2})
- Time zone: UTC-5 (Eastern (EST))
  - Summer (DST): UTC-4 (EDT)
- ZIP codes: 29335
- FIPS code: 45083
- GNIS feature ID: 2629824

Enoree is a Census-designated place located in Spartanburg County in the U.S. state of South Carolina. According to the 2010 United States census, the population was 665.

== History ==
Mountain Shoals Plantation was listed on the National Register of Historic Places in 1979.

== Geography ==
Enoree is located in the southwestern part of the county, near the border with Laurens County.

According to the United States Census Bureau, the CDP has a total land area of 1.548 square miles (3.973 km^{2}) and a total water area of 0.036 square mile (0.093 km^{2}).

== Demographics ==
Historical population
Census	Pop.	Note	%±
2020	687		—
U.S. Decennial Census

== Education ==
The school district is Spartanburg School District 4.
