= Pelham, South Carolina =

Pelham
- Unincorporated community
- Location within the state of South Carolina
- Coordinates: 34°51′25″N 82°13′26″W
- Country: United States
- State: South Carolina
- County: Spartanburg
- Elevation: 778 ft (237 m)
- Time zone: UTC-5 (Eastern (EST))
  - Summer (DST): UTC-4 (EDT)
- GNIS feature ID: 1250052

Pelham (also known as Sugar Tit) is an unincorporated community in Spartanburg County in the upstate of the U.S. state of South Carolina. The Sugar Tit area has about five mile radius around Joe's Lake. It is located around the junction of State 101 and State 296 southeast of Greer, between Reidville and Five Forks. It is mostly farmland and plantations. After BMW came more subdivisions and industrial parks appeared in the area.

The Sugar Tit name is from a time when the men spent so long socializing at the local general store, their wives complained they took to the store like a baby to a sugar tit.
