= Bon Haven =

Historic house in South Carolina, United States

- Formerly listed on the U.S. National Register of Historic Places
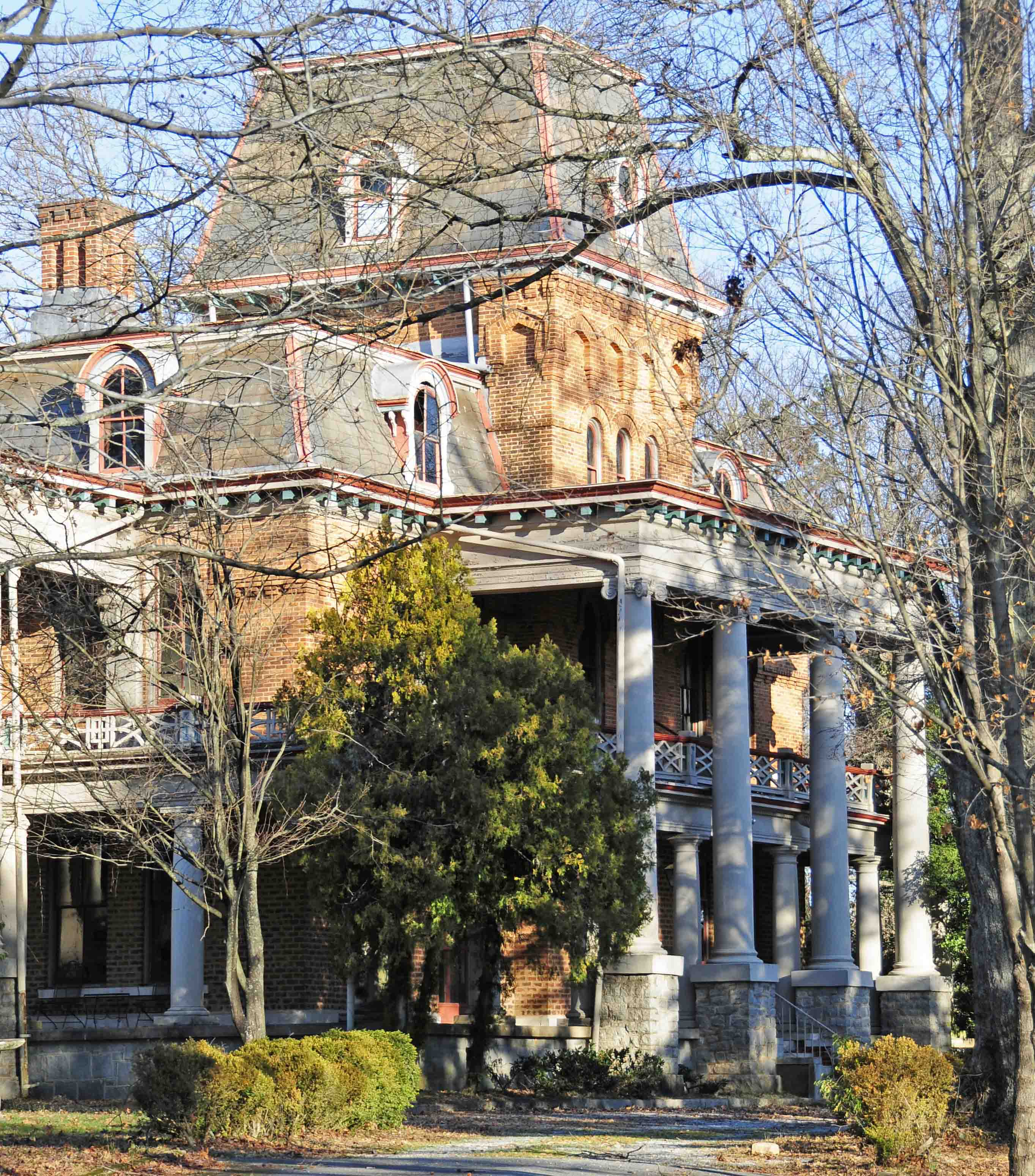
- Bon Haven, February 2012

- Location within South Carolina Location within the United States
- Location: 728 N. Church Street, Spartanburg, South Carolina
- Coordinates: 34°57′48″N 81°56′38″W
- Area: 6.4 acres (2.6 ha)
- Built: 1884
- Architectural style: Second Empire
- Demolished: September 25, 2017
- NRHP reference No.: 76001711

Significant dates
- Added to NRHP: June 29, 1976
- Removed from NRHP: February 27, 2020

Bon Haven, also known as The Cleveland House, was an historic house located in Spartanburg, Spartanburg County, South Carolina. It was built about 1884, and was a two-story, brick Second Empire style dwelling with 1920s Neo-Classical style additions. It featured a mansard roof, central tower and massive Ionic order columns and portico. Its builder, John B. Cleveland, was a founder and trustee of Converse College, a trustee of Wofford College, and played a role in the establishment of Spartanburg's city school system. It was listed on the National Register of Historic Places in 1976.

The property was in a state of disrepair when a couple from Greenville offered to purchase Bon Haven for ~$380,000 and promised to historically restore the property and make it a venue or bed and breakfast. Bon Haven was demolished on September 25, 2017. It was removed from the National Register in 2020. An apartment complex, also named Bon Haven, was built on the former site of the house in 2021.
