= King Edward VI Camp Hill School =

King Edward VI Camp Hill School may refer to:

- King Edward VI Camp Hill Schools, also known as Camp Hill Schools, the joint name for two adjacent twinned grammar schools that share a campus in Birmingham, England.
  The constituent schools are:
  - King Edward VI Camp Hill School for Boys, a boys' grammar school in Birmingham, England
  - King Edward VI Camp Hill School for Girls, a girls' grammar school in Birmingham, England
