= New Hope Farm (Wellford, South Carolina) =

- U.S. National Register of Historic Places
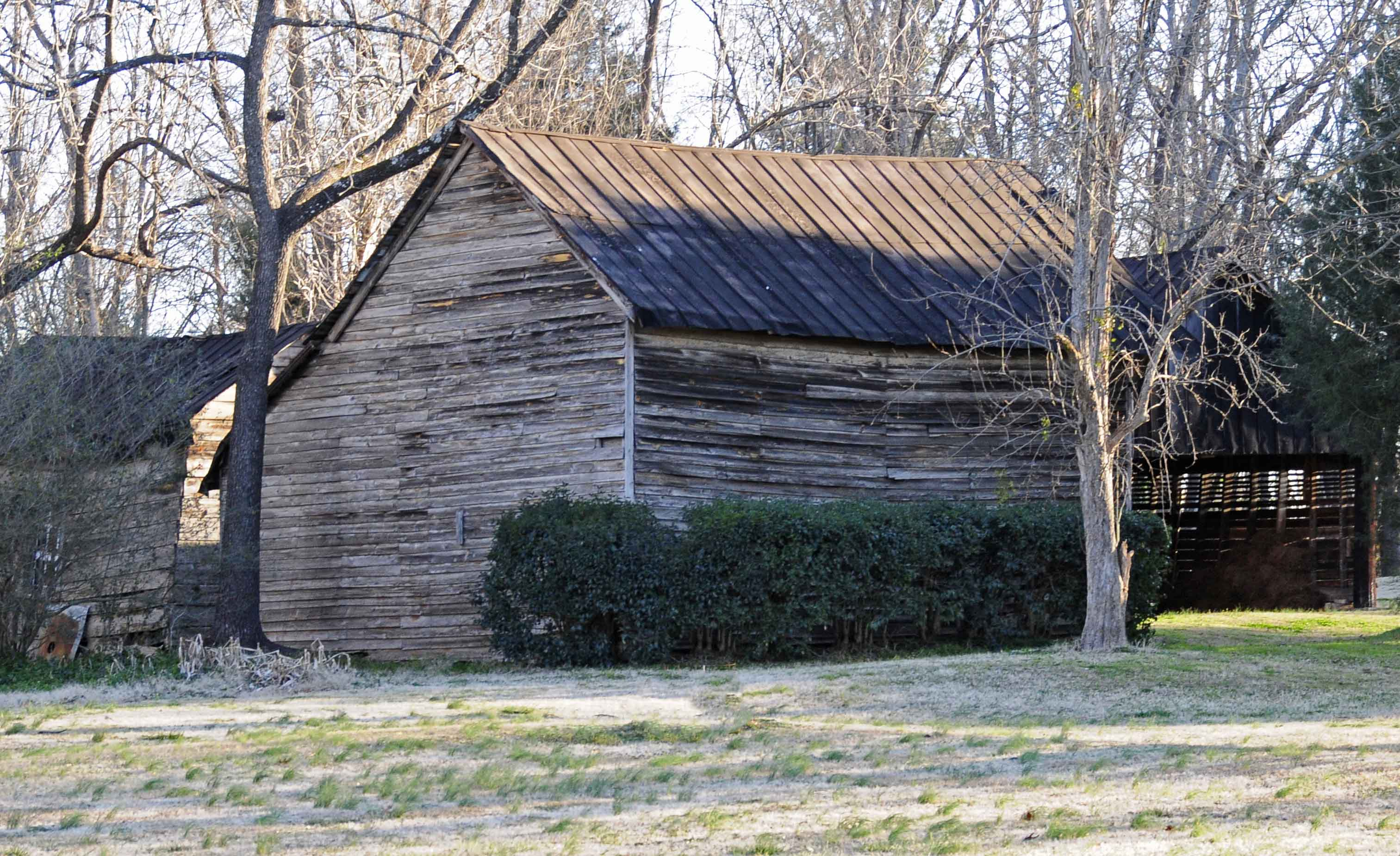
- New Hope Farm, February 2012

- Location within South Carolina Location within the United States
- Location: 10088 Greenville Hwy., Wellford, South Carolina
- Coordinates: 34°56′22″N 82°04′18″W
- Area: 25 acres (10 ha)
- Built: 1885
- Built by: Foggette, E.; Howe, Henry
- Architectural style: Queen Anne, Stick/eastlake
- NRHP reference No.: 98000558
- Added to NRHP: May 20, 1999

New Hope Farm, also known as New Hope Post Office and Snoddy Farm, is a historic farm complex located at Wellford, Spartanburg County, South Carolina. The main house was built in 1885, and is a one-story farmhouse with Folk Victorian decorative elements. It features a steeply pitched pressed metal-shingled roof, weatherboard siding, and a wraparound hip-roofed porch. Also on the property is a complex of domestic and agricultural outbuildings dating from about 1885 to 1905. They include a small two-story frame servant's house, a smokehouse, a privy, a corn crib, a buggy barn and a garage.

It was listed on the National Register of Historic Places in 1999.
