= Glenn Springs Historic District =

Historic district in South Carolina, United States

- U.S. National Register of Historic Places
- U.S. Historic district
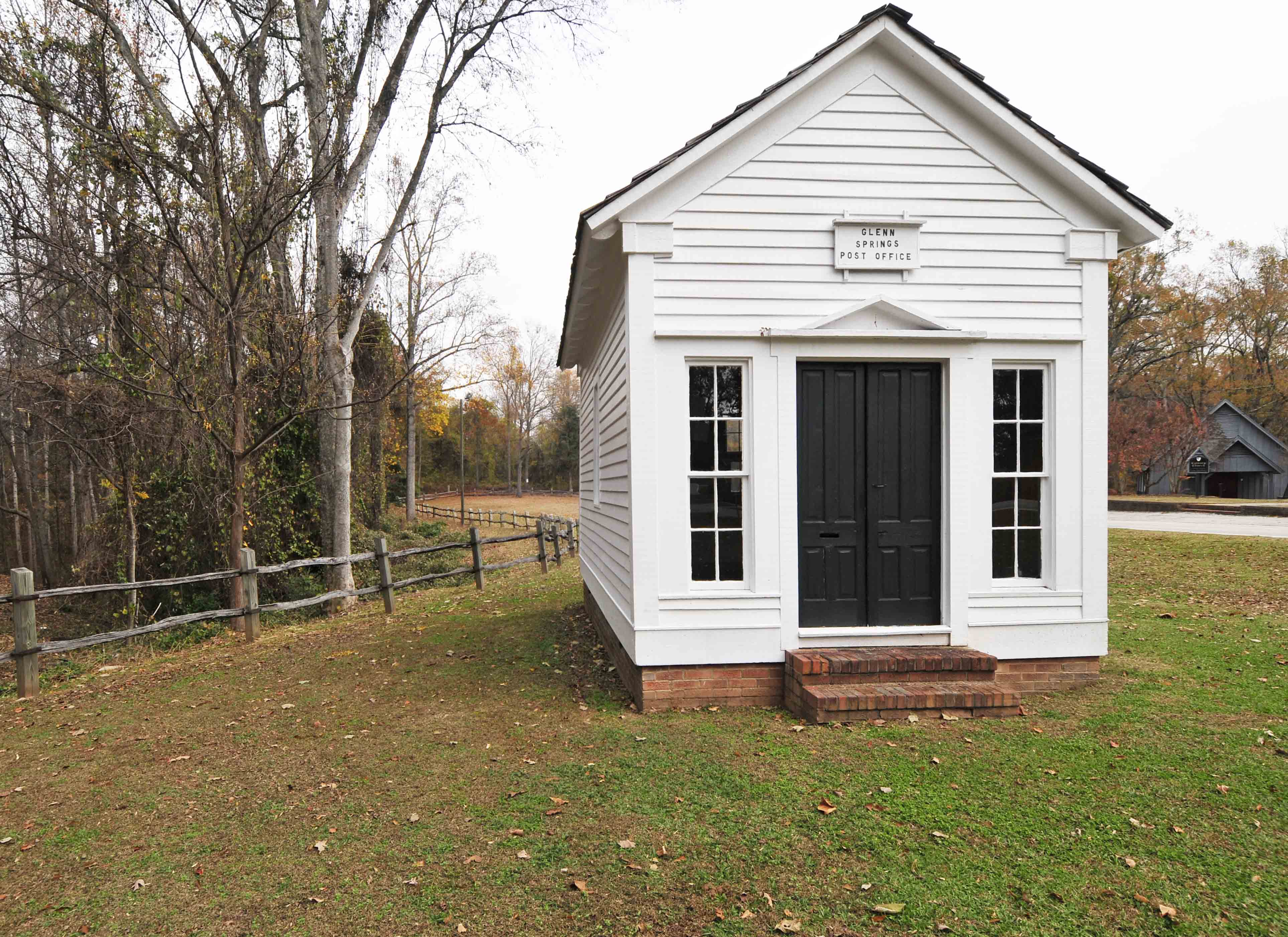
- Glenn Springs Post Office, November 2011

- Location within South Carolina Location within the United States
- Location: SC 150 and Rich Hill Rd., Glenn Springs, South Carolina
- Coordinates: 34°49′05″N 81°49′45″W
- Area: 82 acres (33 ha)
- Architectural style: Late Victorian, Queen Anne
- NRHP reference No.: 82001526
- Added to NRHP: November 4, 1982

Glenn Springs Historic District is a national historic district located at Glenn Springs, Spartanburg County, South Carolina. It encompasses 18 contributing buildings and 3 contributing sites in the historic health resort of Glenn Springs. The community developed as a resort around the mineral springs between about 1840 and 1940. The district includes several residences, two boarding houses, Cates House Ruins, Calvary Protestant Episcopal Church, Presbyterian Church, Cates Store, Glenn Springs Post Office, a pavilion, a cemetery, and the site of the Glenn Springs Hotel. It includes notable buildings in the Greek Revival, Gothic Revival, Queen Anne, and Bungalow styles.

It was listed on the National Register of Historic Places in 1982.
