= Reidville, South Carolina =

- Town
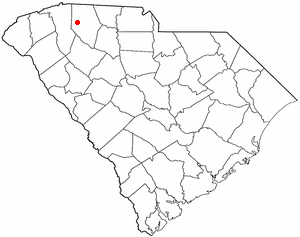
- Location of Reidville, South Carolina
- Coordinates: 34°52′12″N 82°06′07″W
- Country: United States
- State: South Carolina
- County: Spartanburg

Area
  - Total: 1.78 sq mi (4.62 km^{2})
  - Land: 1.76 sq mi (4.56 km^{2})
  - Water: 0.023 sq mi (0.06 km^{2})
- Elevation: 794 ft (242 m)

Population (2020)
  - Total: 1,634
  - Density: 927.6/sq mi (358.16/km^{2})
- Time zone: UTC-5 (Eastern (EST))
  - Summer (DST): UTC-4 (EDT)
- ZIP code: 29375
- Area codes: 864, 821
- FIPS code: 45-59425
- GNIS feature ID: 2407197
- Website: Reidville, South Carolina

Reidville is a town in Spartanburg County, South Carolina, United States. As of the 2020 census, Reidville had a population of 1,634.

== History ==
A post office has been in operation at Reidville since 1858. The community was named for R. H. Reid, a local minister.

Reidville Academy Faculty House was listed on the National Register of Historic Places in 1997.

== Geography ==
According to the United States Census Bureau, the town has a total area of 1.4 square miles (3.5 km^{2}), all land.

== Demographics ==
Historical population
| Census | Pop. | Note | %± |
|---|---|---|---|
| 1880 | 266 | | — |
| 1890 | 156 | | −41.4% |
| 1900 | 162 | | 3.8% |
| 1910 | 177 | | 9.3% |
| 1920 | 231 | | 30.5% |
| 1930 | 208 | | −10.0% |
| 1940 | 214 | | 2.9% |
| 1950 | 236 | | 10.3% |
| 1960 | 242 | | 2.5% |
| 1970 | 460 | | 90.1% |
| 2000 | 478 | | — |
| 2010 | 601 | | 25.7% |
| 2020 | 1,634 | | 171.9% |
U.S. Decennial Census

As of the census of 2000, there were 478 people, 195 households, and 146 families residing in the town. The population density was 350.1 inhabitants per square mile (135.2/km^{2}). There were 209 housing units at an average density of 153.1 per square mile (59.1/km^{2}). The racial makeup of the town was 90.59% White, 7.95% African American, 0.63% Asian, and 0.84% from two or more races. Hispanic or Latino of any race were 1.67% of the population.

There were 195 households, out of which 30.3% had children under the age of 18 living with them, 63.1% were married couples living together, 8.7% had a female householder with no husband present, and 25.1% were non-families. 23.1% of all households were made up of individuals, and 10.3% had someone living alone who was 65 years of age or older. The average household size was 2.45 and the average family size was 2.90.

In the town, the population was spread out, with 19.9% under the age of 18, 6.7% from 18 to 24, 33.1% from 25 to 44, 25.9% from 45 to 64, and 14.4% who were 65 years of age or older. The median age was 39 years. For every 100 females, there were 100.8 males. For every 100 females age 18 and over, there were 100.5 males.

The median income for a household in the town was $39,861, and the median income for a family was $51,111. Males had a median income of $50,721 versus $21,635 for females. The per capita income for the town was $20,511. About 5.0% of families and 5.3% of the population were below the poverty line, including none of those under age 18 and 8.6% of those age 65 or over.
