= Glenn Springs, South Carolina =

Glenn Springs
- Census-designated place
- Location within the state of South Carolina
- Coordinates: 34°48′48″N 81°50′29″W
- Country: United States
- State: South Carolina
- County: Spartanburg

Area
  - Total: 2.23 sq mi (5.77 km^{2})
  - Land: 2.22 sq mi (5.74 km^{2})
  - Water: 0.012 sq mi (0.03 km^{2})
- Elevation: 751 ft (229 m)

Population (2020)
  - Total: 263
  - Density: 118.6/sq mi (45.81/km^{2})
- Time zone: UTC-5 (Eastern (EST))
  - Summer (DST): UTC-4 (EDT)
- FIPS code: 45-29320
- GNIS feature ID: 2812991

Glenn Springs is an unincorporated community and census-designated place (CDP) in Spartanburg County, South Carolina, United States located at a spring. It was first listed as a CDP in the 2020 census with a population of 263.

== History ==
The healing waters of the Glenn Springs were known around the country for over one hundred years. It was said that the waters would heal almost any illness. It is even said that the Indians came to the springs for its healing powers. In the late 18th century, the land around the springs was granted to a Henry Storey by the king. Even George Washington was said to have stopped there to try the waters on a trip to Georgia.

In 1825, John B. Glenn bought the land and opened an inn. The springs took its name from Mr. Glenn. His inn was so popular that in 1835 stock was sold to help build a large hotel on the land. The hotel was known for its elegance and comforts as well as its water. Small cabins and a bottling facility were also built around the inn. The bottles water was even kept in the cloak rooms of many congressmen until the 1940s when the hotel burned. Unfortunately, it was never rebuilt. At one point around the start of the 20th century, there was even a railroad that took patrons from Roebuck, then called Becka, to the inn.

J W Bell owned Glen Springs from the 1930s until 1970. The J W Bell Company in Spartanburg, South Carolina would bottle the spring water in One gallon Glass Bottles and sold it to Drug stores and delivered to homes. It was believed to have many healing properties.

The Glenn Springs Historic District and Williams Place are listed on the National Register of Historic Places.

== Education ==
Glenn Springs is in Spartanburg County School District 6.

== Demographics ==
Historical population
Census	Pop.	Note	%±
2020	263		—
U.S. Decennial Census; 2020

Glenn Springs first appeared as a census designated place in the 2020 U.S. census.

=== 2020 census ===
Glenn Springs CDP, South Carolina – Demographic Profile (NH = Non-Hispanic)
Race / Ethnicity	Pop 2020	% 2020
White alone (NH)	245	93.16%
Black or African American alone (NH)	6	2.28%
Native American or Alaska Native alone (NH)	0	0.00%
Asian alone (NH)	2	0.76%
Pacific Islander alone (NH)	0	0.00%
Some Other Race alone (NH)	0	0.00%
Mixed Race/Multi-Racial (NH)	6	2.28%
Hispanic or Latino (any race)	4	1.52%
Total	263	100.00%

Note: the US Census treats Hispanic/Latino as an ethnic category. This table excludes Latinos from the racial categories and assigns them to a separate category. Hispanics/Latinos can be of any race.
