= Merrimack Mill Village Historic District =

- U.S. National Register of Historic Places
- U.S. Historic district
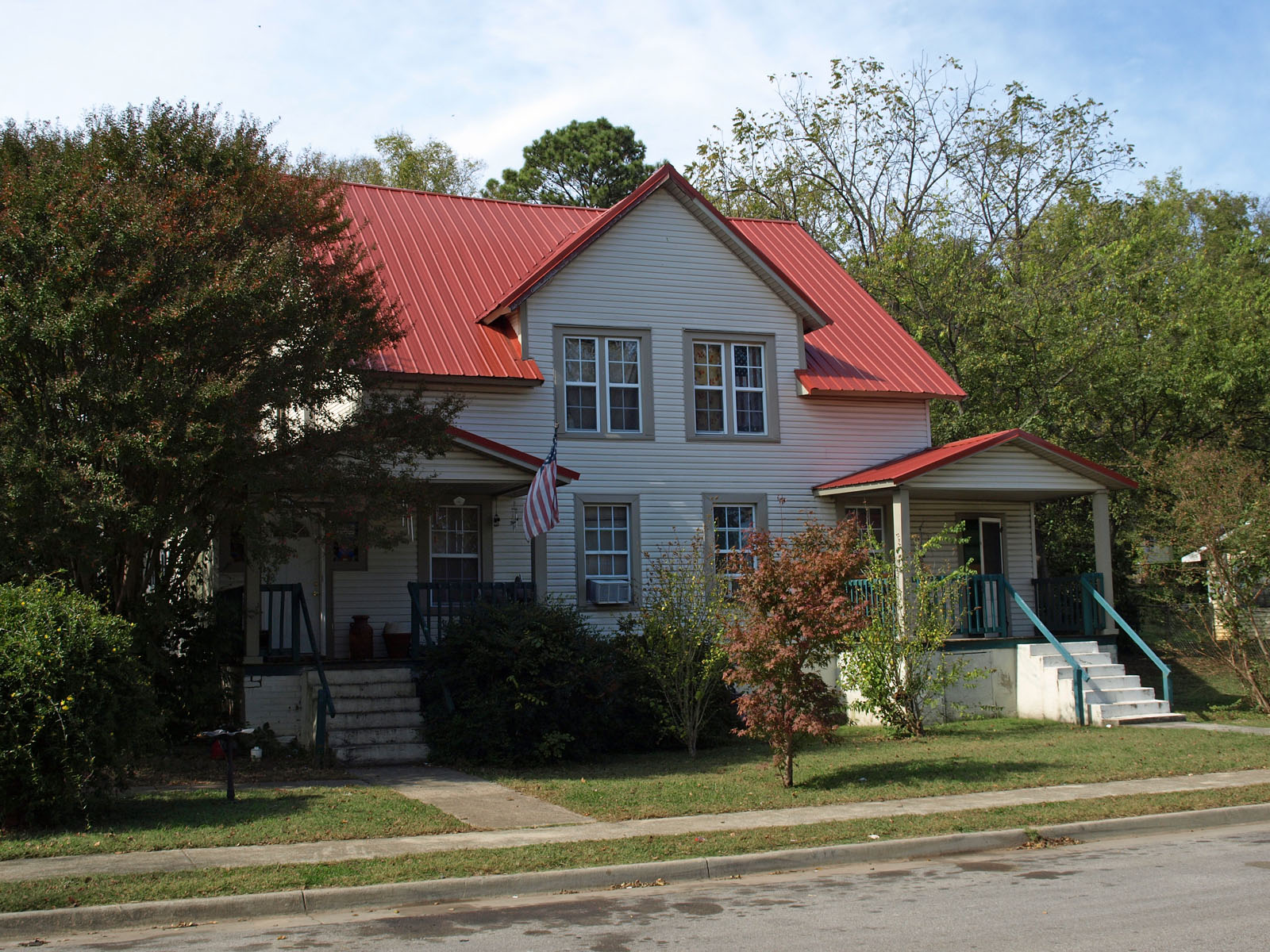
- 3312 and 3314 Alpine Street in October 2011

- Location within Huntsville, Alabama Location within Alabama Location within the United States
- Location: Alpine St., Triana Blvd., Dunn Dr., Cobb Rd., Drake Ave., & Grote St., Huntsville, Alabama
- Coordinates: 34°42′15″N 86°36′41″W
- Area: 112 acres (45 ha)
- Architect: Lockwood, Greene & Co. (mill buildings)
- Architectural style: Bungalow, American craftsman, Colonial Revival
- NRHP reference No.: 10000172
- Added to NRHP: April 16, 2010

The Merrimack Mill Village Historic District is a historic district in Huntsville, Alabama. The cotton mill was built in 1900 by the Merrimack Manufacturing Company, reaching a peak of 1,600 employees by 1955. The mill was sold in 1946, and became known as the Huntsville Manufacturing Company. It operated until 1989 and was torn down in 1992. Houses in the adjoining mill village were built between 1900 and 1937, and encompass many mill house styles not commonly seen outside New England. The district was listed on the National Register of Historic Places in 2010.

== History ==
In 1898 the Merrimack Manufacturing Company, based in Lowell, Massachusetts, began to look for a location to build a cotton spinning mill in the Southern United States. Tracy W. Pratt, a Huntsville businessman who owned the West Huntsville Cotton Mill and would later be instrumental in building Lowe Mill, convinced the company to choose a site southwest of Huntsville. The company broke ground on 1,385 acres (560 ha) near Brahan Spring the following year, and the mill opened in 1900. The mill produced grey cloth which was finished in Rock Hill, South Carolina. When it opened, the mill employed about 500–750 people, operating 1,800 looms and 25,000 spindles. The mill was powered by steam from a coal boiler until it was converted to electricity in 1920. A village of about 60 houses was built to house the workers. The village also contained a dry goods store, operated by the W. L. Halsey Company, which also had space for community organization meetings.

Soon after opening, Merrimack announced the construction of a second mill, which would be completed in 1904. The new mill brought the capacity up to 90,000 spindles and 2,900 looms. Joseph J. Bradley, Sr., became the mill's agent in 1905; he began improving services for those in the village. The first hospital opened in one of the village houses in 1913 and was replaced by a larger, dedicated facility in 1916. The first school also opened in 1913, followed by a four-room schoolhouse in 1914 and a larger brick building in 1919, which was later named in Bradley's honor. Several new houses were also built in the 1910s. Buoyed by profits from high production during World War I, the mill expanded in 1920, adding 30,000 square feet (2,800 sq. m.) to Mill No. 1. The mill store was greatly expanded the same year, incorporating the old frame structure and adding a gymnasium, theater, two community rooms, and other amenities. Beginning in 1922, the village houses were wired for electricity, and sidewalks and a sanitary sewer system were added. Further houses were built, bringing the total to 279 by 1925.

During the 1920s and the Great Depression, the company fell into financial trouble. Merrimack reached 1400 employees in 1925, but just two years later, employment had fallen to 850. To raise capital, the mill began selling the village houses, first to employees and then to investors, although they continued to build new houses until 1937. Labor unions also became a presence among the workforce. From July 17 until September 22, 1934, a strike by the United Textile Workers of America brought violence to Huntsville, as part of a nationwide effort to improve working conditions in textile mills; another strike at Merrimack and Dallas Mill followed in 1937. Business rebounded during World War II, but soon after, facing aging equipment and soft prices due to overseas competition, Merrimack sold the mill to M. Lowenstein and Co. of New York City.

At the time of the sale, the mill employed about 800 and had 110,000 spindles and 2,500 looms. Lowenstein invested $1.7 million in modernizing equipment, and expanded to a 24-hour production day. Beginning in 1949, 269 more houses were sold to employees. Two years later, the school was donated to the Madison County School District and Brahan Springs, behind the mill, was donated to the city. By 1955, the two mill buildings were connected, and the entire mill was air conditioned, bringing the mill to its peak of 1,600 employees, 145,896 spindles, and 3,437 looms. Lowenstein sold the mill to Springs Industries in 1988, who operated it for one year before closing it completely. The mills were demolished in 1992, and the land today is used as soccer fields.

== Architecture ==
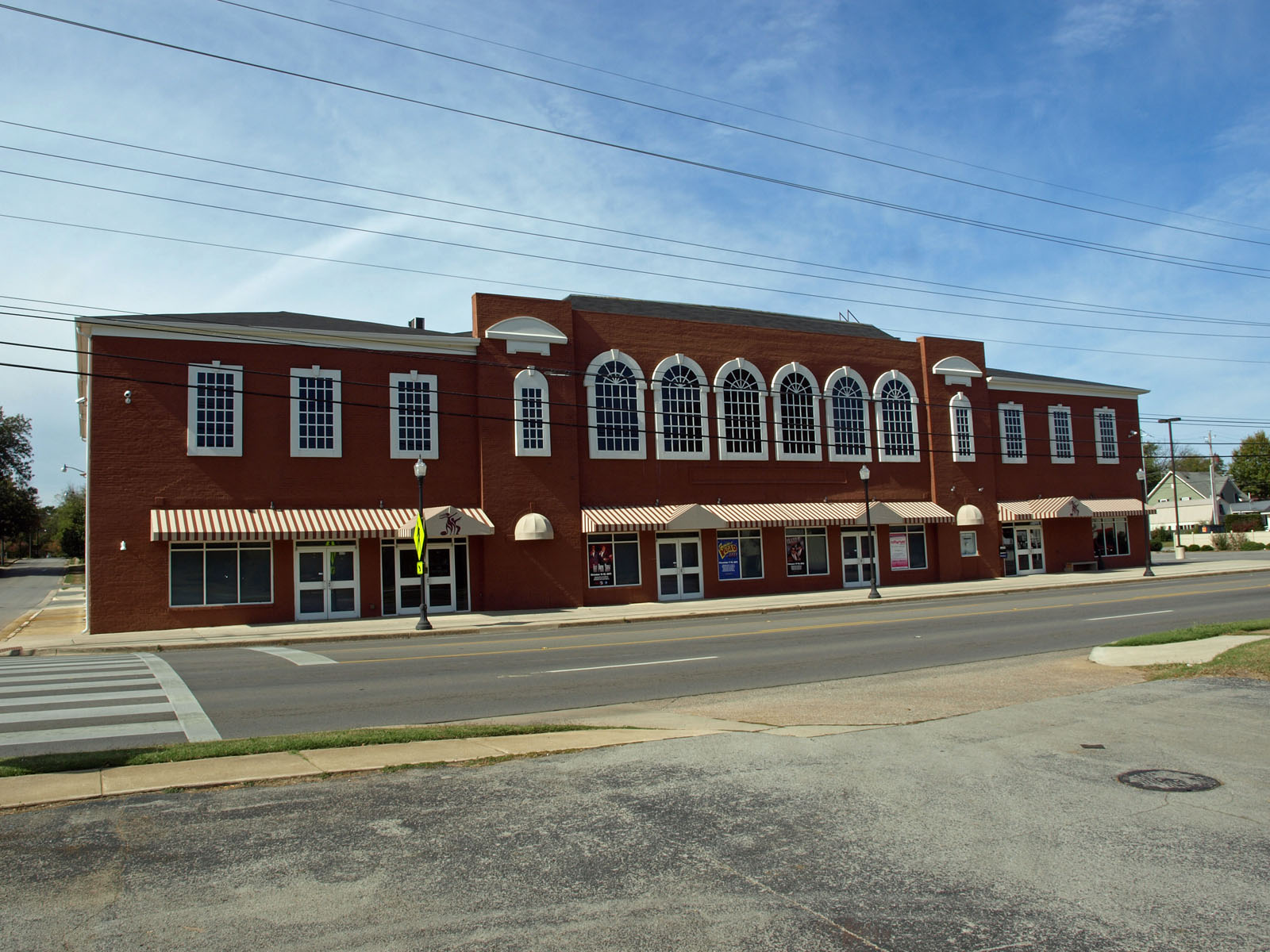
Merrimack Hall served as the mill's store and community center

External image
- Images of the mill and village from the Huntsville-Madison County Public Library

The mill buildings, completed in 1900 and 1904, were designed by preeminent mill architects Lockwood, Greene & Co. Mill No. 1 was three stories and Mill No. 2 was five stories, both of brick with arched lintels and stone sills. Mill No. 1 had the carding, drawing, and picking areas plus a repair shop on the first floor; weaving on the second floor; and spooling, warping, and spinning on the third.

The village is laid out along a grid pattern broken by a Y-shaped street which led to the mill and contained the superintendent's house in the Y. This design is identical to that of Merrimack's mill village in Massachusetts, platted in 1820. The houses followed several basic plans: Type A, a one-story, duplex shotgun house; Type B, a rectangular duplex with double central entry doors and a shed roof porch; Type J, a two-story I-house, usually with a shed roof rear addition; Type L, a two-story, cross-gable duplex with side entrances covered by shallow-pitched gable porches; and Type M, a one-story, hipped roof duplex with a shed roofed front porch. The 96 Type L houses, most of which were constructed in the first wave of construction before 1910, represent the largest collection of the type in the South.
