= Lockwood, Greene & Co. =

American architectural firm

Lockwood, Greene & Company
- Industry: Engineering
- Predecessor: A. D. Lockwood; A. D. Lockwood & Company
- Founded: 1871
- Founder: Amos D. Lockwood
- Defunct: 2017
- Successor: Lockwood Greene Engineers; CH2M Hill Engineers; CH2M Engineers; Jacobs Engineering
- Headquarters: Boston (1871-1875 and 1890-1928); Providence (1875-1890); New York (1928-1973); Spartanburg (from 1973), United States

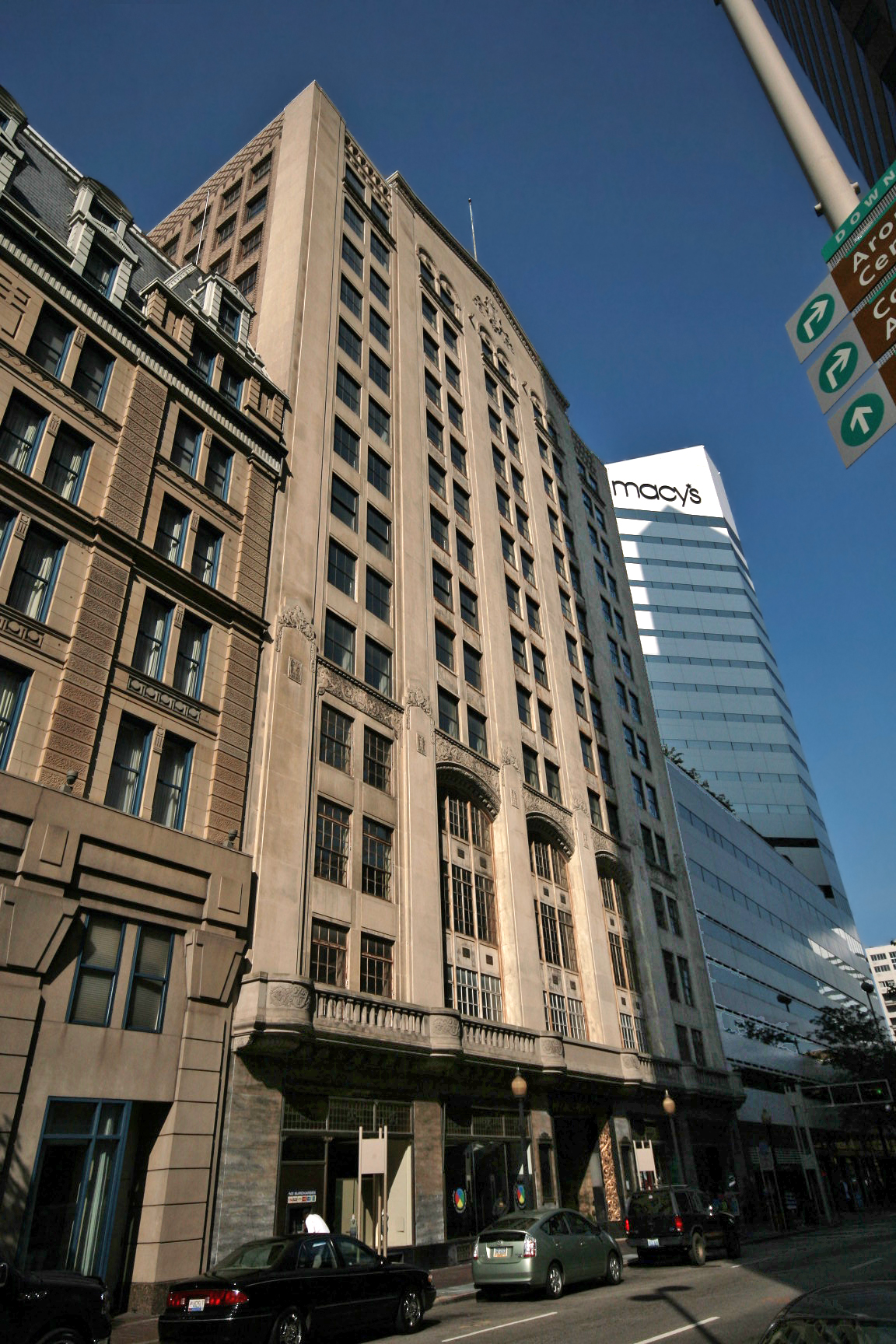
Cincinnati Enquirer Building

Lockwood, Greene & Company was an American engineering firm. It was active under various names from 1871 to 2017.

== History ==
=== Lockwood, Greene & Company ===
The firm that would become Lockwood, Greene & Company was established in 1871 in Boston as the mechanical engineering practice of Amos D. Lockwood. Lockwood, a native of Rhode Island, was self-trained in mechanical engineering and had extensive experience managing textile manufacturing and construction operations. Extenuating circumstances obligated him to move his residence to Providence in 1873 to manage his manufacturing interests.

His office remained in Boston until 1875, when he relocated it to Providence, where he established A. D. Lockwood & Company to manage all of his business interests. His partner was John W. Danielson, his son-in-law, who had at least fifteen years of similar experience. In 1879 Lockwood hired the engineer Stephen Greene, (Note: Stephen Greene was born September 27, 1851, in Hope, Rhode Island, to Alvin and Maria (Arnold) Greene. His father was a mill operative and superintendent. He was raised in mill villages in Rhode Island and Maine, and educated at home and in the district schools. Greene and his brothers also worked part time in the mills. After leaving the Westerly High School he entered Brown University in 1870 to study civil engineering. After leaving Brown in 1873 he joined the office of civil engineer and architect Niles B. Schubarth as junior partner. In 1874 he married Schubarth's daughter. In 1875 he moved to the office of mill engineer David M. Thompson, and was superintendent of construction for the new Elizabeth Mill at Hillsgrove in 1876. After his first son was born he returned to Providence to work for Lockwood.) formerly associated with civil engineers Niles B. Schubarth and David M. Thompson. March 1, 1882, a new partnership was organized between Lockwood, Danielson and Greene, known as Lockwood, Greene & Company. Lockwood died January 16, 1884, in Providence. In 1886 Greene moved to Newburyport to be closer to the firm's business interests. In 1889 Danielson retired, selling his interest to Greene. The following January Greene moved the office to Boston, where it would remain. Lockwood, Greene & Company was incorporated January 1, 1901, in Massachusetts. Stephen Greene was the first president, and Frank E. Shedd the first vice president. Stephen Greene died unexpectedly November 7, 1901, at his home in Newton Center, where he had lived since relocating in 1890. (Note: Greene's family home, built in 1892, still stands at 1038 Centre Street.) His eldest son, Edwin Farnham Greene, was elected president in January, 1902. (Note: Edwin Farnham Greene was born February 9, 1879, in Hillsgrove, Rhode Island. He graduated from Worcester Academy in 1897 and Brown University in 1901. He died December 7, 1956 in New York.)

In 1892 George W. Stevens, former engineer for the Amoskeag Manufacturing Company of Manchester, New Hampshire, was hired as general superintendent of construction for southern work. When Stevens died in 1897, (Note: Stevens died in Cordova, Alabama, where he was superintending the construction of the Indian Head Mills.) Joseph Emory Sirrene of Greenville, South Carolina, was hired as his replacement the following year. In 1899, when a southern office was established, it was established at Greenville under Sirrene's direction.

The first twenty years of Edwin F. Greene's presidency was a period of major growth of the company. Lockwood, Greene & Company had established its first branch office in 1899, at Greenville, South Carolina, to serve as the firm's southern office. This was followed by a third office in Chicago in 1911, and in 1912 the southern office was relocated to Atlanta and the Boston office was moved into the new First National Bank Annex at 60 State Street, (Note: Designed by R. Clipston Sturgis.) taking three full floors of the new building. In 1913 offices were added in Montreal and New York. In 1919, after the close of World War I, offices were added at Cleveland, Detroit and Paris, the latter to manage reconstruction work. In 1920, offices were added at Charlotte and Philadelphia. In 1923, the southern headquarters was moved from Atlanta to Spartanburg, though the Atlanta office was retained.

=== Lockwood, Greene & Company Inc. ===
In 1915, Greene organized a new Lockwood, Greene & Company Inc., with four subsidiary companies: Lockwood, Greene & Company, engineers, for design and construction; Lockwood, Greene & Company, managers, for management of manufacturing facilities owned or leased by the firm; Lockwood, Greene & Company of Canada Ltd. for foreign work; and the Greelock Company, a holding company for mill securities.

In 1918 Frank W. Reynolds, an employee since 1885 and head of the drafting room since the 1890s, encouraged the establishment of an architectural department. To lead this, in early 1919 Walter W. Cook was hired. (Note: Walter W. Cook was formerly an employee of twelve years of Shepley, Rutan & Coolidge and project manager for the United States Housing Corporation. He died in 1968 in Dallas.) This new department was in charge of exterior design in collaboration with the firm's other engineers.

=== Lockwood Greene Engineers Inc. ===
In the 1920s, textile manufacturing revenues declined in New England and elsewhere, leaving the firm in a precarious financial condition. In early 1926, with the company under the control of a creditor's committee, the engineering and management subsidiaries were dissolved, their assets merged with those of the parent company. Edwin F. Greene stepped down as president, and Albert L. Scott, (Note: Albert Lyon Scott was born June 21, 1879, in Cleveland, Ohio, and died March 2, 1946, in Chappaqua, New York.) chairman of the former engineering subsidiary, succeeded him. Several branch offices were closed. These changes proved to be insufficient, and conditions worsened. By 1928, only the engineering department was generating a profit. As a result of these realities, in 1928 the firm was again reorganized. A new holding company, Building Engineers Inc., was formed by the directors, to which the engineering department sold. This new organization was then named Lockwood Greene Engineers Inc. Within a month, Lockwood, Greene & Company gave up management of its remaining mills, effective October 1, 1928, leaving the old firm solely a holding company for mill securities. Additionally, at this time the New York office was designated headquarters in place of Boston.

In the reorganization the architectural department was merged with the engineers, and Walter W. Cook and his chief assistant George F. Blount left to establish their own firm, known as Cook & Blount, in New York. Their work was part of the architecture event in the art competition at the 1928 Summer Olympics.

After the death of Scott in 1946 his replacement as president was Chester S. Allen. (Note: Chester Salisbury Allen was born November 25, 1881 in Massachusetts. He joined Lockwood, Greene & Company as an engineer in 1910. He died January 6, 1952, in Auburndale, Massachusetts.) In 1949 Allen was succeeded by Samuel B. Lincoln. (Note: Samuel Bicknell Lincoln was born May 14, 1882, in Blackstone, Massachusetts. He joined Lockwood, Greene & Company in 1906. He died February 19, 1984, in West Harwich, Massachusetts.) William J. Heiser was elected president in 1955, (Note: William J. Heiser was born x in x. He died in 1976 in Garden City, New York.) J. Robert Potter in 1961, (Note: John Robert Potter was born September 29, 1908 and died September 21, 1968.) and H. Morgan Rogers Jr. in 1968. In the decades after World War II, the company once again grew rapidly.

=== Later years ===
In 1973, Morgan moved the headquarters to Spartanburg from New York. In 1981 Lockwood Greene was acquired by Philipp Holzmann AG, a German contractor. In 1982, Donald R. Luger was elected president to succeed Morgan. In January 1999 Holzmann merged Lockwood Greene with J.A. Jones Construction of Charlotte, North Carolina, a property of Holzmann since 1979. The last president of the company was Fred M. Brune, named to that office in June of the same year. Holzmann declared insolvency not long after and was liquidated in 2002. Facing its own problems, Jones declared bankruptcy in 2003, after which Lockwood Greene was sold to CH2M Hill at a cost of $95.5 million. In 2007 the firm was renamed CH2M Hill Engineers. It became CH2M Engineers in 2015, and was folded into Jacobs Engineering Group in 2017 along with the rest of CH2M.

== Legacy ==
A number of its works are listed on the U.S. National Register of Historic Places.

== Works ==
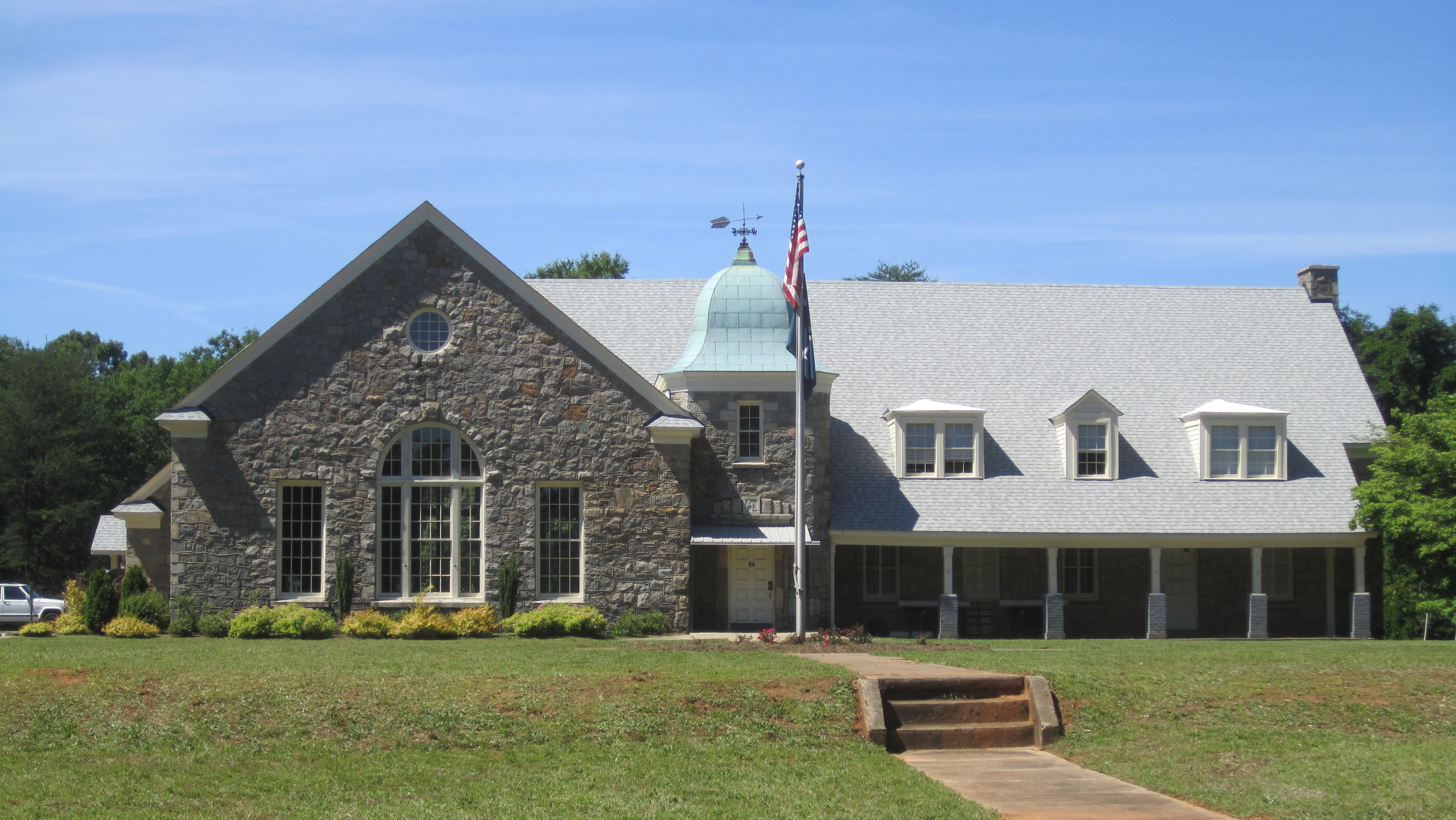
- American Legion Building (1937)
  American Legion Building (built 1937), 94 W. Park Dr. Spartanburg, South Carolina (Lockwood, Greene and Company), NRHP-listed
- Amity Leather Products Company Factory, 723-735 S. Main St. West Bend, Wisconsin (Lockwood Greene), NRHP-listed
- Arlington Mills Historic District, Broadway between Manchester, Stafford and Chase Sts. Lawrence and Methuen, Massachusetts (Lockwood-Green Company), NRHP-listed
- Athenaeum Press (built 1895), 215 1st St. Cambridge, Massachusetts (Lockwood,Greene,& Co.), NRHP-listed
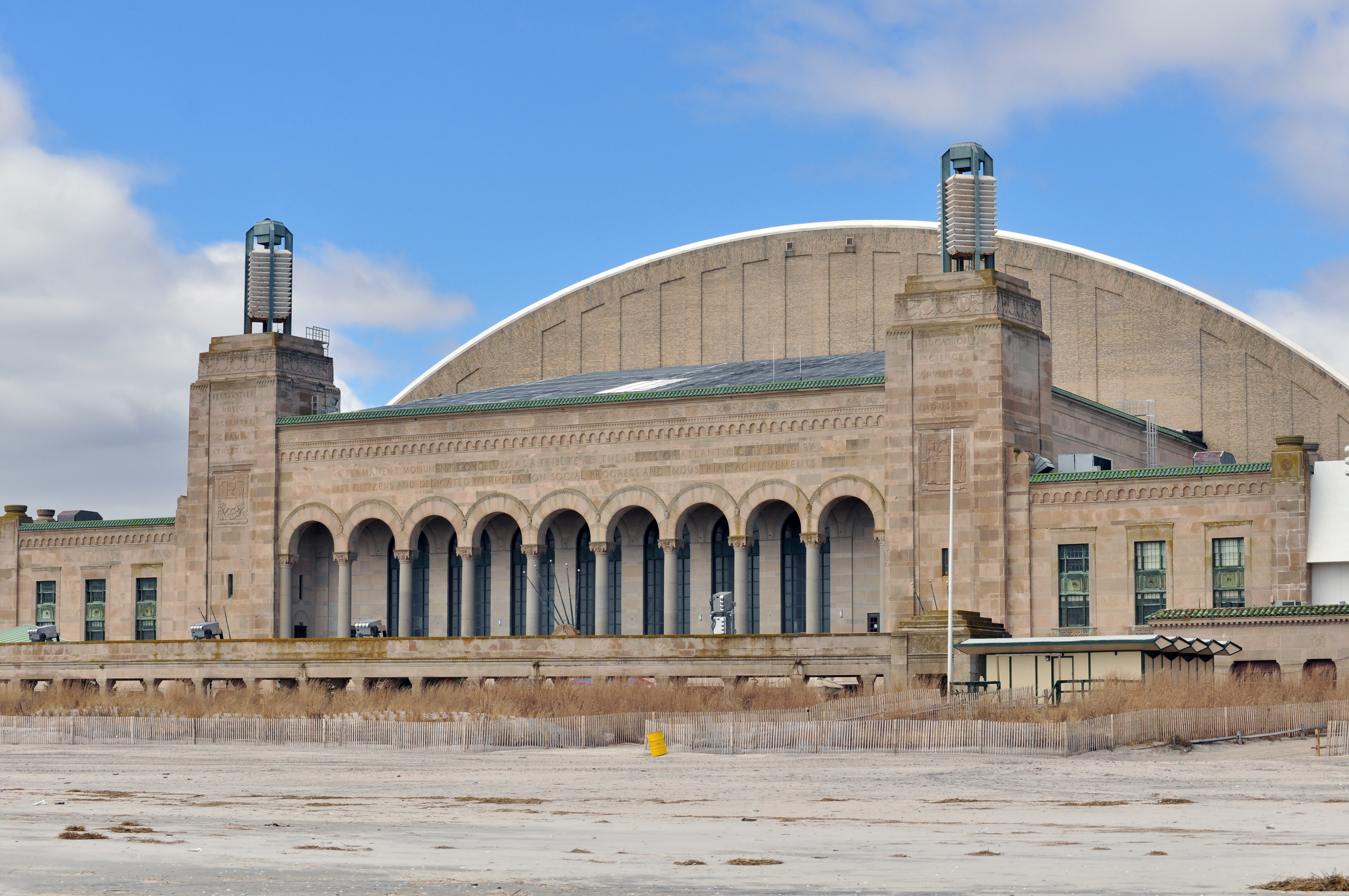
- Atlantic City Convention Hall, 1929
  Atlantic City Convention Hall, Georgia and Mississippi Aves. and the Boardwalk Atlantic City, New Jersey (Lockwood-Greene & Co.), NRHP-listed
- Charlotte Supply Company Building, 500 S. Mint St. Charlotte, North Carolina (Lockwood, Green & Co.), NRHP-listed
- Cincinnati Enquirer Building (built 1926), 617 Vine St. Cincinnati, Ohio (Lockwood Greene & Co.), NRHP-listed
- Columbia Mills Building, on the Congaree River, Columbia, South Carolina (Lockwood, Greene & Co.), NRHP-listed
- Dallas Mill, 701 Dallas Ave., Huntsville, Alabama (Lockwood & Greene), NRHP-listed
- Dan River Mill No. 8 (Boundary Increase), 424 Memorial Dr. Danville, Virginia (Lockwood, Greene & Company), NRHP-listed
- Dobson Mills, 4001-4041 Ridge Ave.; 33502-3530 Scott's La. Philadelphia, Pennsylvania (Lockwood, Greene & Co.), NRHP-listed
- One or more works in Lawton Mills Historic District, Roughly bounded by Second St., Railroad Ave., Norwich Rd. and Fifth and Ninth Sts. Plainfield, Connecticut (Lockwood, Green), NRHP-listed
- Life Savers Building, N. Main St., Port Chester, New York (Lockwood, Greene & Co.), NRHP-listed
- One or more works in Loray Mill Historic District, Roughly bounded by W. Franklin Blvd., S. Vance and S. Trenton Sts., and W. 6th Ave. B Gastonia, North Carolina (Lockwood, Greene and Co.), NRHP-listed
- One or more works in Merrimack Mill Village Historic District, Alpine St., Triana Blvd., Dunn Dr., Cobb Rd., Drake Ave., & Grote St. Huntsville, Alabama (Lockwood Greene Co.), NRHP-listed
- Monaghan Mill, 201 Smythe St. Greenville, South Carolina (Lockwood, Greene & Co.), NRHP-listed
- New England Confectionery Company Factory, 250 Massachusetts Ave. Cambridge, Massachusetts (Lockwood, Greene & Co.), NRHP-listed
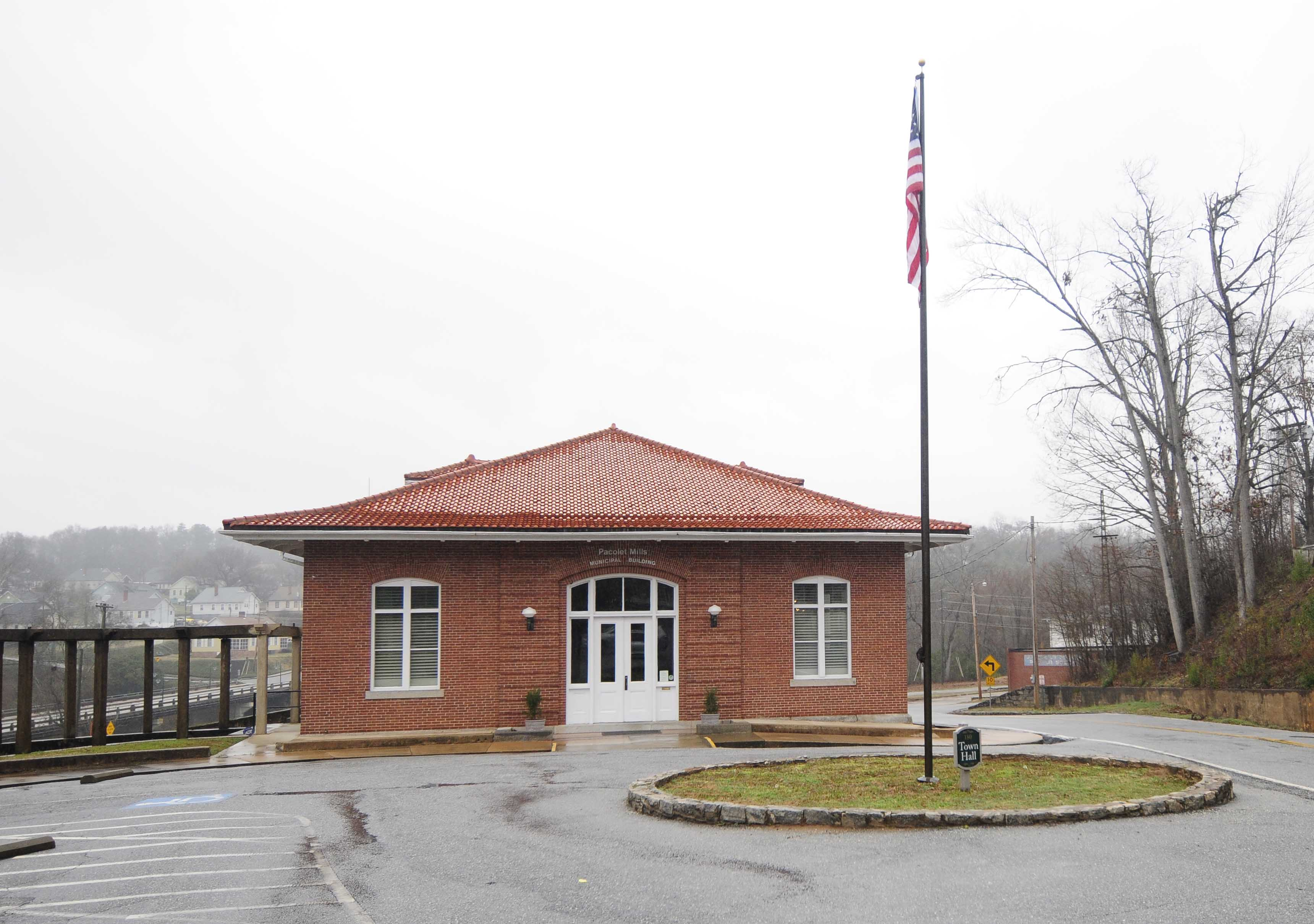
- Pacolet Mill Office, 1908
  Pacolet Mill Office, 180 Montgomery Ave. Pacolet, South Carolina (Lockwood, Greene & Co.), NRHP-listed
- Pelzer Mill Buildings 1-4 in Pelzer, South Carolina (Lockwood, Greene & Co.), destroyed
- Sacco-Pettee Machine Shops, 156 Oak St. Newton, Massachusetts (Lockwood, Greene & Co.), NRHP-listed
- Savona Mill, 528 S. Turner St. Charlotte, North Carolina (Lockwood, Greene & Co.), NRHP-listed
- One or more works in Shawmut Historic District, Roughly bounded by 25th Blvd., 29th Blvd., 20th Ave., 35th St., and 38th Blvd. Valley, Alabama (Lockwood, Greene & Company), NRHP-listed
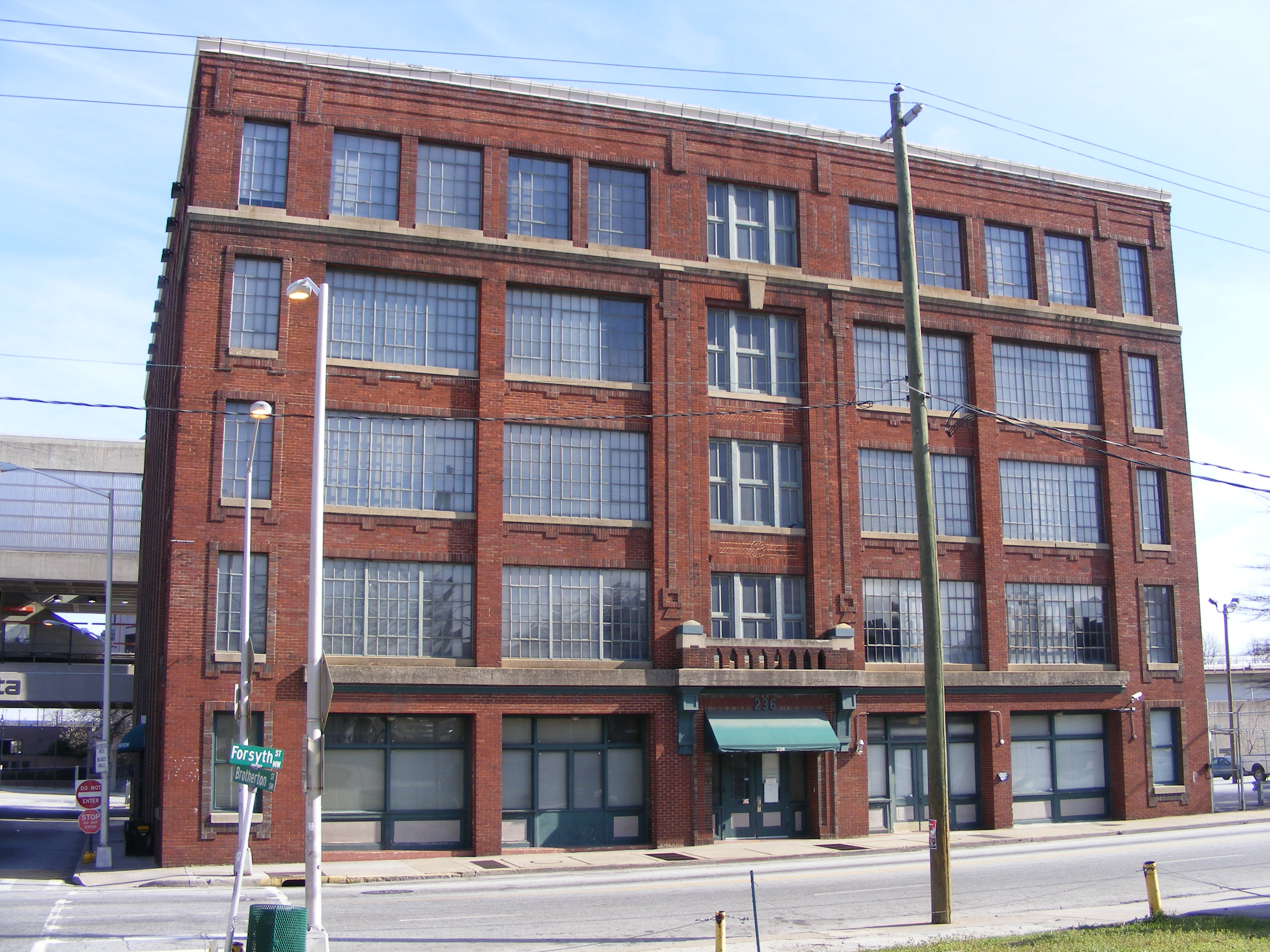
- Southern Belting Company Building, 1915
  Southern Belting Company Building, 236 Forsyth St., SW Atlanta, Georgia (Lockwood, Greene & Co.), NRHP-listed
- One or more works in Stark Mill and Mill Village Historic District, Roughly bounded by Lincoln, Askew, Church, Keith, and Brazil Sts, Whaley Ave. and the Hogansville city limits Hogansville, Georgia (Lockwood, Greene & Co.), NRHP-listed
- Structural Science Building, Clemson University Clemson, South Carolina (Lockwood, Green and Company), NRHP-listed
- Joseph Sykes Brothers Company Building, 1445 S. Mint St. Charlotte, North Carolina (Lockwood, Greene and Company), NRHP-listed
- Textile Mill Supply Company Building, 1300 S. Mint St. Charlotte, North Carolina (Lockwood-Green & Co.), NRHP-listed
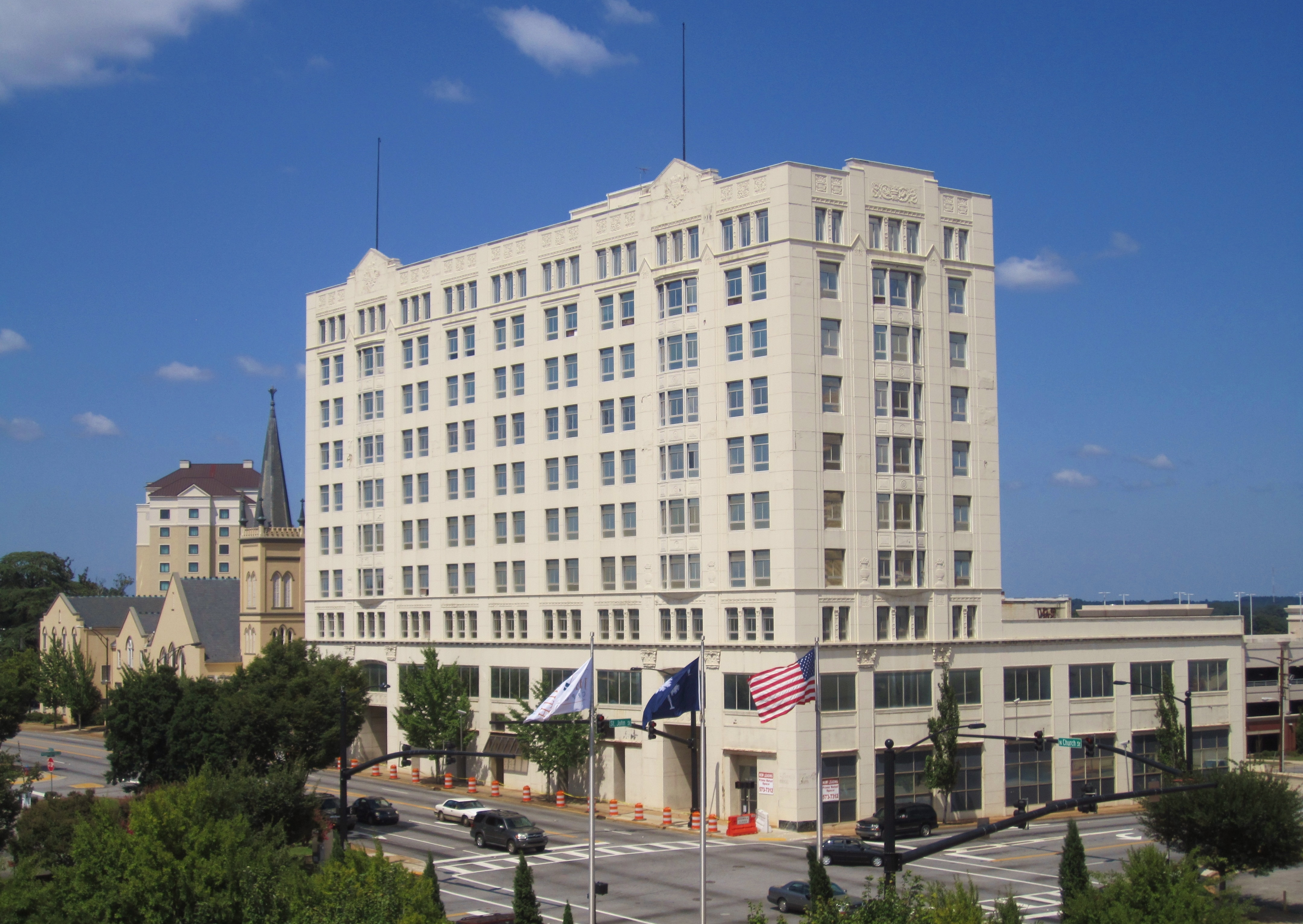
- Montgomery Building, 1924
  Montgomery Building, Spartanburg, South Carolina, NRHP-listed
- Frank Evans High School, Spartanburg, South Carolina, NRHP-listed
- Drayton Mill, Spartanburg, South Carolina, NRHP-listed

== See also ==
- Boardwalk Hall built 1926
- New England Confectionery Company Factory
- Life Savers Building built 1920
- Saco-Pettee Machine Shops built 1893
- South Carolina State Museum, built 1893
- Larkin Terminal Warehouse
