= Joseph Sykes =

Joseph Sykes may refer to:

- Joseph Sykes Brothers Company Building, a historic factory building located at Charlotte, Mecklenburg County, North Carolina.
- Joseph Sykes Rymer, merchant and former Lord Mayors of York
- Joseph Sykes, merchant of Hull, see Sykes family of Sledmere
