= Monaghan Mill =

- U.S. National Register of Historic Places
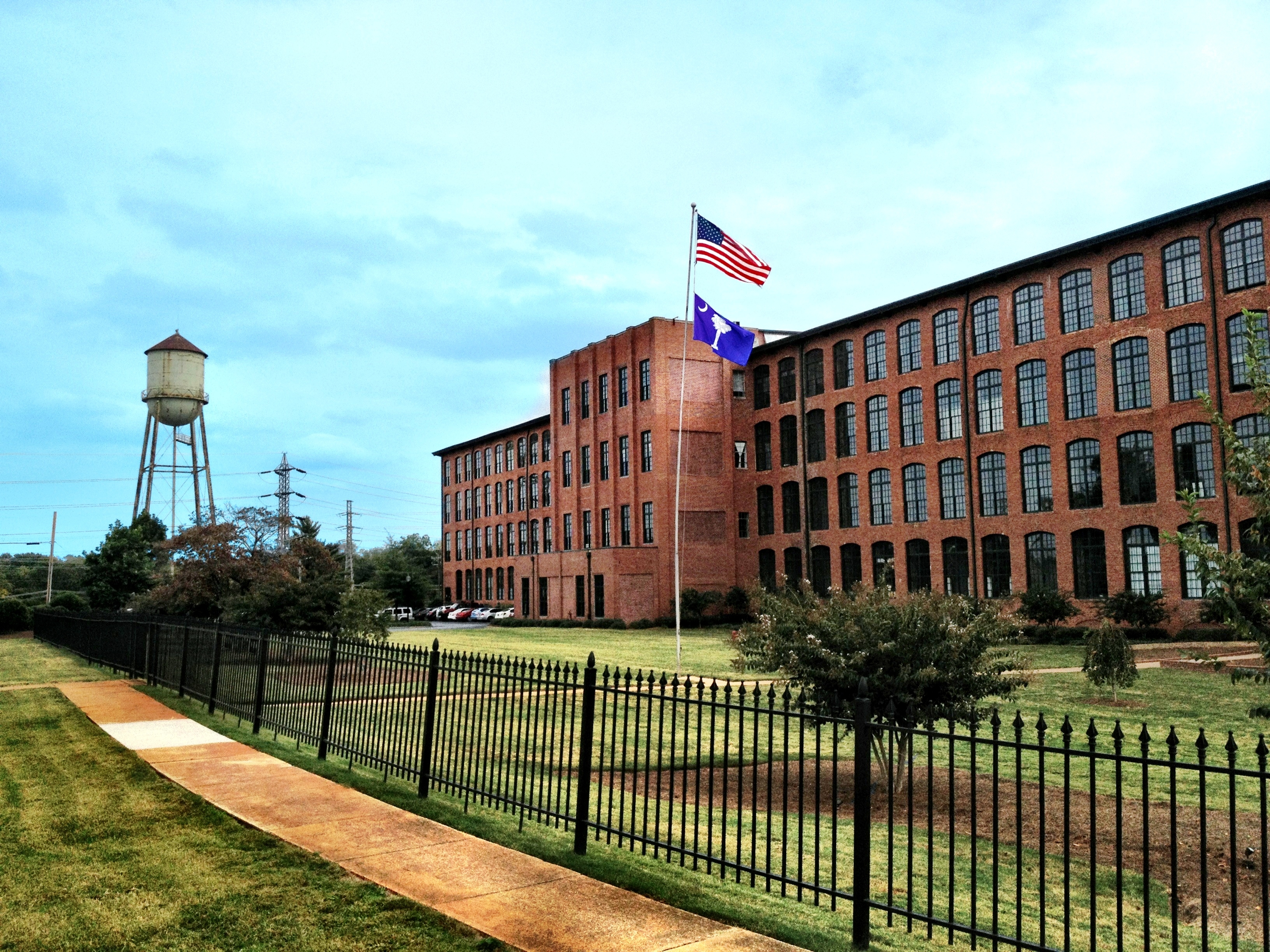
- Monaghan Mill, 2012
- Interactive map of Monaghan Mill
- Location: 201 Smythe Street, Greenville, South Carolina
- Coordinates: 34°52′0″N 82°25′27″W
- Area: 16.8 acres (6.8 ha)
- Built: 1900–02
- Architect: Lockwood, Greene & Co.
- NRHP reference No.: 05001159
- Added to NRHP: October 4, 2005

Monaghan Mill, now the Lofts of Greenville, is a former textile mill (1900–2001) in Greenville, South Carolina, that in the early 21st century was converted into loft apartments. The building is listed on the National Register of Historic Places.

== Founding ==
Monaghan Mill was founded by Lewis Wardlaw Parker (1865–1916) and his cousin, Thomas Fleming Parker (1860–1926). Lewis Parker was born in Abbeville, South Carolina, and graduated from the College of South Carolina in 1885, and from its law school two years later. After teaching in Columbia, he practiced law in Greenville and there became president of the Bank of Greer. Thomas Fleming Parker was born in Charleston and attended the College of Charleston before moving to Greenville, where his father held shares in a group of cotton mills.

Because the Bank of Greer was the receiver for the Victor Manufacturing Company, in 1897, Lewis Parker reorganized it as well as the Whaley Mills of Columbia. In February 1900, Parker and his cousin Thomas organized Monaghan Mill and named it for County Monaghan, the birthplace of their grandfather Thomas Fleming. The Rhode Island firm of Lockwood, Greene & Co. built the mill, which opened in 1902 on 325 acres on the west side of Greenville near the Reedy River. The mill was capitalized at $450,000 and had 35,000 spindles.

Monaghan was successful from the beginning, producing "print cloths, fancy dress goods and shirtings," and "shade cloth." By 1907, Monaghan had increased its spindles to 60,000 and the capital in stock alone had increased to $700,000. The surge in textile manufacturing drew workers from other states and Europe to Greenville. For instance, Monaghan employed fifty Belgian immigrants, who lived at one of the mill's boarding houses.

In 1911, the Parker cousins merged the Victor and Whaley Mills, which they already owned, with the Olympia, Richland, Granby, and Capital City Mills of Columbia, and the Appalache Mills of Greer, to form the Parker Cotton Mills Company, which was capitalized at $15 million and operated over a million spindles, more than any other contemporary U.S. textile firm. The company collapsed in 1914 because of a lack of capital during a cotton panic that occurred at the outbreak of World War I. Lewis resigned the presidency of the company and practiced law until his death from cancer in 1916. Thomas eventually retired. The first successful cotton mill merger did not occur for another twenty years. In 1917, the former Parker mills were reorganized into the Victor-Monaghan Group, and were sold in 1946 to J. P. Stevens and Company.

== Mill village ==
As president of Monaghan, Thomas Parker strove to make the mill a model of paternalistic management. Parker provided a community medical clinic and hired one of the best doctors in the area, as well as a nurse, to staff it. Parker also provided an elementary school, a playground, and a YMCA. The YMCA building alone cost $18,000 (easily ten times that much a century later) and was the first located in a southern mill town. As a director of the YMCA, Parker hired an unusually gifted young man, Lawrence Peter "Pete" Hollis, who eventually became a nationally recognized educator.

As early as 1904 Monaghan had its own baseball team; and in 1907, Monaghan joined the newly formed Greenville Cotton Mill Baseball League. The Monaghan team provided both recreation and entertainment for workers, and the sense of pride that accompanied identification with a successful sports team increased worker loyalty.

As was typical in the southern textile industry, the Monaghan Mill and its mill village were largely self-sufficient. The mill had its own well, generated its own electricity, and had its own waste disposal collection. The company store sold most goods workers required. There was even a mill church, shared by Baptists and Methodists until those denominations built their own buildings. During the 1920s and 1930s, mill president Thomas Marchant continued the paternalistic management of his predecessors, loaning money to mill workers for causes he deemed worthy and sponsoring social activities such as picnics and festivities on holidays like the Fourth of July.

Monaghan built two kindergartens and an elementary school. Because Greenville High School was overcrowded, charged tuition, and provided no transportation, mill executives lobbied for the creation of a new school district and offered to pay for the school themselves. Despite opposition and a suit that took the issue to the South Carolina Supreme Court, the Parker School District was created by the South Carolina legislature, and Parker High School opened in 1923. Pete Hollis organized the new district and became superintendent.

== Depression, boom, and decline ==
During the Depression demand for textiles fell, and mills lowered wages and laid off workers. During the early 1930s, workers were able to work only three days every two weeks. The Roosevelt Administration hoped to institute a forty-hour week, but Marchant lobbied against the idea, traveling to Washington on multiple occasions to argue that Monaghan would "go plum broke on forty hours a week." Instead, management instituted what textiles workers called the "stretch-out," attempts to increase productivity by having employees work longer and more intensively for no additional pay. Nevertheless, Monaghan Mill continued to operate normally during the national textile workers strike of 1934 after union organizers found the mill gates locked and a troop of National Guardsmen stationed at the gate.

World War II brought increased demand, and Monaghan Mill produced cloth for uniforms. Nevertheless, following the war, its new owner, J. P. Stevens and Co. sold mill village houses as too expensive to maintain. Monaghan School burned down in 1954 and the YMCA was torn down in the late 1960s. Other facilities were closed, remodeled, or eliminated, such as the swimming pool and the baseball diamond.

Federal government intervention, combined with a growing shortage of white labor, helped desegregate the mills during the 1960s. Nevertheless, African-Americans faced resentment and often had difficulty gaining promotions. Many turned to lawsuits and political activism, including multiple actions against J. P. Stevens, challenging its hiring and promotion policies.

An increasingly global market that included cheaper foreign labor made American textile mills increasingly unprofitable. The former Monaghan mill village became more run down as workers left the area; some houses were left vacant and unkempt. In 1983, the Greenville County Redevelopment Authority began renovations, eventually repairing 134 homes, repaving numerous roads, and redeveloping the old Monaghan School site as the Parker Daycare Center.

== Conversion to loft apartments ==
In 1988, Monaghan was sold to JPS Converter and Industrial Group, which operated the mill until its closing in 2001. In 2003, Capitol Development Corporation attempted to have the mill re-zoned for use as an apartment complex, but the Greenville County Council denied the request because of insufficient planning and concern about the flammability of the building. Another development company, Monaghan Mills LLC, purchased the property a year later with similar plans. This time rezoning was approved, and in 2004, the South Carolina legislature passed the Textile Communities Revitalization Act, which added an additional 25% tax credit to the 30–39% credit for buildings listed on the National Register. The $15 million Monaghan development received $10.2 million in tax credits.

The building reopened in October 2006 as The Lofts of Greenville, featuring 190 new, one-to-three bedroom apartment units reflecting the original industrial design of the mill through the "open floor plans, soaring . . . ceilings, exposed brick walls and pine beams, stained concrete and wood floors, arched windows, and exposed duct work." The facilities also included a fitness center, theater, pool, community garden, stocked ponds, fenced dog park, fire pits and charcoal grills, as well as hiking trails connected to the Swamp Rabbit Trail.

In October 2005, Monaghan Mill was added to the National Register of Historic Places as an industrial site with an architectural style described as Early Twentieth Century Revival. The property included the former mill, seventeen acres, and the original smokestack, water tower, and pond.

Photographs of the mill, village, and community can be accessed in the Greenville County Library System digital collections.
