= American Legion Building (Spartanburg, South Carolina) =

- U.S. National Register of Historic Places
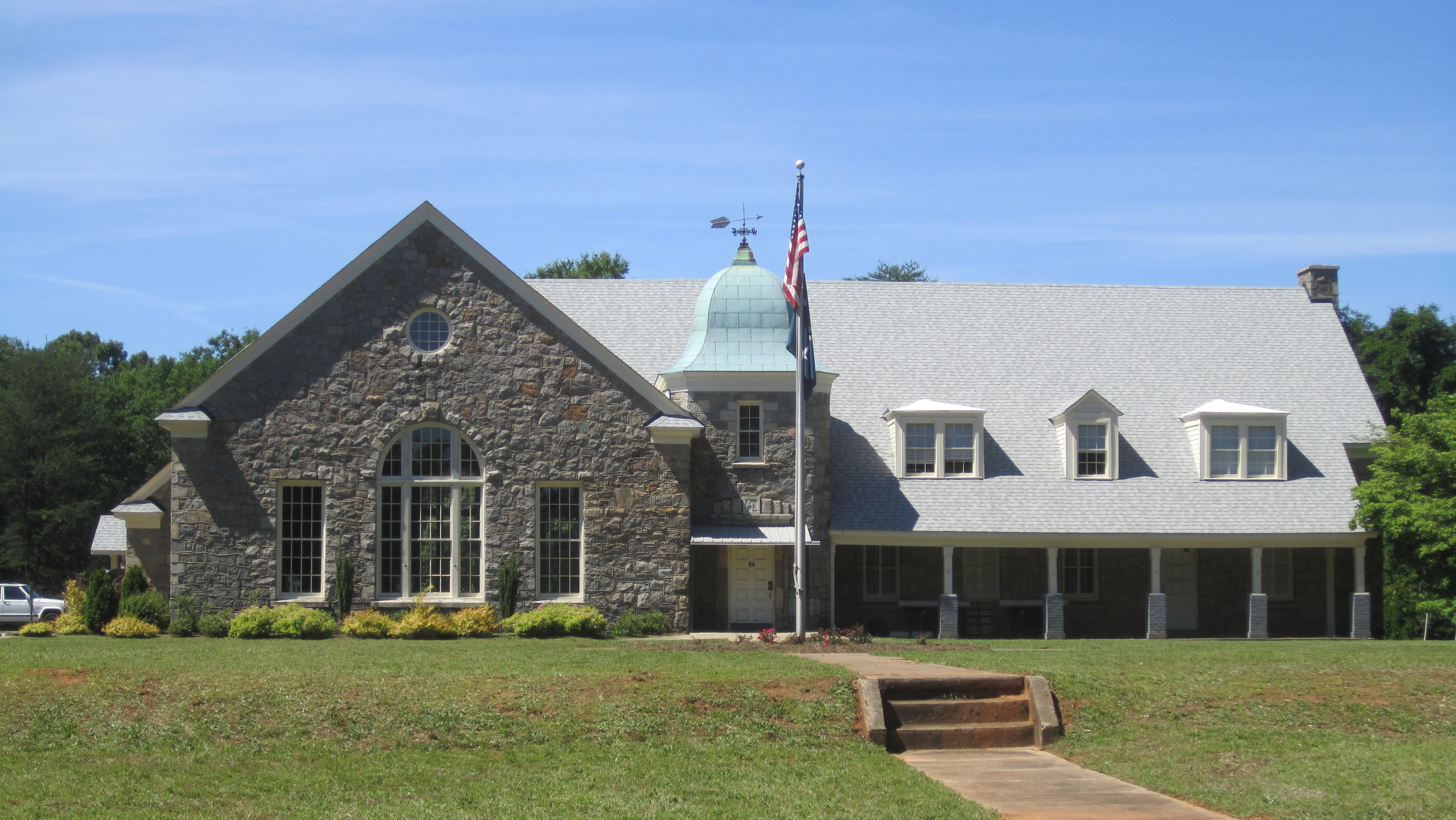

- Location within South Carolina Location within the United States
- Location: 94 W. Park Dr., Spartanburg, South Carolina
- Coordinates: 34°56′3″N 81°54′51″W
- Area: 4.5 acres (1.8 ha)
- Built: 1937
- Architect: Lockwood, Greene and Company
- Architectural style: Colonial Revival
- NRHP reference No.: 03000271
- Added to NRHP: April 18, 2003

The American Legion Building in Spartanburg, South Carolina is a Colonial Revival building that was designed by architects Lockwood, Greene and Company and was built in 1937.

It was listed on the U.S. National Register of Historic Places in 2003.
