= Cincinnati Enquirer Building =

- U.S. National Register of Historic Places
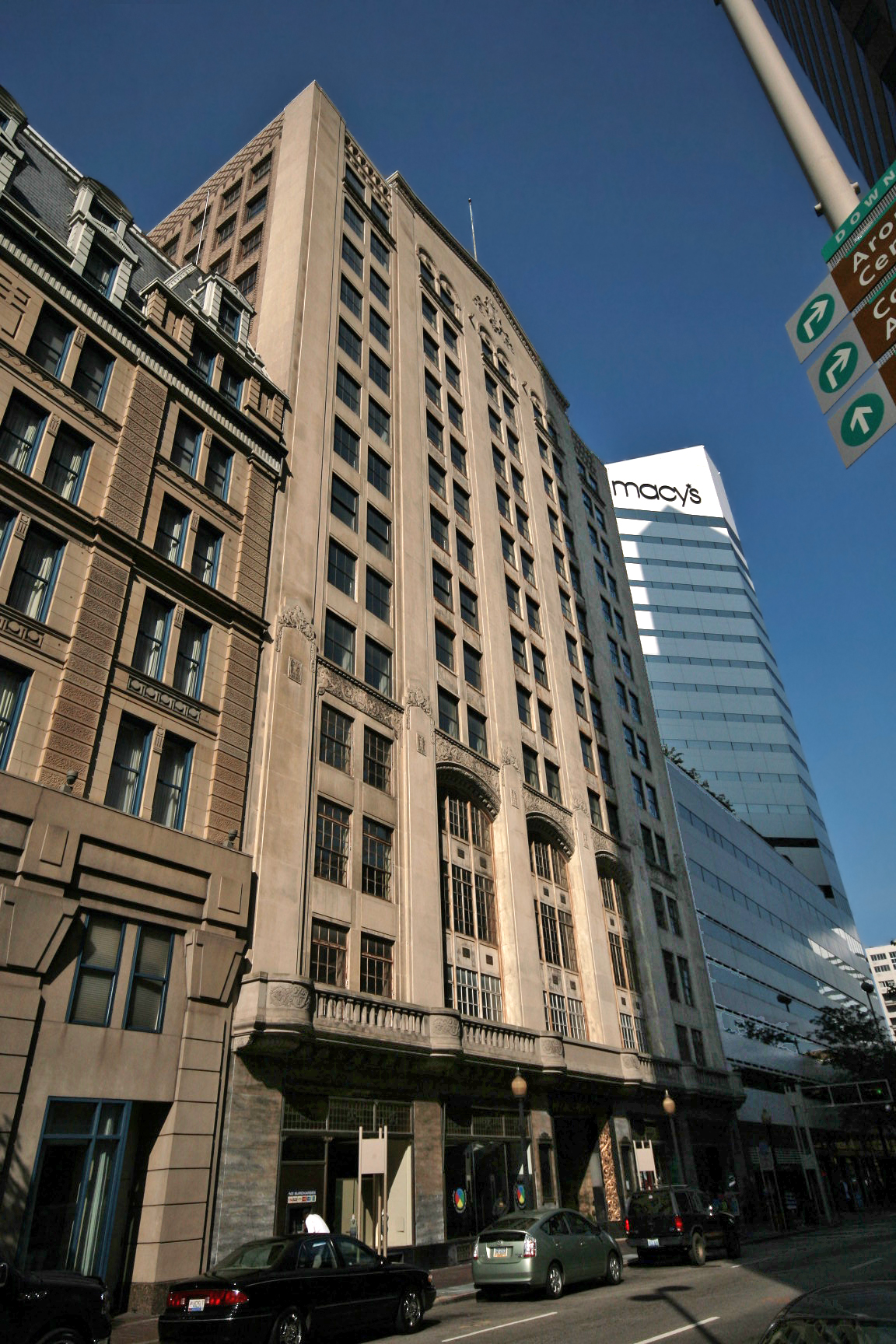
- Front of the building

- Location within Ohio Location within the United States
- Location: 617 Vine St., Cincinnati, Ohio
- Coordinates: 39°6′11″N 84°30′49″W
- Area: 0.3 acres (0.12 ha)
- Built: 1926
- Architect: Lockwood Greene & Co.
- Architectural style: Mixed
- NRHP reference No.: 85002787
- Added to NRHP: November 13, 1985

The Cincinnati Enquirer Building is the former headquarters building of The Cincinnati Enquirer on Vine Street in downtown Cincinnati, Ohio. It was designed by the firm of Lockwood Greene and Company and completed in 1926. The newspaper had been published from premises on the same site since 1866.

Built primarily of limestone, and measuring fourteen stories tall, the Enquirer Building was built to house both commercial offices and publishing facilities. Lockwood Greene's architects designed the building in a mixture of architectural styles; among its most distinctive features include the first-floor storefronts, the recessed central main entrance, and marble stonework with a Christmas tree with bronze details.

The building is shown as the home of WKRP in the 1978-1982 television series WKRP in Cincinnati and its 1991-1993 sequel The New WKRP in Cincinnati. However, the building was referred to as the fictional Osgood R. Flimm Building.

In 1975, the Enquirer Building was listed on the National Register of Historic Places, due to its place in local history and architecture. The newspaper's printing facilities moved to a new property at the intersection of Western Avenue and Liberty Street in 1979, and the offices to 312 Elm Street in 1992.

In 2015, the Cincinnati Enquirer Building was divided into two hotels, each containing over 100 rooms.
