= Montgomery Building (Spartanburg, South Carolina) =

- U.S. National Register of Historic Places
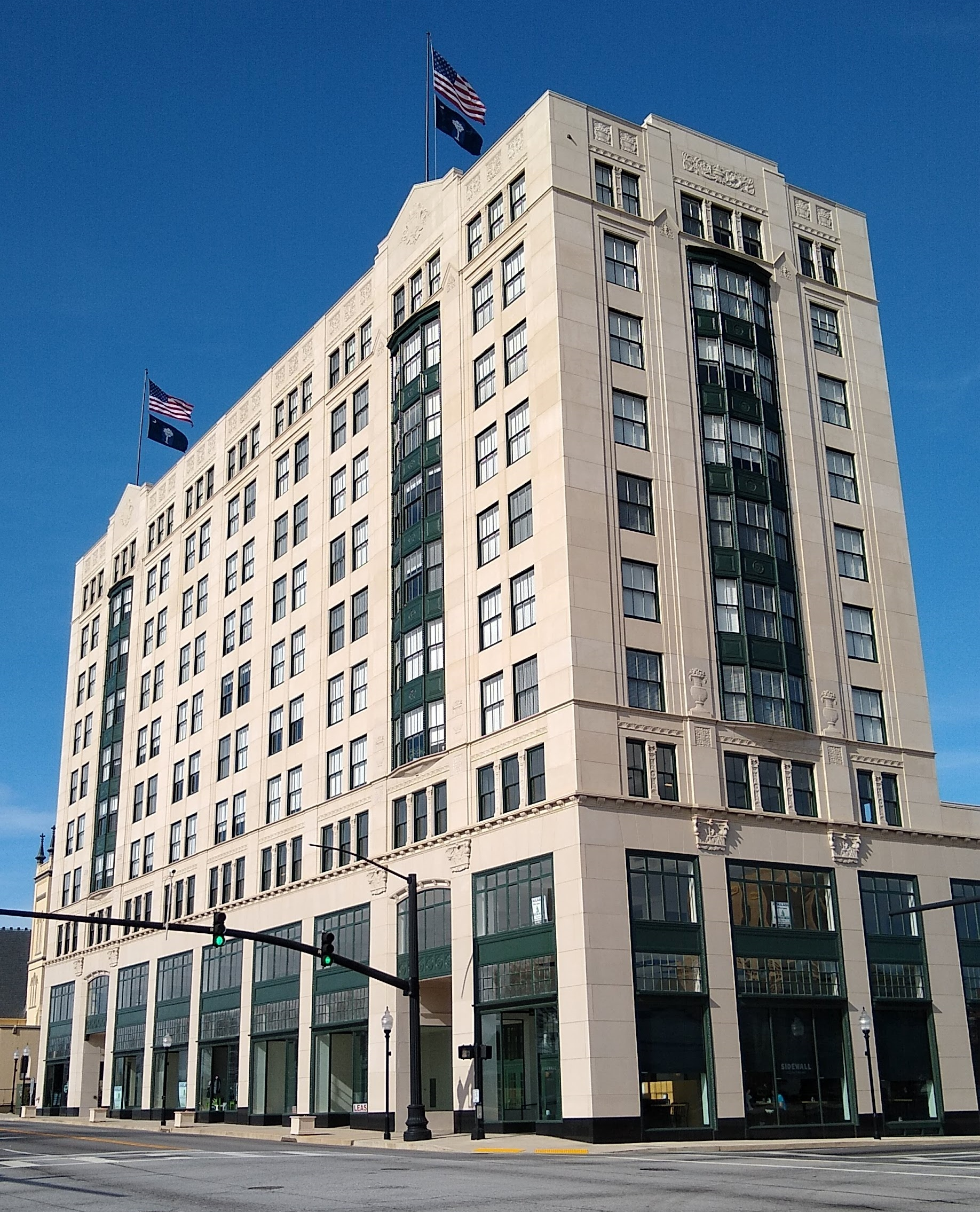
- Montgomery Building in 2020

- Location within South Carolina Location within the United States
- Location: 187 N. Church St., Spartanburg, South Carolina
- Coordinates: 34°57′08″N 81°55′56″W
- Area: 1.55 acres (0.63 ha)
- Built: 1924
- Architect: Lockwood, Greene & Co.
- Architectural style: Chicago School
- NRHP reference No.: 08000760; 100002126 (decrease)

Significant dates
- Added to NRHP: May 25, 2011
- Boundary decrease: February 21, 2018

The Montgomery Building, listed on the National Register of Historic Places, is an iconic building located on Church Street in Spartanburg, Spartanburg County, South Carolina. It was built in 1924, and is a ten-story, nine-bay-wide, steel frame skyscraper faced in precast concrete. It originally housed the offices of textile companies, cotton brokers, and factories. The building also contained a theatre/auditorium space, a radio and television station. The Montgomery Building was the tallest building in Spartanburg until the 1950s. In 2016, a developer announced a $29 million plan to renovate the building for mixed-use to include apartments, offices and retail. Restoration began in Spring 2017 and was completed in December 2018.

== History ==
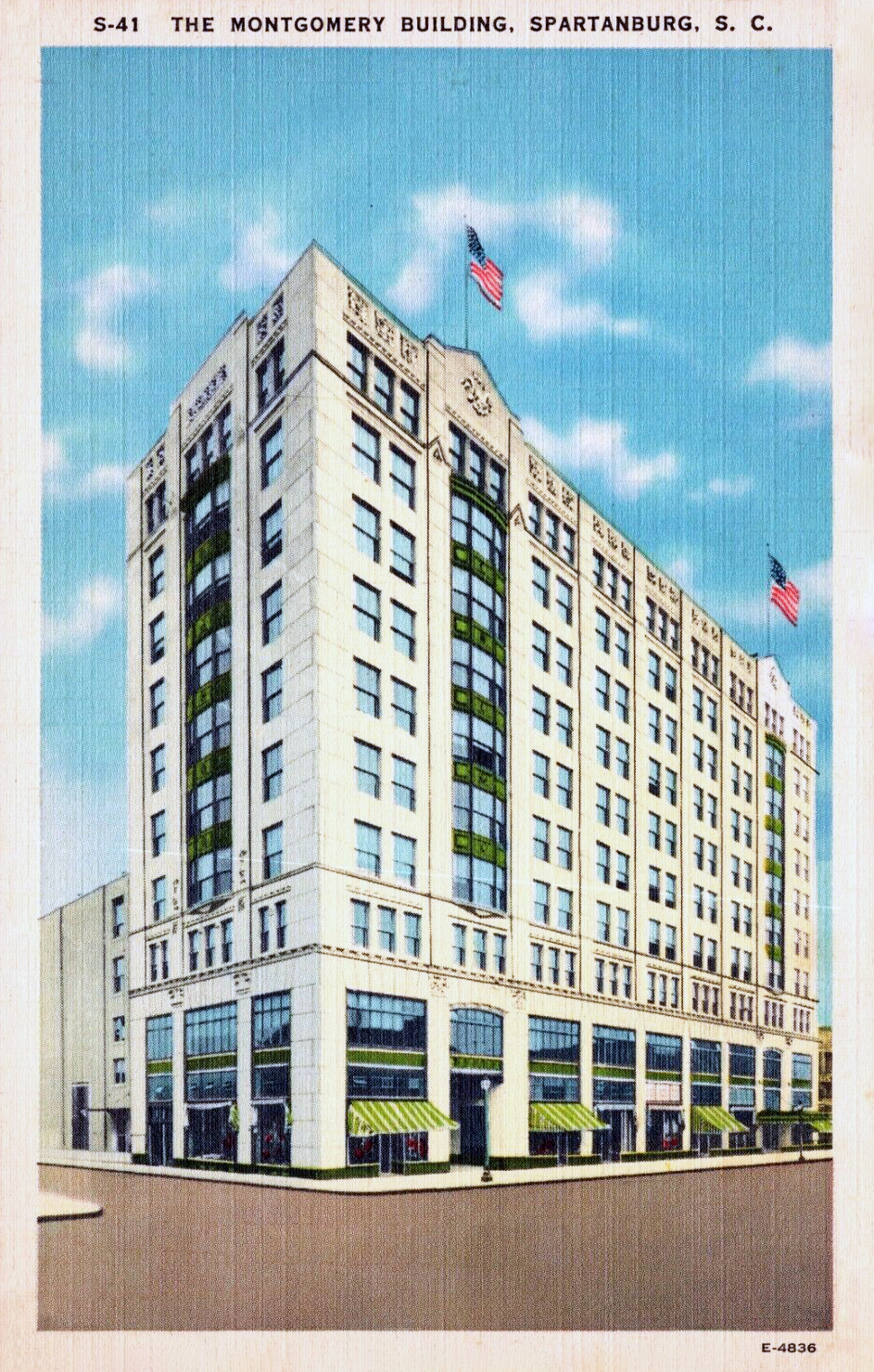
Postcard view of the Montgomery Building, circa 1945

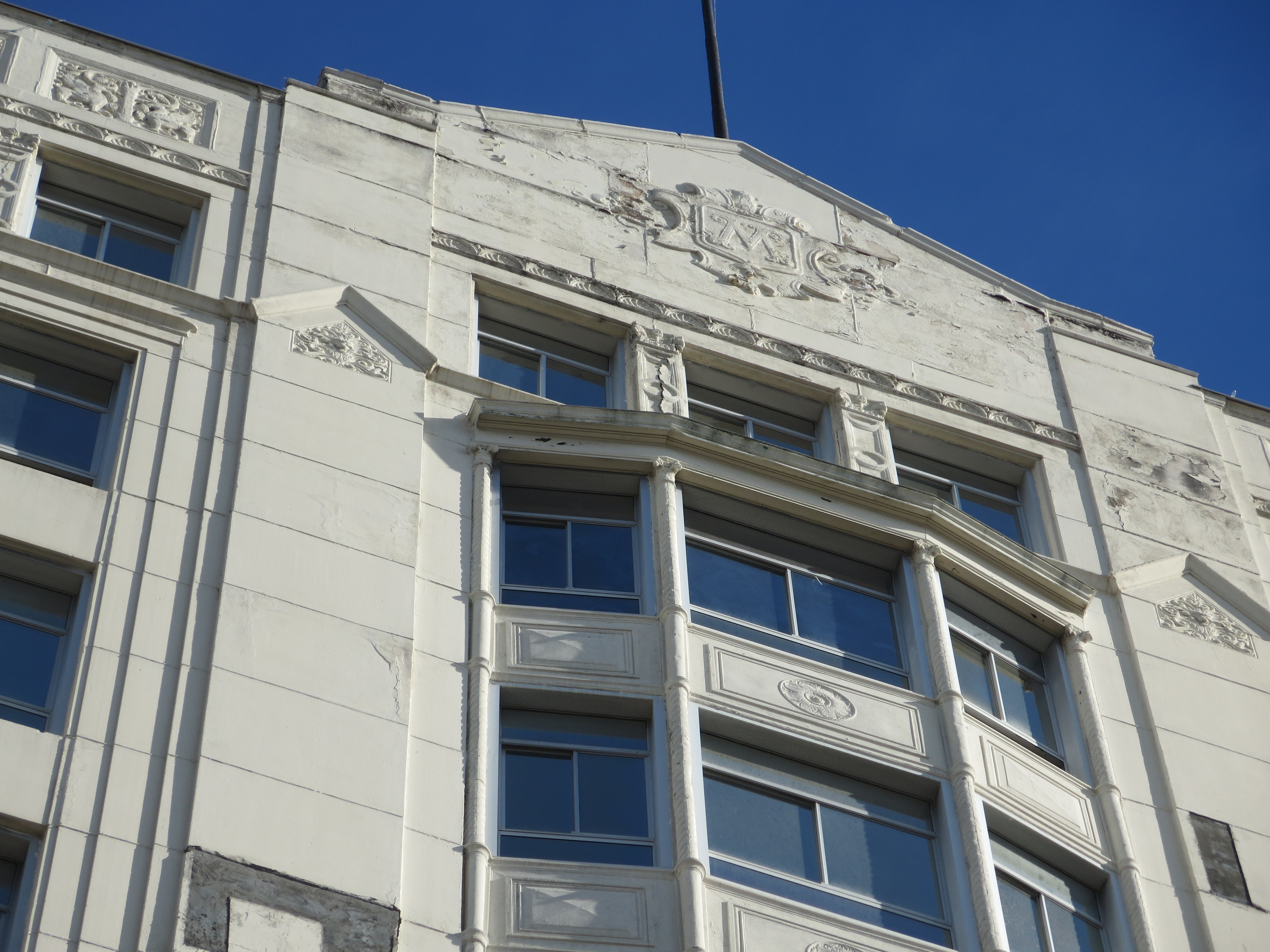
View of an "M" emblem at the top of the Montgomery Building in 2013, prior to renovation.

=== Carolina Theatre ===
The theatre built alongside the office building was originally called the Montgomery Theatre. Including floor seating and two balconies, the theatre seated a total of 1300 patrons. It was the largest theatre in Spartanburg, and hosted a variety of touring musicals, plays, and vaudeville acts. In 1932, the Wilby-Kincey Company took over management and renamed it the Carolina Theatre, installing a dazzling exterior marquee. In addition to stage shows, the Carolina began showing motion pictures and became the city's premier first-run movie theater. In 1956, though now primarily a movie theater, the Carolina hosted a live performance by Elvis Presley. Over the years, the Carolina underwent a series of renovations to "modernize" the interior for moviegoers. A 1970 renovation in particular removed or covered most of the theatre's original architectural details and flourishes. Soon after, the Carolina closed, as audiences now preferred to patronize suburban cinemas and multiplexes.

== Renovation ==
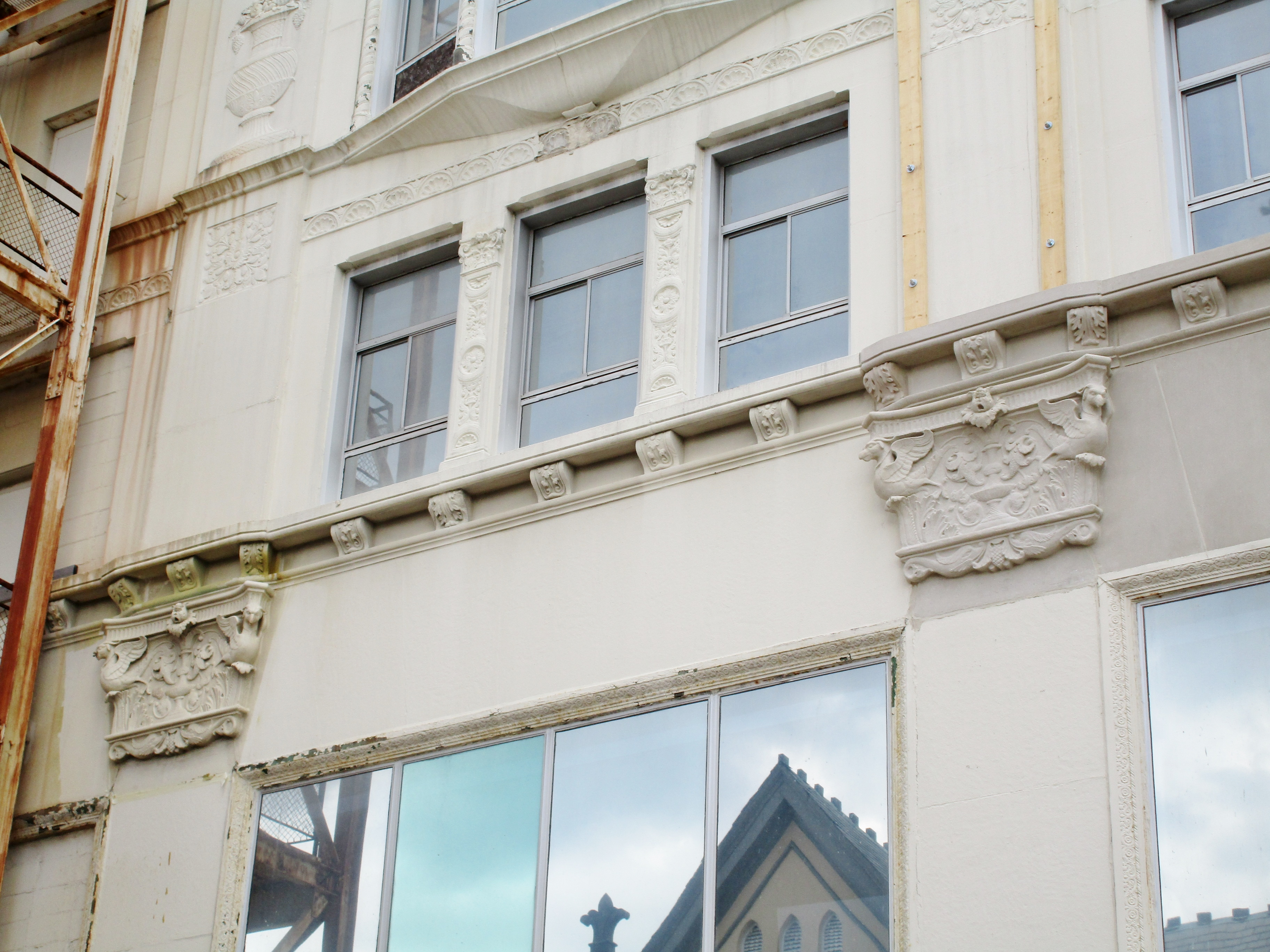
Replica capital (right) compared to original (left)

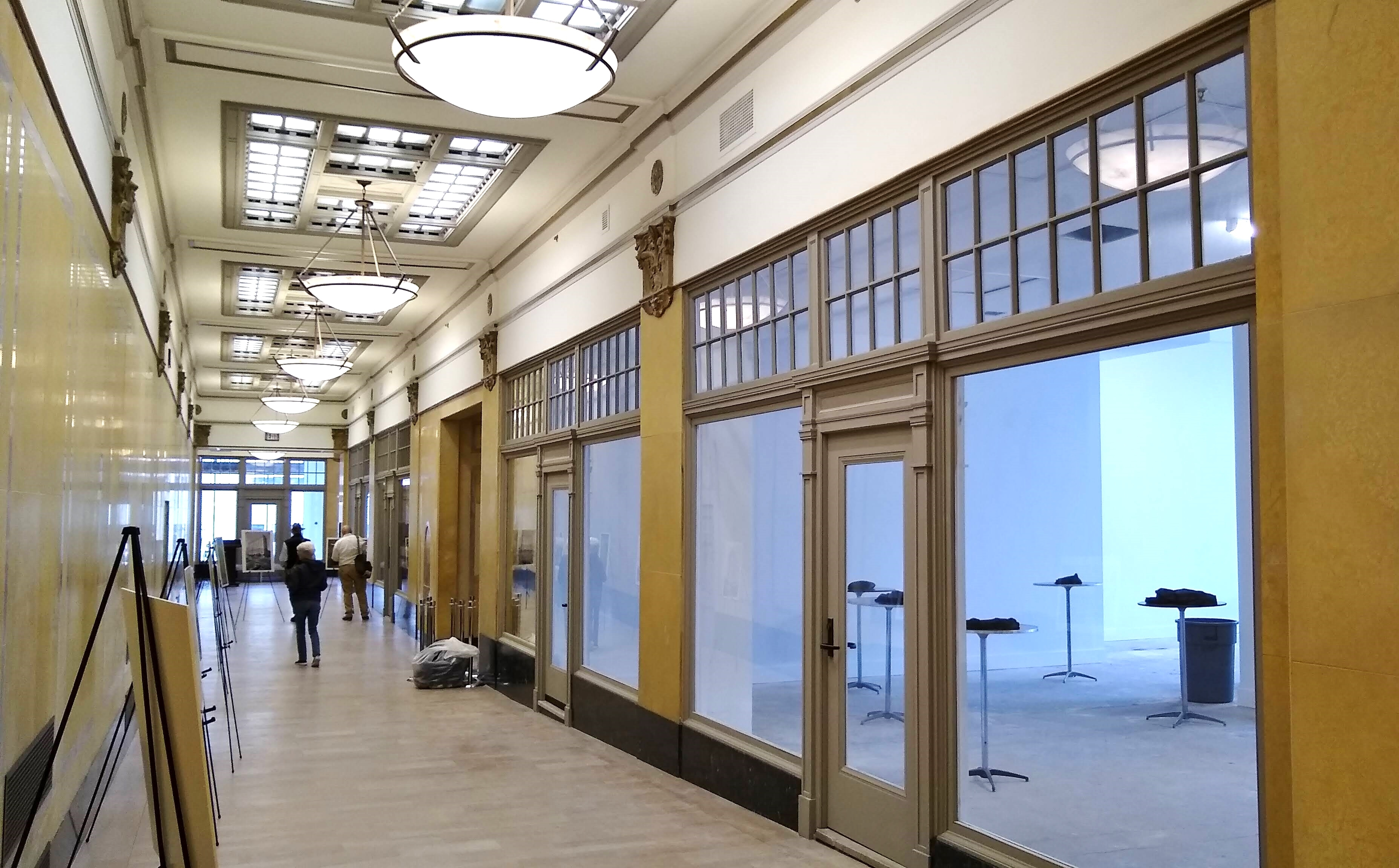
Newly-renovated Montgomery Building arcade in 2018

In 2016, Charleston SC based developers James Bakker and Tom Finnegan(BF Spartanburg LLC) revealed its $29 million plan to renovate the historic building, which it purchased in February 2017 from Florida-based Cypress Lending Group for $680,000.

The plan for this mixed-use project included retail and restaurant space on the ground floor, office space on the second and third floors, and 63 apartment units on the upper seven floors. Residential amenities including a fitness center and storage units were planned the basement, as well as additional office space.

It was a unique renovation project in that the building's thousands of precast concrete exterior panels were replaced with replicated panels made of modern materials and fit to historic standards. The original facade panels were cast using an inferior concrete mix and flawed techniques which, over time, caused the panels to buckle and deteriorate. Molds were made from the original panels, sharpened by an artist to capture all the details, and new panels were created as exact replicas (to historic standards) using the molds.

The developer began renovations on the 10-story building in early 2017 and completed the project in December 2018.

The Carolina Theatre was not part of the renovation project completed in 2018. However, the same developers plan to manage a restoration of the theatre in the coming years. Input from the local community will be sought to determine the end use for the theatre.

The Montgomery Building was listed on the National Register of Historic Places in 2011.

=== Awards and recognition ===
The Montgomery Building's renovation has been recognized with numerous awards, including the 2020 Gignilliat Preservation Award from the Spartanburg County Historical Association; the 2021 Palladio Award for Commercial Adaptive Reuse and/or Sympathetic Addition from Traditional Building Magazine; and the 2021 Preservation Honor Award from Preservation South Carolina, SCDAH, and the Office of the Governor.
