= Southern Belting Company Building =

- Garnett Station Place
- U.S. National Register of Historic Places
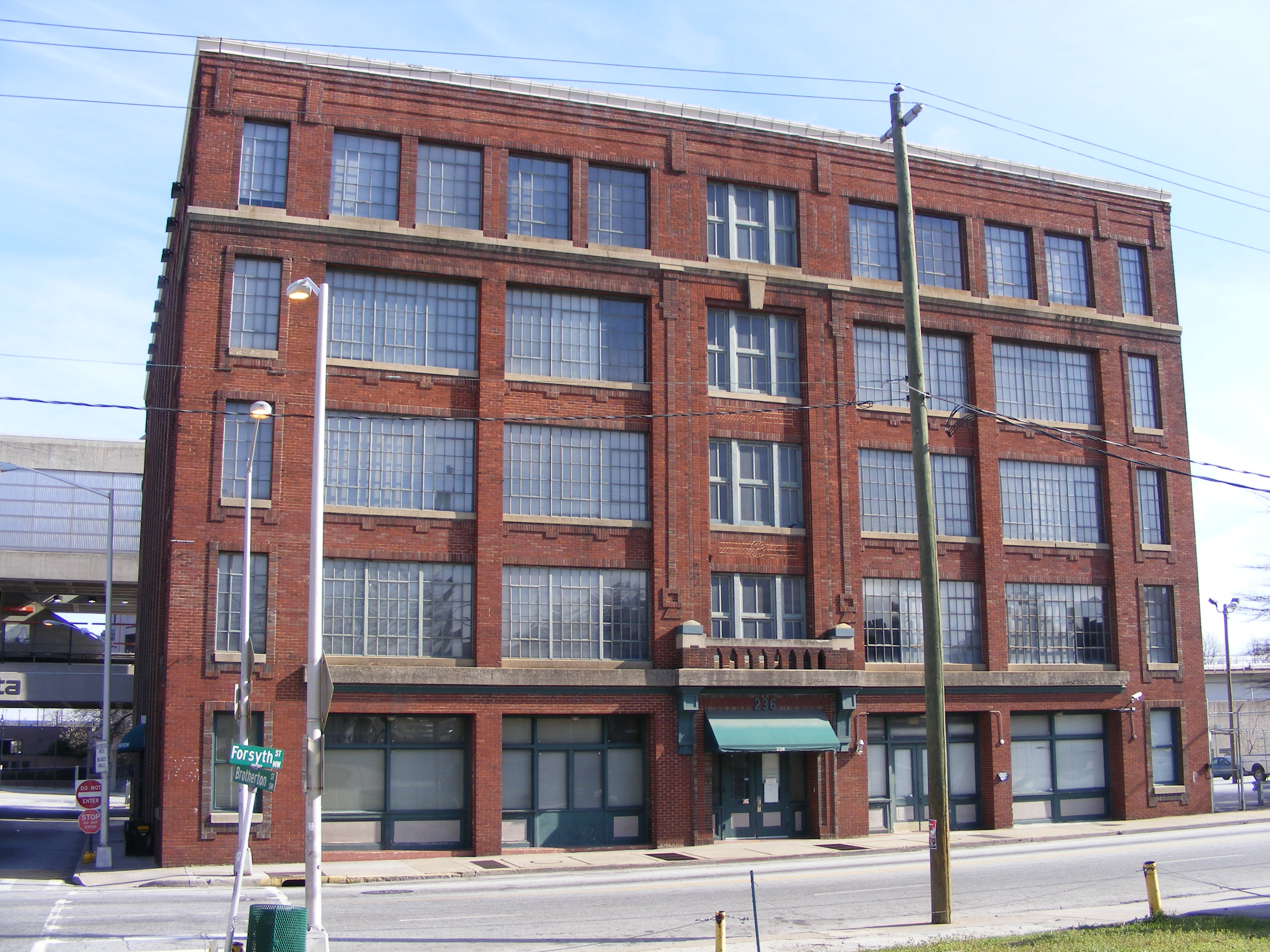
- Front of the building

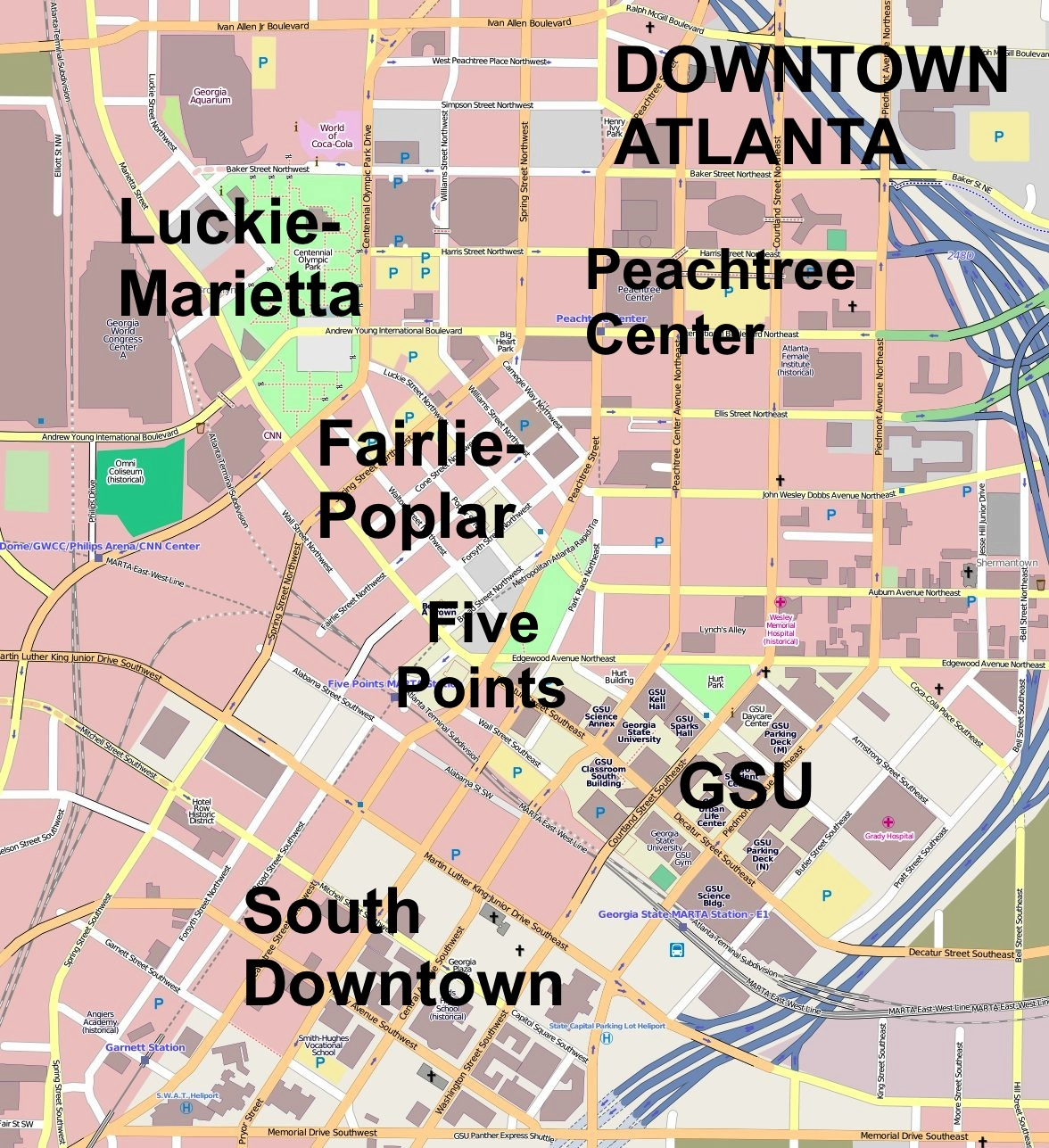
- Location within Downtown Atlanta Location within Atlanta Location within Georgia Location within the United States
- Location: 236 Forsyth St. SW, Atlanta, Georgia
- Coordinates: 33°44′53″N 84°23′48″W
- Area: 0.3381 acres (0.1368 ha)
- Built: 1915
- Architect: Lockwood Greene & Co.
- Architectural style: Mixed
- NRHP reference No.: 88001174
- Added to NRHP: August 10, 1988

Garnett Station Place, also known as the Southern Belting Company Building and the Toshiba Building, is a historic building on Forsyth Street in downtown Atlanta, Georgia. It was designed by the firm of Lockwood Greene and Company and completed in 1915. In 1985 the architectural firm Stang and Newdow (now known as Stevens & Wilkinson) were retained to renovate the building into loft office space. In August 1988 the building was added the National Register of Historic Places.
