= Textile Mill Supply Company Building =

Historic mill in North Carolina, US

- U.S. National Register of Historic Places
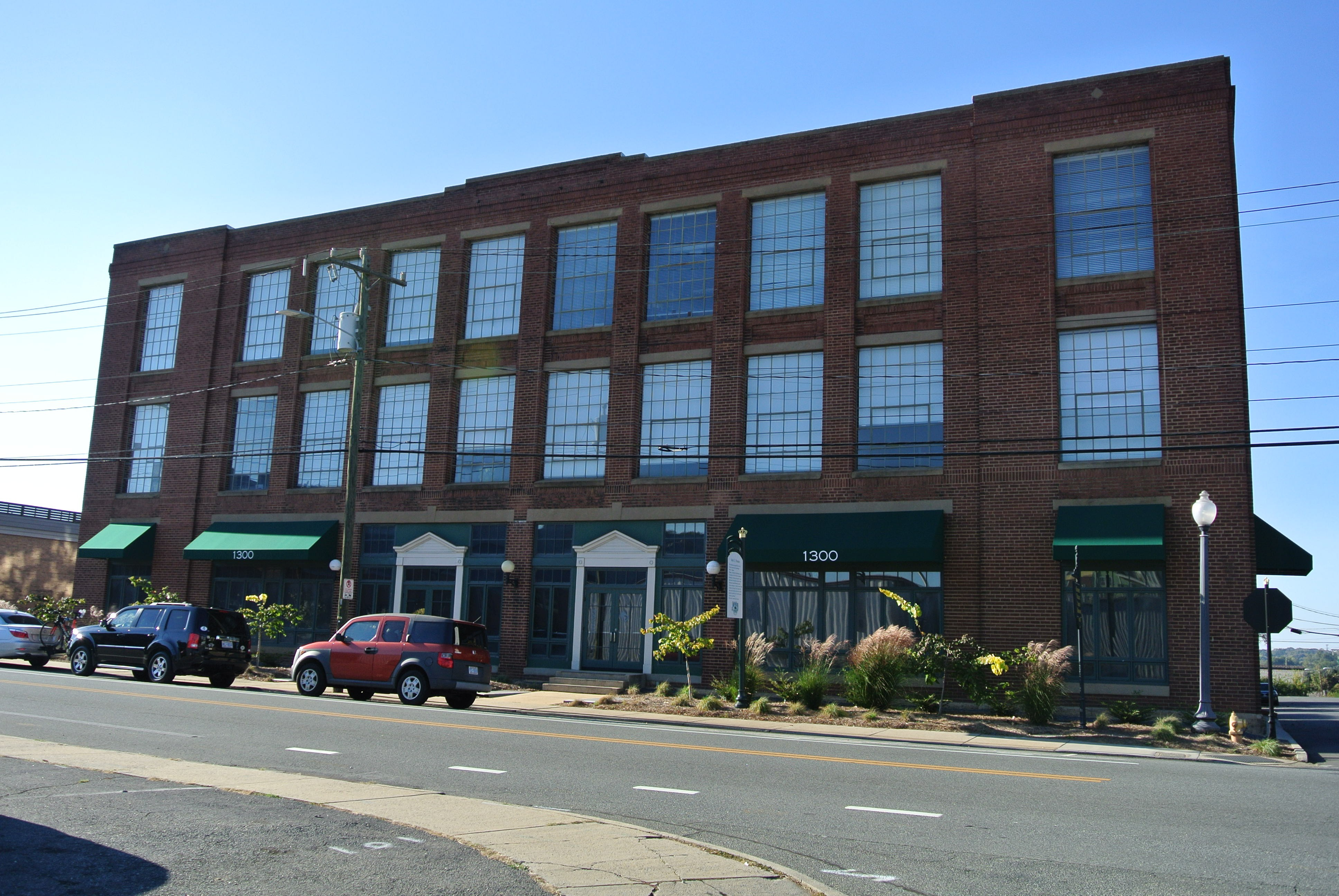
- Textile Mill Supply Company Building, October 2016

- Location within North Carolina Location within the United States
- Location: 1300 S. Mint St., Charlotte, North Carolina
- Coordinates: 35°13′17″N 80°51′31″W
- Area: 0.5 acres (0.20 ha)
- Built: 1922
- Built by: Clement, E.H. Co.
- Architect: Lockwood-Green & Co.
- Architectural style: Industrial
- NRHP reference No.: 99000091
- Added to NRHP: February 5, 1999

Textile Mill Supply Company Building is a historic factory building located at Charlotte, Mecklenburg County, North Carolina. It was designed by Lockwood, Greene & Co. and built in 1922. It is a three-story, ten-bay wide by-five-bay deep, red brick structure with a full basement. It has large rectangular windows and pine post-and-beam interior framing. The building housed the Textile Mill Supply Company that sold and distributed supplies essential to the operations of textile mills in the Piedmont sections of the Carolinas.

It was added to the National Register of Historic Places in 1999.
