= Drayton Mill =

- U.S. National Register of Historic Places
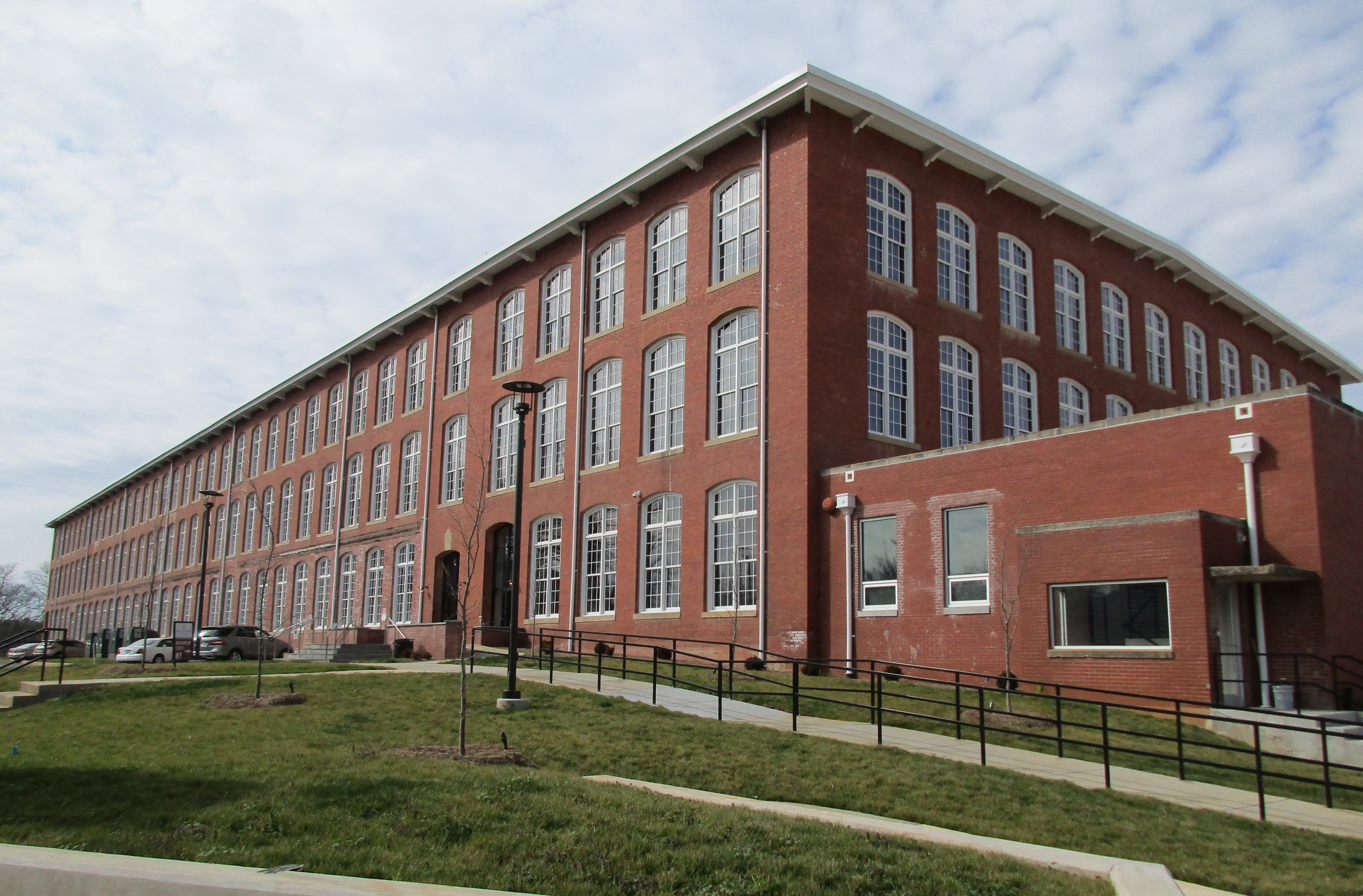
- Renovated Drayton Mill spinning building, March 2016

- Location within South Carolina Location within the United States
- Location: 1802 Drayton Rd., near Spartanburg, South Carolina
- Coordinates: 34°58′12″N 81°54′30″W
- Area: 16 acres (6.5 ha)
- Built: 1902-1958
- Architects: Lockwood, Greene & Co., Joseph E. Sirrine
- Architectural style: Tudor Revival
- NRHP reference No.: 12000373
- Added to NRHP: October 24, 2012

Drayton Mill is a historic textile mill complex located near Spartanburg, Spartanburg County, South Carolina. The complex includes the distinctive Tudor Revival company store and office building, constructed in 1919. Other buildings and structures include the three-story, rectangular, red brick spinning mill (1902-1904) with later additions, a cotton warehouse (1918), a two-story weaving building (1928), a 1,500,000 gallon mill pond, two water towers, two pump buildings, and an information center.

It was listed on the National Register of Historic Places in 2012.

== Redevelopment ==
From 2014 to 2017, the mill complex underwent a $60 million redevelopment, making it the largest historic renovation project in South Carolina's history.

In 2016, Charlotte-based TMS Development completed a $35 million renovation of the spinning and weaving buildings into 289 apartments as the first phase of the project, known as Drayton Mills Lofts. In addition to apartments, Drayton Mills Lofts includes several common areas, a fitness center, an outdoor pool, and artwork made from repurposed textile equipment throughout the interior of the two buildings.

In 2017, Montgomery Development Group completed a second phase of redevelopment of the warehouses and company store into 60,000-square-feet of commercial space, known as Drayton Mills Marketplace. As of summer 2017, two restaurants, a coffee shop, a fitness studio and a corporate office have opened or announced leases. The developer hopes to attract additional, similar tenants to the Marketplace as part of their vision for a live-work-play community.

A 2-mile long, public, paved multi-use trail connecting the mill to nearby Mary Black Hospital was completed in 2015. There are plans to connect the trail to others in Spartanburg as part of a larger system of greenways that will eventually span 21 miles.

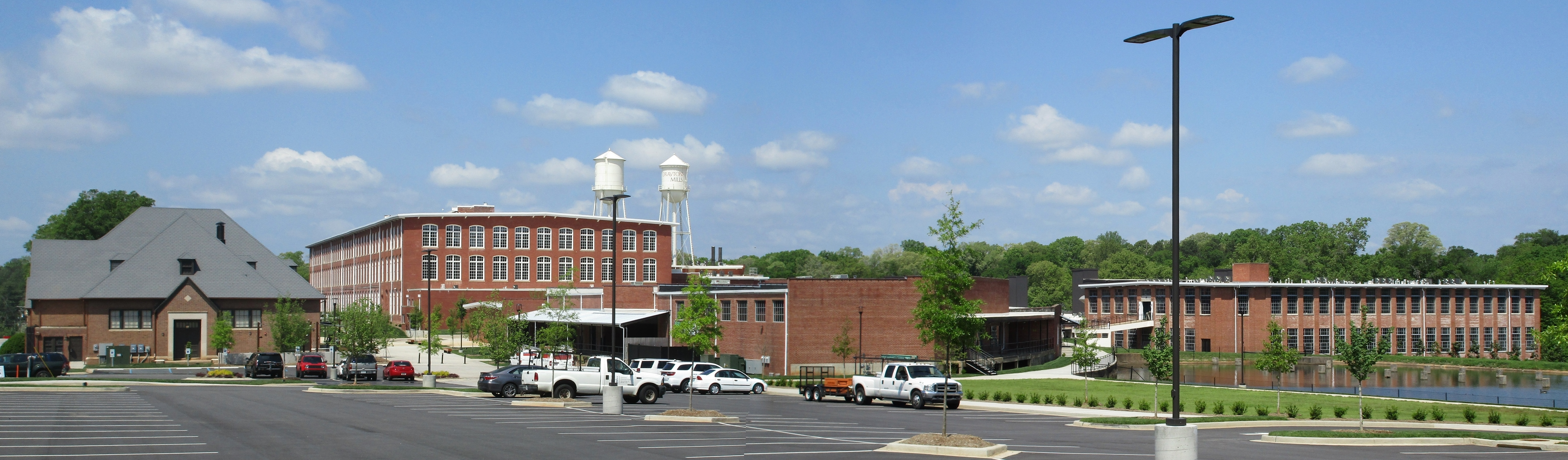
Panorama of renovated Drayton Mills complex in 2017

=== Future Developments ===
The renovation of the Drayton Mills complex is expected to spur investment in the adjacent community and on the east side of Spartanburg as a whole. Already, a new $36 million elementary school is under construction nearby on land donated by Pacolet Milliken. They own a significant amount of land in the Drayton area and plan to develop it into a mix of housing and commercial uses over the next several years.

== See also ==
- American Tobacco Historic District
- Ponce City Market
