= Charlotte Supply Company Building =

Historic building in North Carolina, US

- U.S. National Register of Historic Places
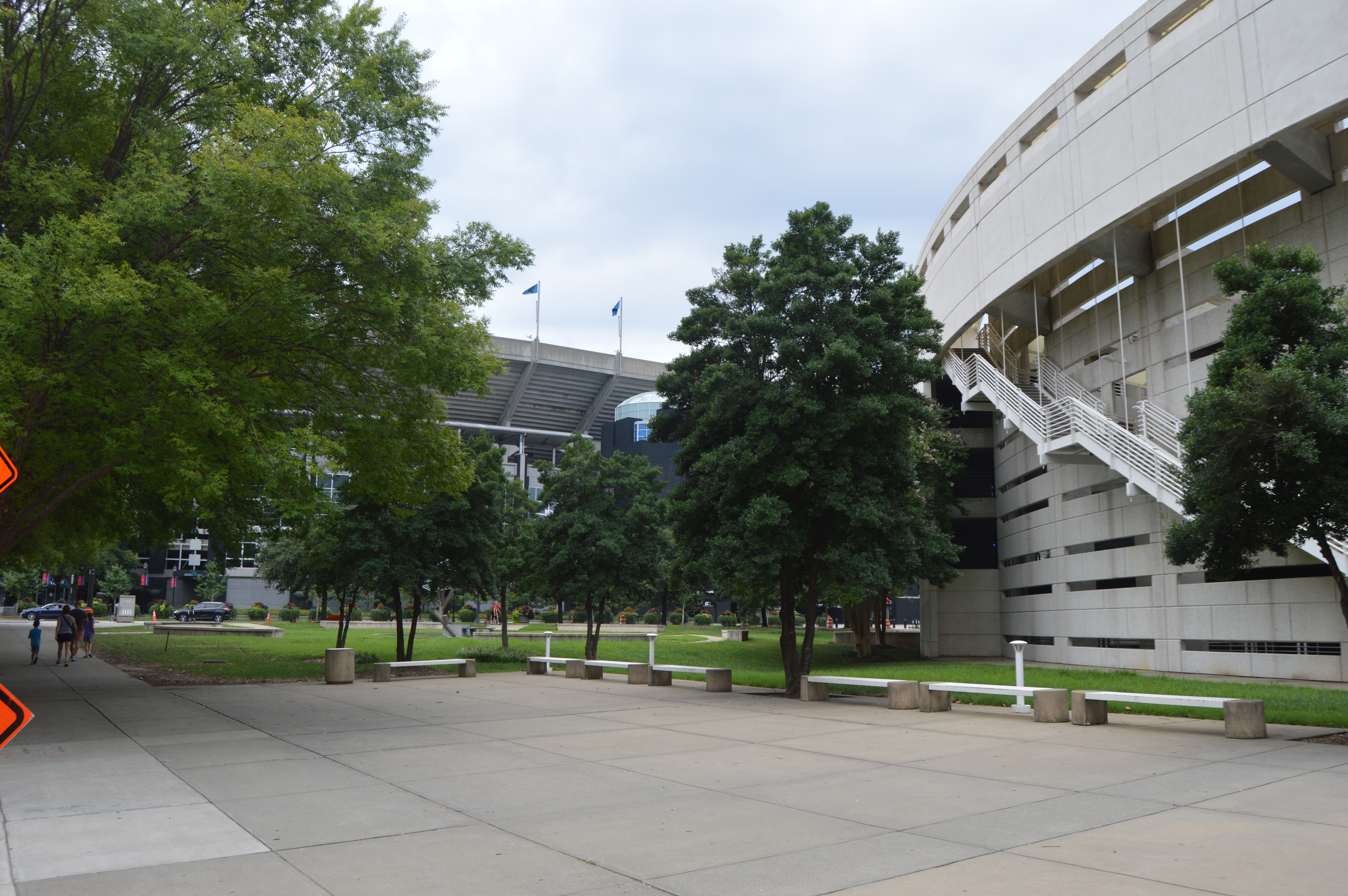
- Site of the building, now adjacent to Bank of America Stadium

- Location within North Carolina Location within the United States
- Location: 500 S. Mint St., Charlotte, North Carolina
- Coordinates: 35°13′35″N 80°51′2″W
- Area: less than one acre
- Built: 1924-1925
- Built by: Blythe & Isenhour
- Architect: Lockwood, Green & Co.
- NRHP reference No.: 84002348
- Added to NRHP: March 1, 1984

Charlotte Supply Company Building was a historic warehouse building located at Charlotte, Mecklenburg County, North Carolina.

== History ==
It was built in 1924–1925, and was a four-story, brick building measuring 40 feet wide and 127 feet deep. The building sat on a full basement and was designed by the architecture firm Lockwood, Greene and Company. It has been demolished

It was added to the National Register of Historic Places in 1984.
