= Dallas Mill =

- U.S. National Register of Historic Places
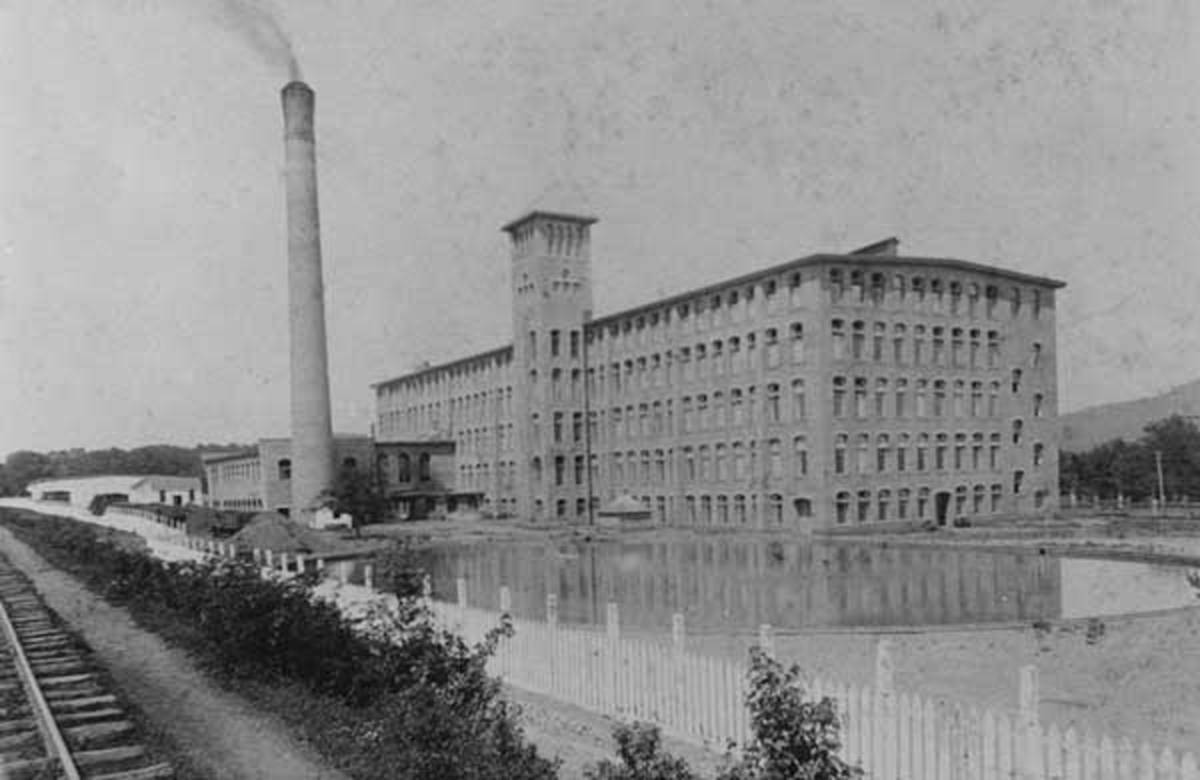
- Dallas Mill c.1899, before the expansion

- Location within Huntsville, Alabama Location within Alabama Location within the United States
- Location: 701 Dallas Avenue, Huntsville, Alabama
- Coordinates: 34°44′50″N 86°34′49″W
- Built: 1891
- Architect: Lockwood & Greene
- Architectural style: Italianate
- Demolished: 1991
- NRHP reference No.: 78000496
- Added to NRHP: September 18, 1978

- Dallas Mill Village Historic District
- U.S. National Register of Historic Places
- U.S. Historic district
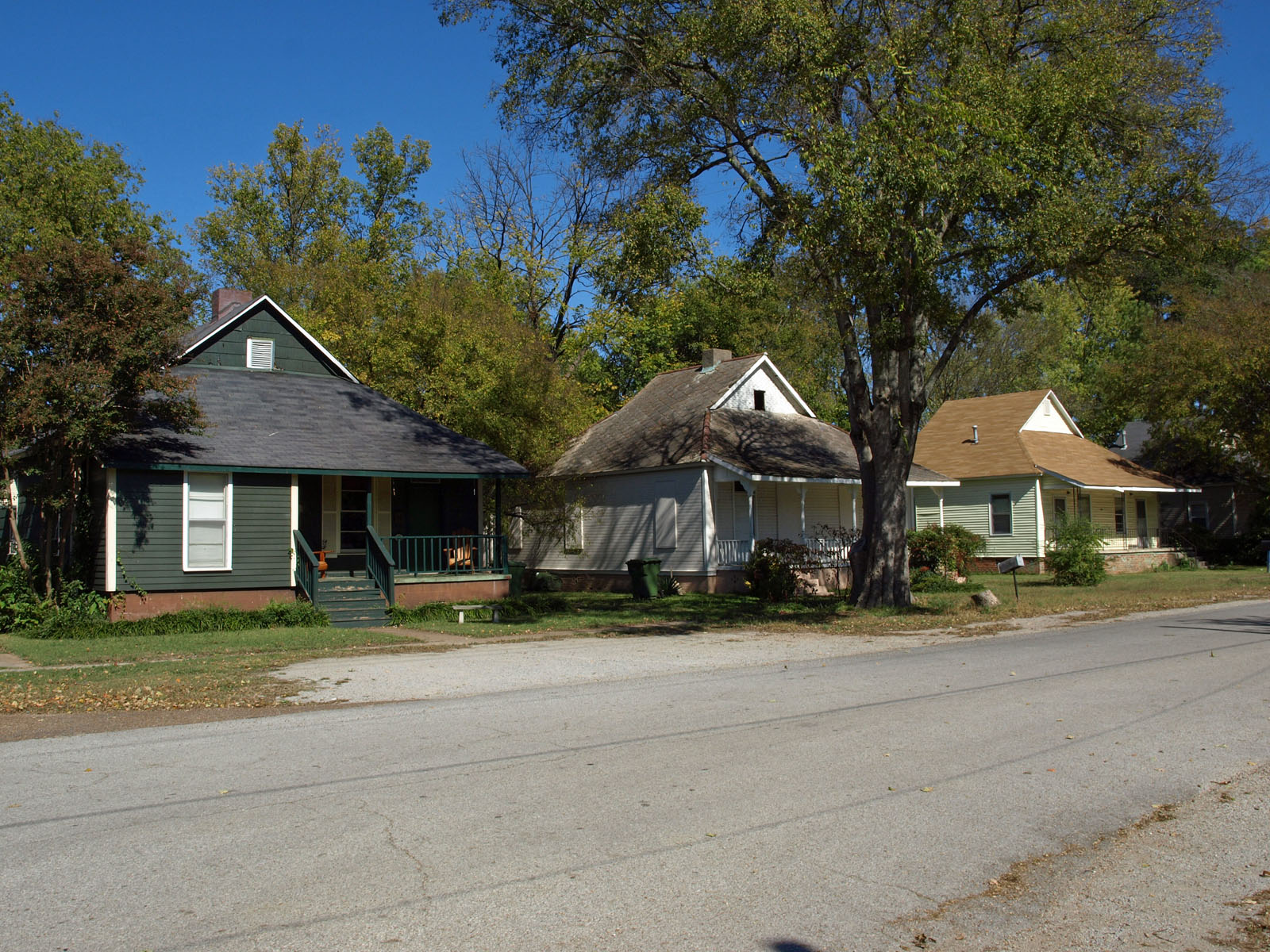
- Houses on O'Shaughnessy Avenue
- Location: Bounded by Dickson St. NE. to Russell St. NE., Rison Ave. NE. to Pratt Ave. NE., Huntsville, Alabama
- Coordinates: 34°44′33″N 86°34′44″W
- NRHP reference No.: 11000406
- Added to NRHP: June 27, 2011

Dallas Mill was a manufacturer of cotton sheeting in Huntsville, Alabama, United States. The first of four major textile mills in Huntsville, the mill operated from 1891 until 1949, before it was converted for use as a warehouse in 1955 and burned in 1991. The village, constructed to house workers and their families, was incorporated into the city in 1955. The mill and its mill village are listed on the National Register of Historic Places.

== History ==
In the 1880s, business leaders in Huntsville sought to increase the industrial presence in what was otherwise a small town of around 5,000 residents. The North Alabama Improvement Company was formed March 17, 1886, and promoted investment in the city to Northeastern businesses. In 1890 Trevanion Barlow Dallas, a Nashville mill executive, agreed to construct a cotton mill in Huntsville. Early stockholders in the mill included Dallas, the North Alabama Improvement Company, Michael O'Shaughnessy (another Nashville industrialist who moved to Huntsville and constructed a home named Kildare, also listed on the NRHP), and Northern industrialists including the Milliken family, owners of textile giant Deering Milliken. The mill was incorporated in 1891 and began operation on November 16, 1892.

When the mill opened, it contained 25,000 spindles, 704 looms, and employed 516 workers, making it one of the South's largest cotton mills. Just eight years later, the mill was doubled in size, to 50,000 spindles, 1,541 looms, 1,200 workers, and 300,000 square feet. The capital for the expansion came primarily from Milliken and Albert W. Green, who became the largest shareholders in the mill. The mill manufactured bleached and brown shirting and sheeting, and consumed approximately 20,000 bales of locally-grown cotton annually.

In the summer of 1900, a female worker was allegedly raped by a Black man named Elijah Clark. The entire workforce of the mill left work, went to the local jail and lynched in front of six thousand spectators. The mill later paid for the damage done to the Huntsville Jail by their workers.

The mill remained one of the largest employers in the area until the 1930s, when labor unrest began to disrupt all of Huntsville's cotton mills. From July 17 until September 22, 1934, a strike by the United Textile Workers of America brought violence to Huntsville. The mill was crippled by another strike in 1947; at the time of the strike, the mill employed 700 workers, but had dwindled to only 300 two years later. The mill operated on a partial basis until July 1949. Its assets were sold at auction, and the building was purchased by two Boaz businessmen for $175,000. They leased it to the Genesco Shoe Company, who used it as a distribution warehouse from 1955 until 1987. The mill was used as a warehouse for a real estate developer until the building was destroyed by a fire on July 24, 1991.

== Architecture ==
The main mill building was designed by Providence, Rhode Island architectural firm Lockwood, Greene & Co. in the Italianate style. The building was originally around 300 by 110 feet (91 by 34 meters), but was expanded to 650 feet (200 meters) long in 1900. A low-pitched gable roof projected two feet from the sides. Windows were set about 18 inches (46 centimeters) from the outer wall. Two square brick towers with pyramidal roofs housed water tanks and projected above the roof. Two brick chimneys from the boiler room sat behind the main building.

Each of the five stories had a central drive shaft, off of which pulleys were attached to power the machinery. The floors were supported by turned wood columns. The wooden window sashes pivoted such that the top third pivoted inward and the bottom two-thirds pivoted about its center so they could be left open even during rain. The new and old halves of the building were separated by firewalls and a central staircase and elevator.

After the 1991 fire, all that remains of the mill complex is the riveted steel water tower.

== Mill village ==
In 1892, the Huntsville Land Company was formed by some of the mill executives to construct homes to house the mill workers and their families. By 1916 the village consisted of 120 houses and 74 tenement buildings, before reaching a peak of 350 houses. Most of the homes in the village were sold to workers in the mid-1940s.

Rison School, named for mill general manager Archie L. Rison, was built in 1921. The school stood on the corner of Dallas Street and Oakwood Avenue, and grew through the years to serve grades 1–12. It became a part of the Huntsville City Schools system and operated as an elementary and middle school until 1967. Dallas Park (today known as Optimist Park) was built in 1928, and was the home to semi-professional baseball teams sponsored by the mill. The local Optimist Club purchased the park in 1949.

The mill village extends from Oakwood Avenue south to Pratt Avenue, and from Andrew Jackson Way west to Dallas Avenue. The village was listed on the National Register of Historic Places in 2011.

The records of the Dallas Manufacturing Company are located at Special Collections and Archives at the University of Alabama in Huntsville.
