= Life Savers Building =

- U.S. National Register of Historic Places
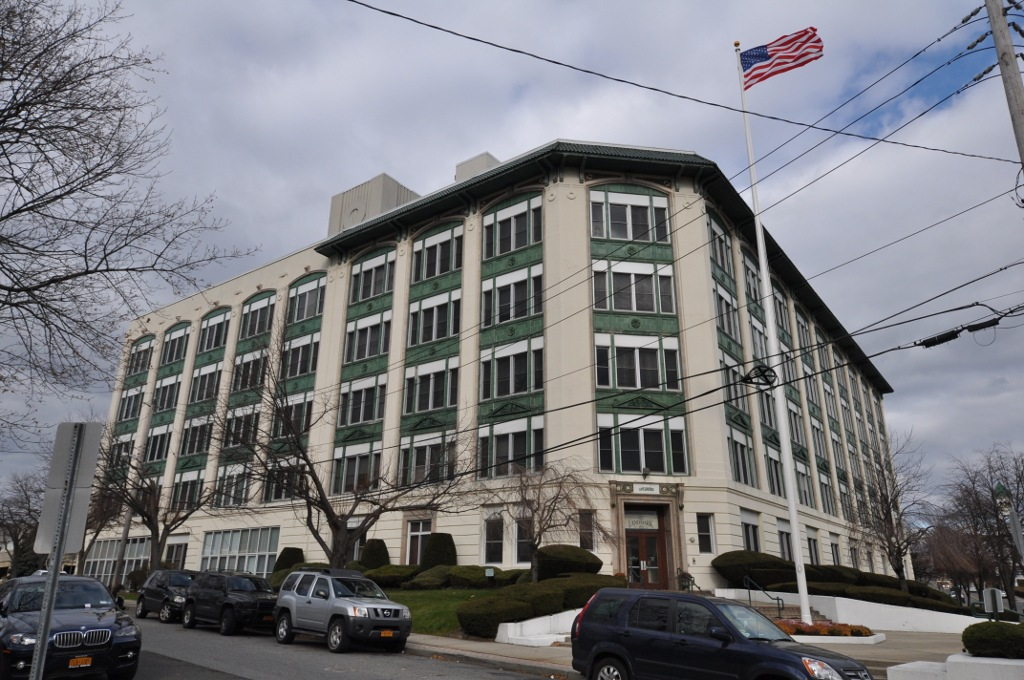
- Life Savers Building, November 2012

- Location within New York Location within the United States
- Location: N. Main St., Port Chester, New York
- Coordinates: 41°00′21″N 73°39′35″W
- Area: 2 acres (0.81 ha)
- Built: 1920
- Architects: Lockwood, Greene & Co.
- Architectural style: Chicago
- NRHP reference No.: 85001496
- Added to NRHP: July 11, 1985

Life Savers Building is a historic commercial and industrial building located on North Main Street between Horton and Wilkins Avenues in Port Chester, New York. It was built in 1920 and expanded in 1948–1949. It served as a manufacturing facility and headquarters of the Life Savers Candy Company until 1984. It is five stories high and constructed of reinforced concrete, brick, and terra cotta. It featured larger-than-life replicas of Life Savers rolls at the foundation line. During its peak period of production in the 1960s, as many as 616 million rolls of Life Savers candy were produced each year in the facility. It was converted into a condominium complex in 1989.

It was added to the National Register of Historic Places in 1985. The larger than life replicas of Life Savers have since been removed.

== Gallery ==
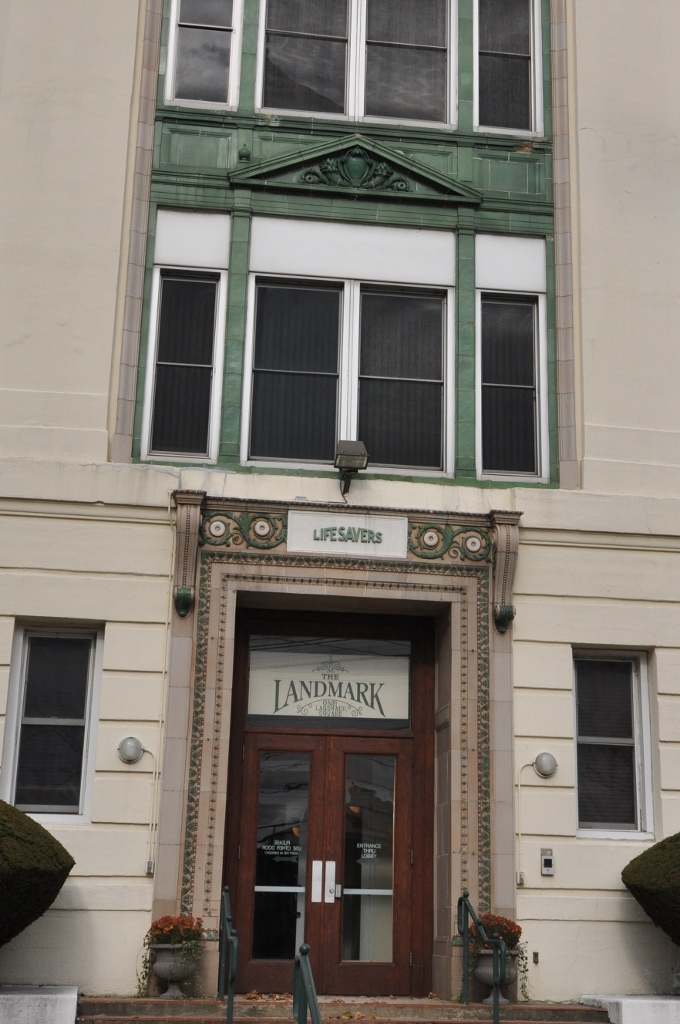
Closeup of entry, November 2012

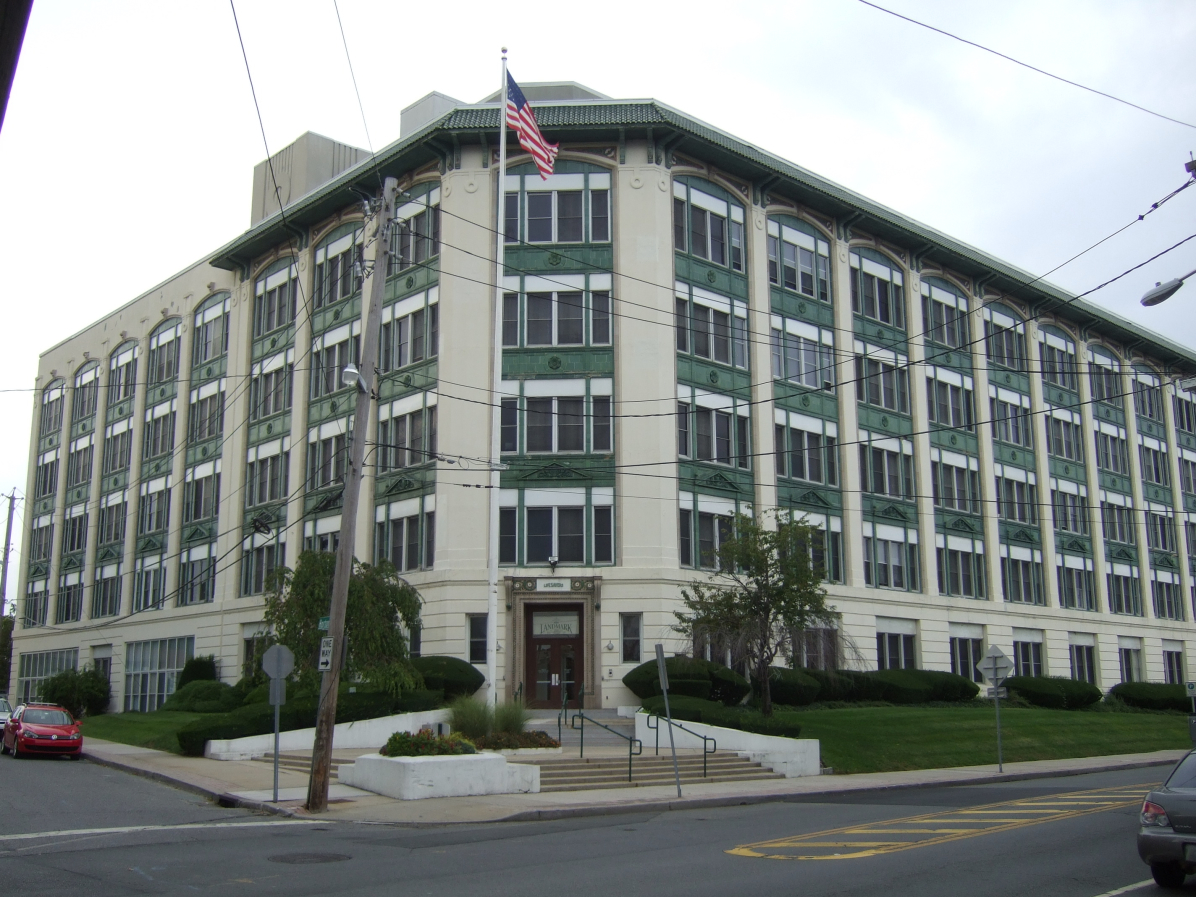
Life Savers Building September 2016

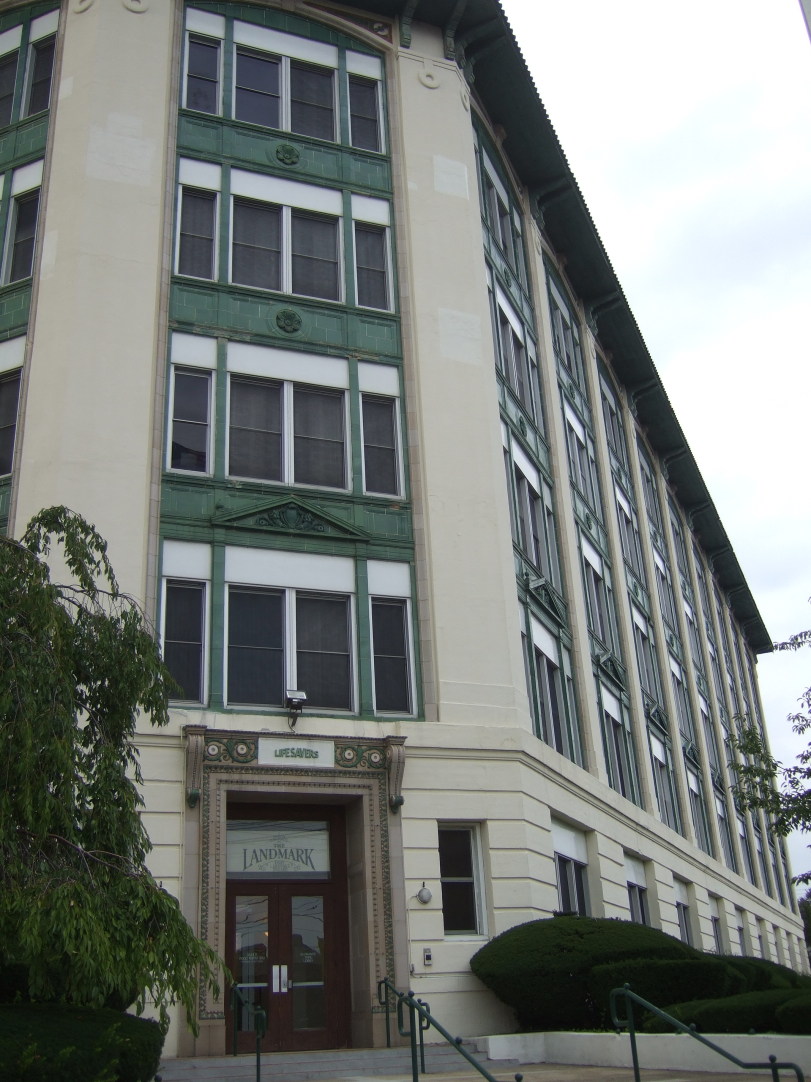
Life Savers Building September 2016

Some of the giant Life Saver rolls that previously lined the building, 1976.

== See also ==
- National Register of Historic Places listings in southern Westchester County, New York
