= Joseph Sykes Brothers Company Building =

Historic factory in North Carolina, US

- U.S. National Register of Historic Places
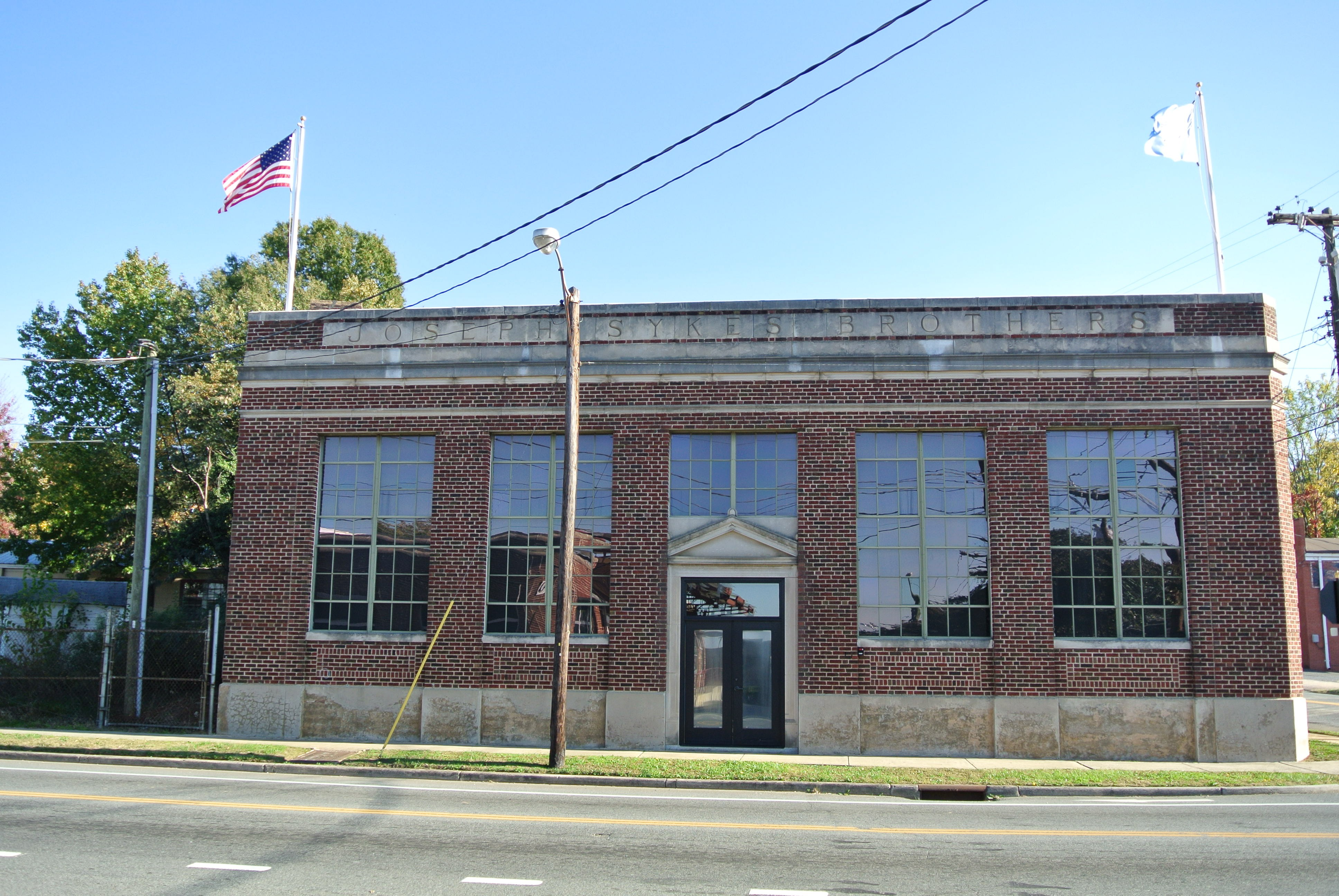
- Joseph Sykes Brothers Company Building, October 2016

- Location within North Carolina Location within the United States
- Location: 1445 S. Mint St., Charlotte, North Carolina
- Coordinates: 35°13′9″N 80°51′38″W
- Area: 0.7 acres (0.28 ha)
- Built: 1926
- Architect: Lockwood, Greene and Company; Blythe and Isenhour
- Architectural style: Classical Revival
- NRHP reference No.: 03000343
- Added to NRHP: May 1, 2003

Joseph Sykes Brothers Company Building is a historic factory building located at Charlotte, Mecklenburg County, North Carolina. It was designed by Lockwood, Greene & Co. and built in 1926. It is a one-story building that consists of a small office section in the front and a large machine shop to the rear. The building has a brick veneer, steel sash windows, and restrained Classical Revival detailing ornamenting the facade and side. It has undergone a certified rehabilitation. It was built as the Charlotte facility of the Joseph Sykes Brothers Company, an international producer of card clothing, machinery used in cotton production.

It was added to the National Register of Historic Places in 2003.
