= Pacolet Mills Historic District =

National historic district in Pacolet, South Carolina

- U.S. National Register of Historic Places
- U.S. Historic district
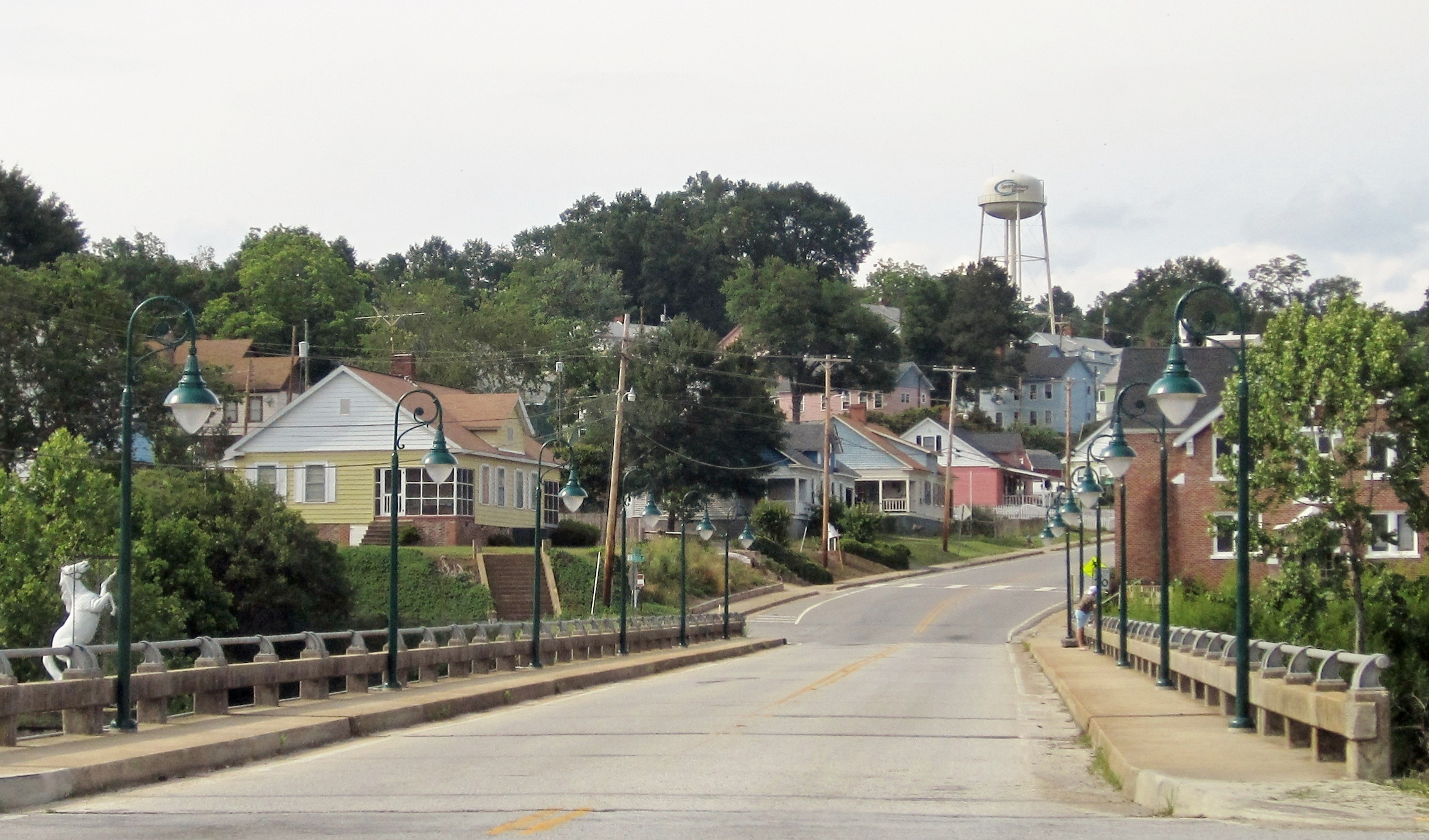
- Town of Pacolet Mills, May 2011

- Location within South Carolina Location within the United States
- Location: Roughly bounded by Brewster, Millikin, Walker, Montgomery & Moore Sts. & Granite Ave., Pacolet, South Carolina
- Coordinates: 34°55′11″N 81°44′34″W
- Area: 112.3 acres (45.4 ha)
- Built: 1883
- Architect: Collins, J. Frank; et.al.
- Architectural style: Bungalow/craftsman, Tudor Revival
- NRHP reference No.: 07001207
- Added to NRHP: November 16, 2007

Pacolet Mills Historic District is a national historic district in Pacolet, Spartanburg County, South Carolina. It encompasses 126 contributing buildings and 1 contributing site in the mill village of Pacolet. The Pacolet Mills village was laid out and built in 1919, with most worker and supervisor houses constructed between 1915 and 1920. Also located in the district are the Pacolet Mills Cloth Room and Warehouse, Pacolet Mill Office, and two churches. The three main Pacolet Mills (1883, 1888, and 1891) and a fourth mill (1894) were demolished in the late 1980s.

It was listed on the National Register of Historic Places in 2007.
