= Nuckolls-Jefferies House =

Historic house in South Carolina, United States

- U.S. National Register of Historic Places
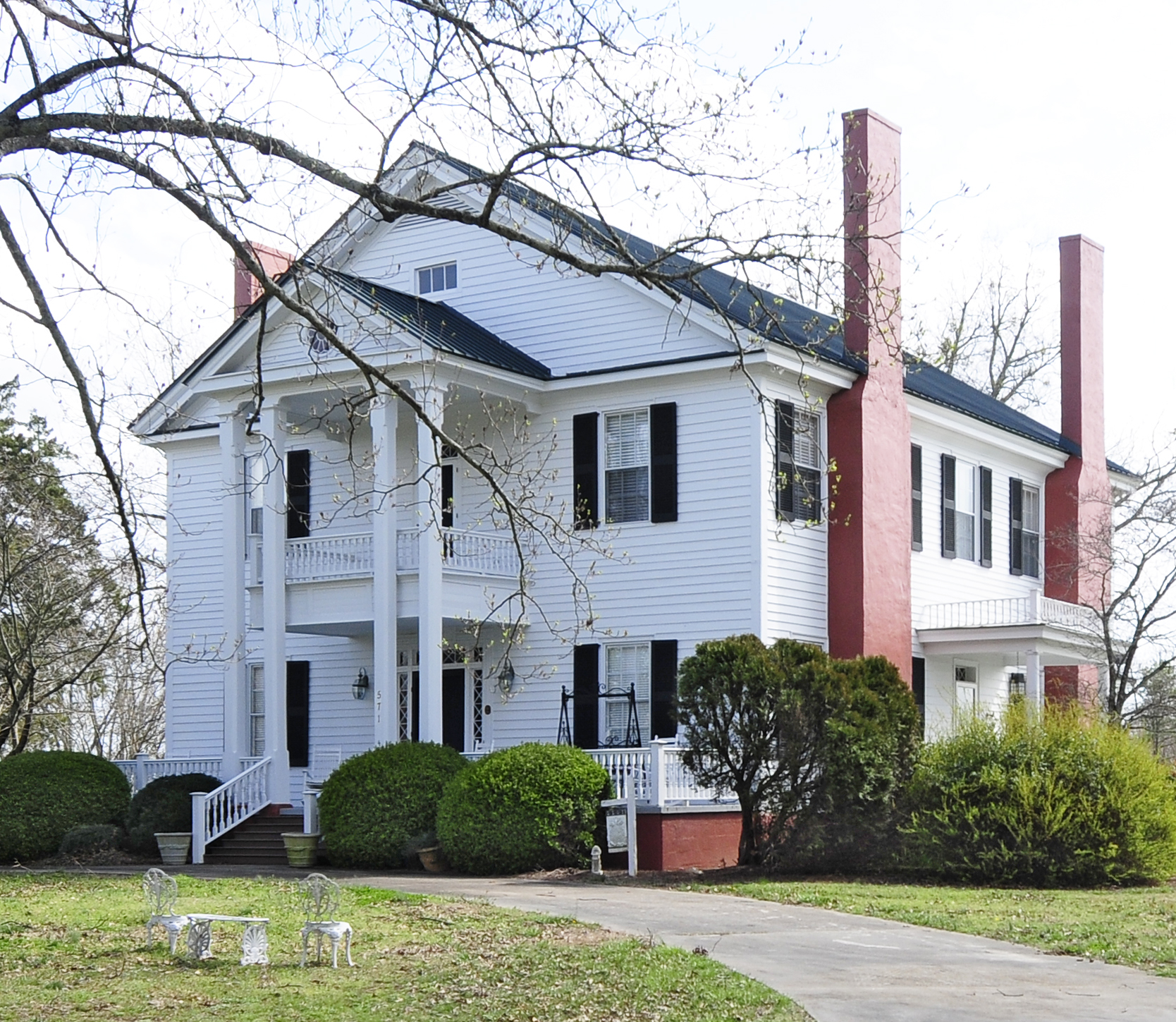
- Nuckolls-Jeffries House, March 2012

- Location within South Carolina Location within the United States
- Location: 571 Asbury Rd., near Pacolet, South Carolina
- Coordinates: 34°55′47.8″N 81°39′27.1″W
- Area: 1.4 acres (0.57 ha)
- Built: 1843
- Architectural style: Greek Revival, Classical Revival
- NRHP reference No.: 07000336
- Added to NRHP: April 18, 2007

Nuckolls-Jefferies House, also known as the Nuckolls House and Wagstop Plantation, is a historic plantation house located near Pacolet, Cherokee County, South Carolina. It was built in 1843, with alterations in the 1870s or 1880s. It is a 2 1/2-story, frame residence in a combined Greek Revival / Classical Revival style. It is clad in weatherboard and sits on a stone foundation. The front facade features a two-tiered central, pedimented portico supported by two sets of slender wooden posts. The rear of the house has a two-story ell, built during the 1996 restoration. Also on the property are three contributing outbuildings: a small, one-story log gable-front building that dates from the mid-to-late 19th century that served as the farm's smokehouse, a 1 1/2-story gable-front frame barn, and another frame gable-front barn with side shed lean-to extensions.

It was listed in the National Register of Historic Places in 2007.
