= Mulberry Chapel Methodist Church =

Historic church in South Carolina, United States

- U.S. National Register of Historic Places
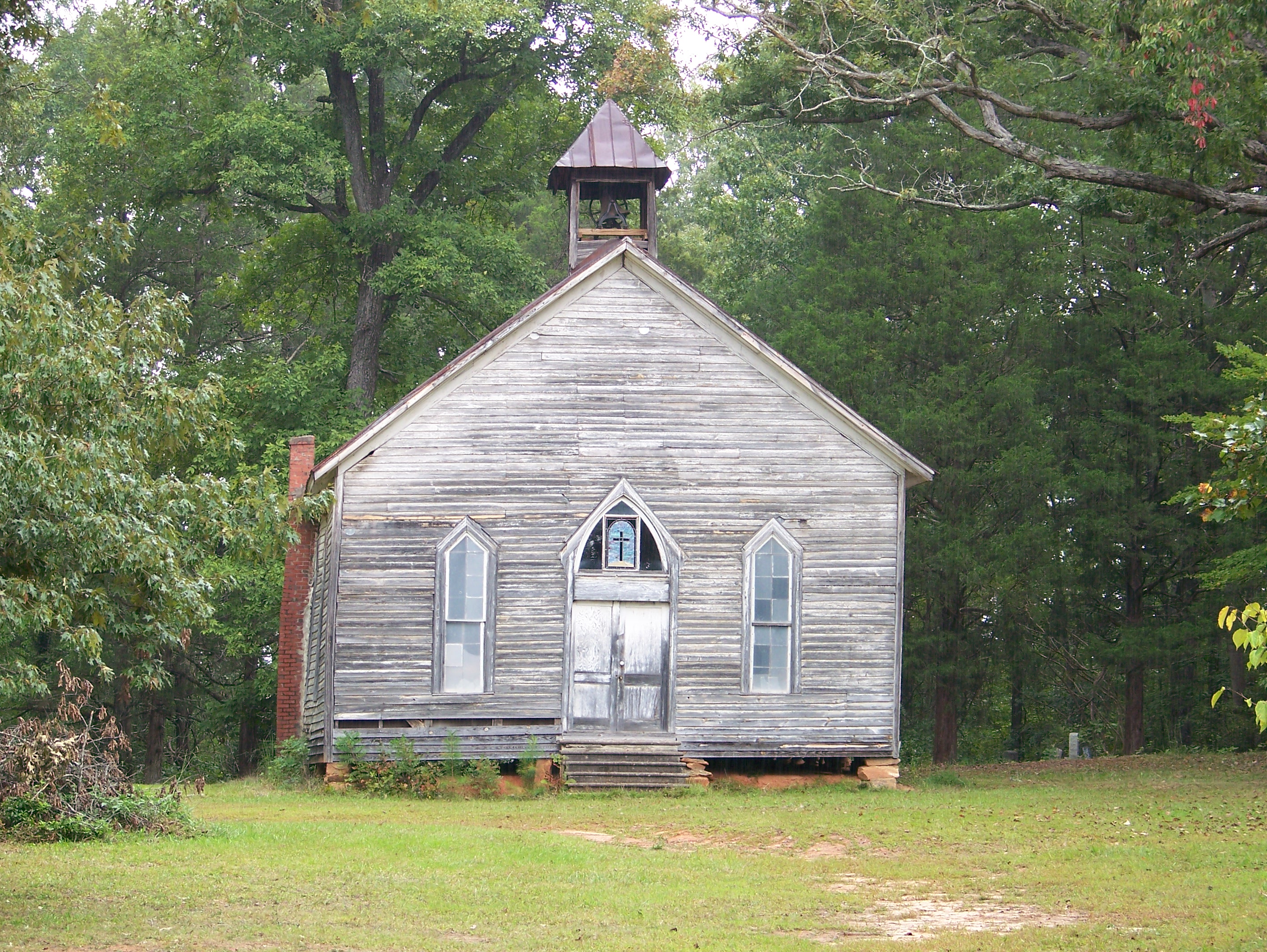

- Location within South Carolina Location within the United States
- Location: 538 Asbury Rd., near Pacolet, South Carolina
- Coordinates: 34°55′49.7″N 81°39′14.3″W
- Area: 2 acres (0.81 ha)
- Built: 1880
- Architectural style: Gothic Revival
- NRHP reference No.: 12000370
- Added to NRHP: June 27, 2012

Mulberry Chapel Methodist Church, also known as Mulberry Chapel Methodist Episcopal Church and Mulberry Chapel, is a historic Methodist church located near Pacolet, Cherokee County, South Carolina. It was built about 1880, and is a one-story, vernacular Gothic Revival style frame church building. It is one of only a few extant African-American churches in South Carolina dating from the first 25 years after the American Civil War. Also on the property is a cemetery with approximately 20 marked graves and an additional 20 or more unmarked ones. Headstones date from 1888 to the 1960s. The most prominent figure associated with the cemetery is Samuel Nuckles, a former slave who served in the 1868 Constitutional Convention and represented Union County in the South Carolina House of Representatives during Reconstruction, between 1868 and 1872.

It was listed on the National Register of Historic Places in 2012.
