= Samuel Nuckles =

American 19th century politician

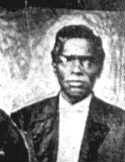

South Carolina House of Representatives
- In office 1868–1872

Personal details
- Resting place: Mulberry Chapel Methodist Church
- Party: Republican

Samuel Nuckles was an American legislator in South Carolina during the Reconstruction era. He represented Union County. Nuckles was a state representative for Union County from 1868 until 1872. He is buried at Mulberry Chapel Methodist Church. His photograph was included in a montage of Radical Republican South Carolina legislators.

== Testimony on KKK Intimidation ==
A Republican, he gave testimony about a campaign of intimidation used by Democrats and the Ku Klux Klan in the 1870 election. In July 1871, Nuckles testified before the Joint Senate Committee to Inquire into the Condition of Affairs in the Late Insurrectionary States. At that time, he was an elected official and a refugee in Columbia, along with one hundred and fifty others from Union County. Knuckles reported to the committee that the first instance of intimidation occurred during the 1870 election:

Mr Byars was standing talking to me, and he said, “Nuckles, I’ll bet you $500 that in two years from to-day there’ll not be a colored man voting in the town.” I said, “How do you know?” He says, “You’ll know by waiting. By God, there will not be a colored man voting in the town.” I said, “Why, will they run away?” He says, “You’ll know by waiting.” Several were around, and some said, “Nuckles, I wouldn’t talk with Byars.
