= Pacolet, South Carolina =

- Town
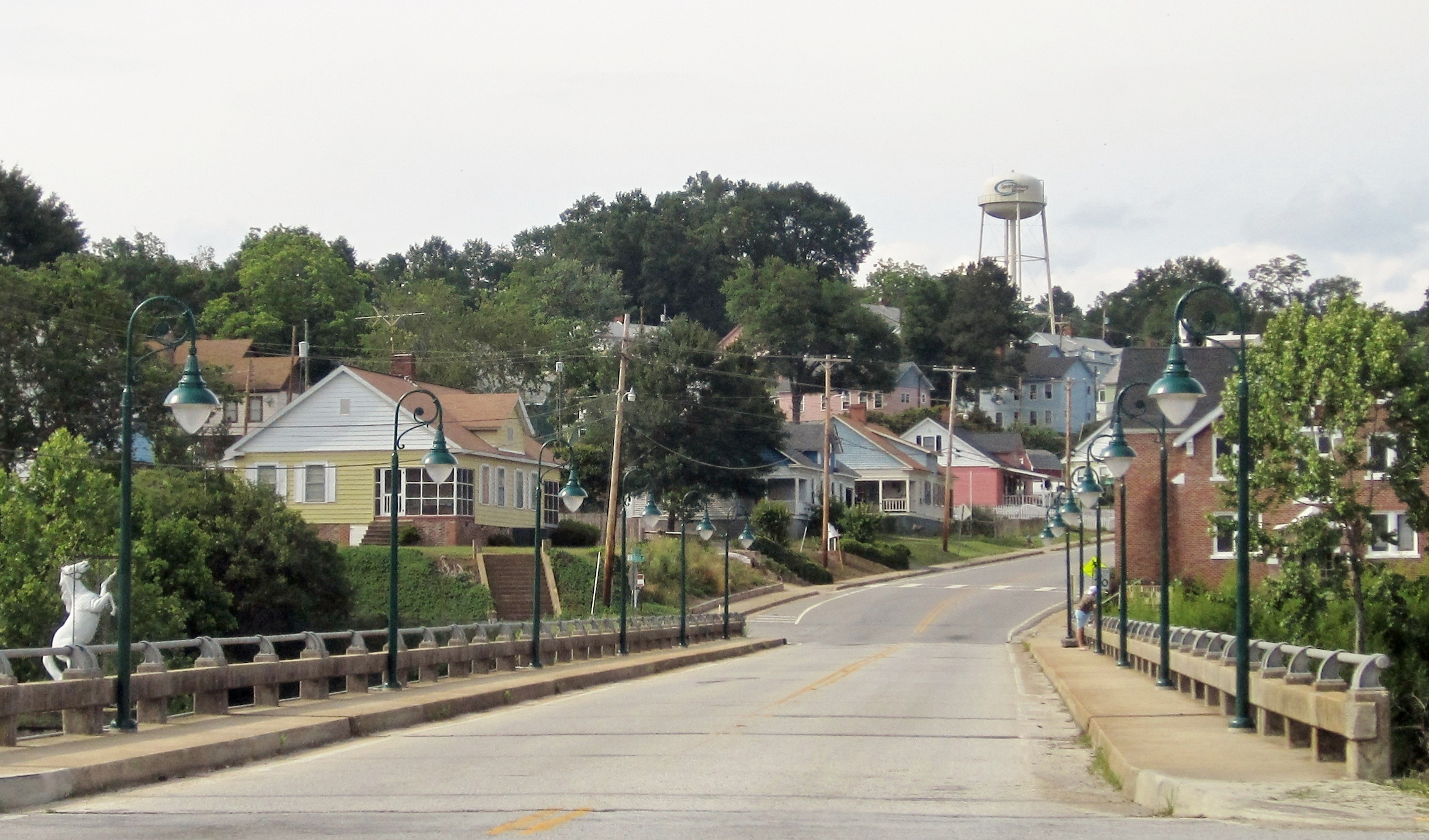

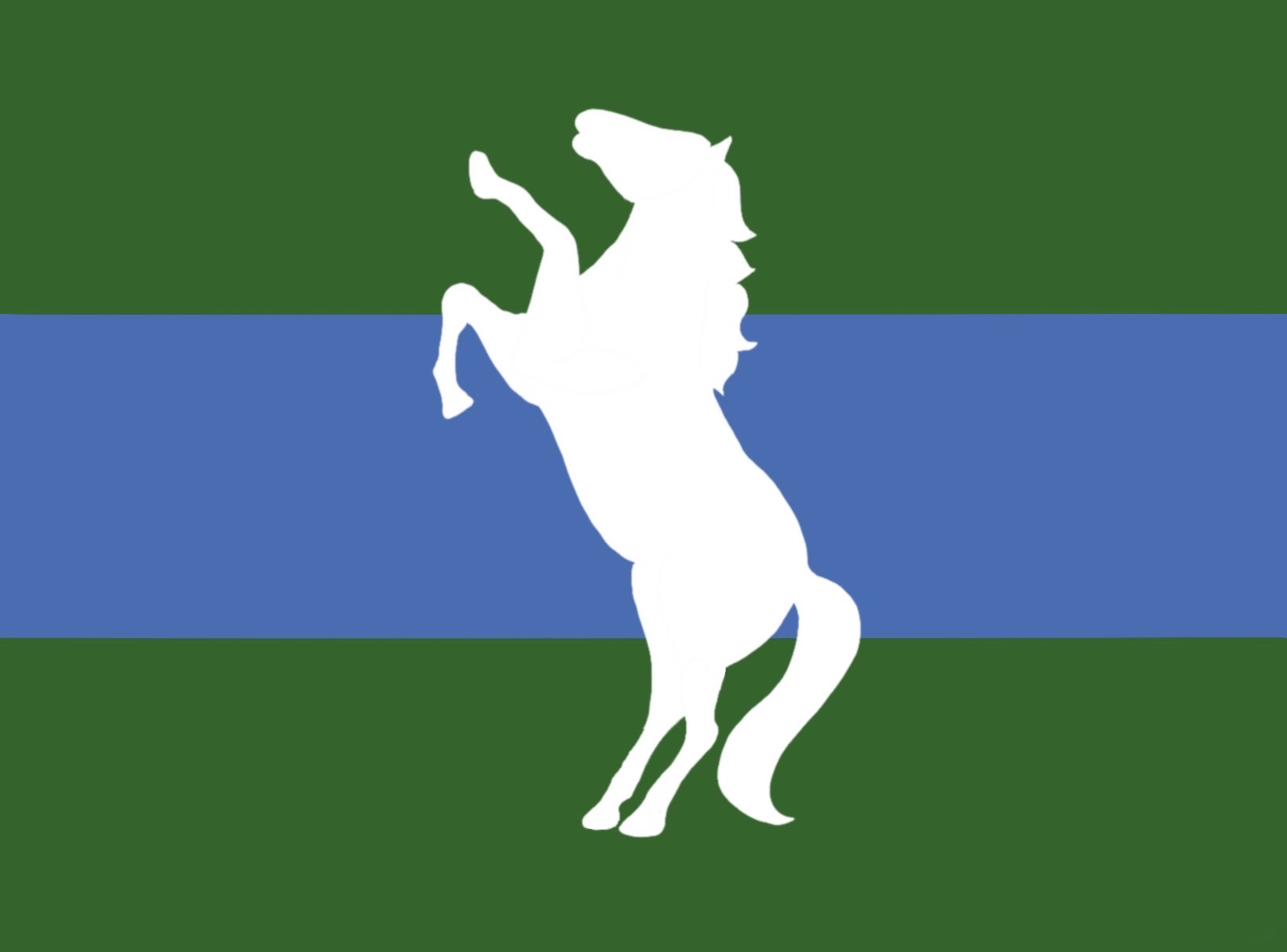
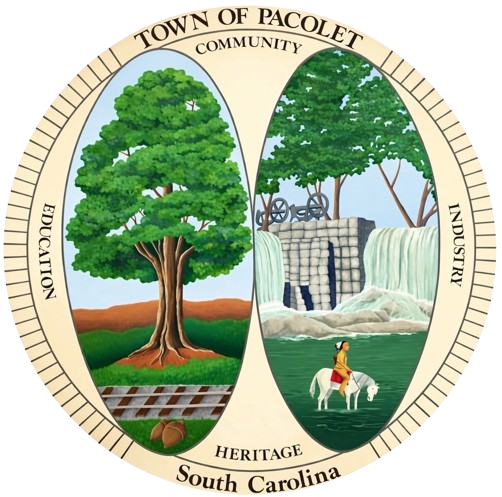
- Flag Seal Logo
- Motto: "Close to Everything, Far From Ordinary"
- Location of Pacolet, South Carolina
- Coordinates: 34°54′47″N 81°45′15″W
- Country: United States
- State: South Carolina
- County: Spartanburg
- First settled: 1784
- Incorporated: May 6, 1896

Government
  - Type: Mayor–council government
  - Mayor: Tim Burrell

Area
  - Total: 5.85 sq mi (15.15 km^{2})
  - Land: 5.78 sq mi (14.97 km^{2})
  - Water: 0.069 sq mi (0.18 km^{2})
- Elevation: 719 ft (219 m)

Population (2020)
  - Total: 2,274
  - Density: 393.5/sq mi (151.92/km^{2})
- Demonym: Pacoletian
- Time zone: UTC-5 (Eastern (EST))
  - Summer (DST): UTC-4 (EDT)
- ZIP code: 29372
- Area codes: 864, 821
- FIPS code: 45-53845
- GNIS feature ID: 2407064
- Website: Pacolet, South Carolina

Pacolet (pronounced /ˈpækʔlɪt/, PACK-lit) is a town in Spartanburg County, South Carolina, United States. The population was 2,274 at the 2020 census.

== Etymology ==
The town of Pacolet is named after the Pacolet River which runs through it. Several theories exist to explain the origin of the word Pacolet. The word is believed to be French in origin, meaning "swift messenger," "swift runner," or "swift horseman." One of the early settlers of the nearby community of Grindal Shoals was a Frenchman named Packolette. Several historical examples exist of individuals in the area using Pacolet or Packolette as a first or middle name. Another theory states that the word is Cherokee in origin, although there is no substantial evidence to support this claim.

However, the etymology of "swift horsemen" proved popular enough that the Pacolet Manufacturing Company adopted a running horse as a symbol in various capacities. This likely later influenced the naming of the local baseball team ("The Pacolet Trojans"). According to C. Bruce Littlejohn in his memoir Pacolets I Have Known, a person from Pacolet is called a Pacoletian, either pronounced /pækʔ'leʃɪn/ (pack-LAY-shin) or /pækʔ'lɛtiːɪn/ (pack-LET-ee-in).

== History ==
=== Precolonial ===
The area that would become Pacolet was seldom occupied for thousands of years, only occasionally passed through by American Indians. The local Catawba and Cherokee would almost exclusively use the land as hunting grounds, with the exception of soapstone quarries around the Pacolet River established approximately 3,000 to 5,000 years ago. The soapstone mined in the area would be used to make storage vessels and tools. It is believed that one of the quarries in the Pacolet area was the largest American Indian soapstone quarry in the United States.

=== Early European Settlement ===
In 1567, the first European explorers passed through the Pacolet area with the arrival of Spanish explorer Juan Pardo and his small party of explorers. No further European explorers or settlers would come to the area until around the mid-1700s. It was at this time that many second- and third-generation Scotch-Irish Americans moved from Pennsylvania, Virginia, and North Carolina to the Upcountry of South Carolina. They first settled largely around Grindal Shoals, named after John Grindal, who received a charter for the land in 1743. Eventually, settlements would begin at Easterwood Ford, Hurricane Shoals, and Trough Shoals.

During the American Revolutionary War, General Daniel Morgan of the Continental Army would establish a camp at Grindal Shoals in December 1780 in preparation for the upcoming Battle of Cowpens, breaking camp on January 15, 1781. British Army Colonel Banastre Tarleton would cross the Pacolet River at Easterwood Ford, where they would be defeated in one of the most crucial battles of the Revolution.

In 1784, the royal governor of South Carolina would issue land grants to John Tolleson. Tolleson built a tavern on a stagecoach road that ran from Columbia to Spartanburg in the area that would become Pacolet Station. He would later open a general store which served as the voting precinct of the area until 1816. Tolleson's bar would cause the community to gain a reputation for drinking, fighting, and horse racing. It is possible that the prevalence of cockfighting earned the area the name Buzzard's Roost.

=== Nineteenth Century ===
In 1802, deposits of gold were discovered in the nearby Greenville district. The ensuing Carolina Gold Rush would come to the Pacolet River area and peak in 1830. Various mines were constructed, and equipment for mining was visible in Pacolet until the 1950s.

On November 25, 1859, the first train arrived in Pacolet, connecting the town via the Spartanburg and Union Railroad that began construction in the 1850s. Town lots were laid off and, in 1860, George W. Brown, Jr. purchased several lots to construct the first frame house in Pacolet. More lots would be sold for the construction of more houses, stores, and churches. During the American Civil War, many Confederate soldiers from Pacolet would be assigned to Company M of the 1st Regiment of Palmetto Sharpshooters, nicknamed the "Pacolet Guards." They would be present in many battles across the Eastern theater, including General Robert E. Lee's surrender at Appomattox Courthouse. On May 6, 1896, Pacolet Station became incorporated.

Like most of the Southeastern United States, Pacolet and the surrounding area was economically dominated by the agricultural industry, particularly cotton. According to The History of Pacolet, “In 1881, the firm of Walker and Fleming bought several hundred acres of land on both sides of the Pacolet River at Trough Shoals and the next year Pacolet Manufacturing was born. Pacolet Mill was a unit of Pacolet Manufacturing Company from 1882 until Pacolet Manufacturing Company was merged with other textile corporations to form Pacolet Industries, Inc. in 1962.” Seth Milliken, a senior member of Deering Milliken & Company from New York, became director of Pacolet Manufacturing Company in 1899. The owners of the mill would construct housing, stores, and other services for the employees of their mills, turning Pacolet into a mill town. Milliken became an incredibly influential figure in the community, along with Victor M. Montgomery who was elected director in 1902.

=== Twentieth Century ===
It would be under their guidance that Pacolet and its mills would be rebuilt after, on June 6, 1903, a storm in the mountains north of Spartanburg caused the Pacolet River to overflow and flood the town and mills. Mills No. 1 and 2 were completely swept by the river, with extreme damage to No. 3. No flood insurance was available at the time, leading to a major financial loss for Pacolet Manufacturing Company. Montgomery, who was inexperienced in finance, traveled to New York to ask the advice of Milliken who guided him through the recovery process.

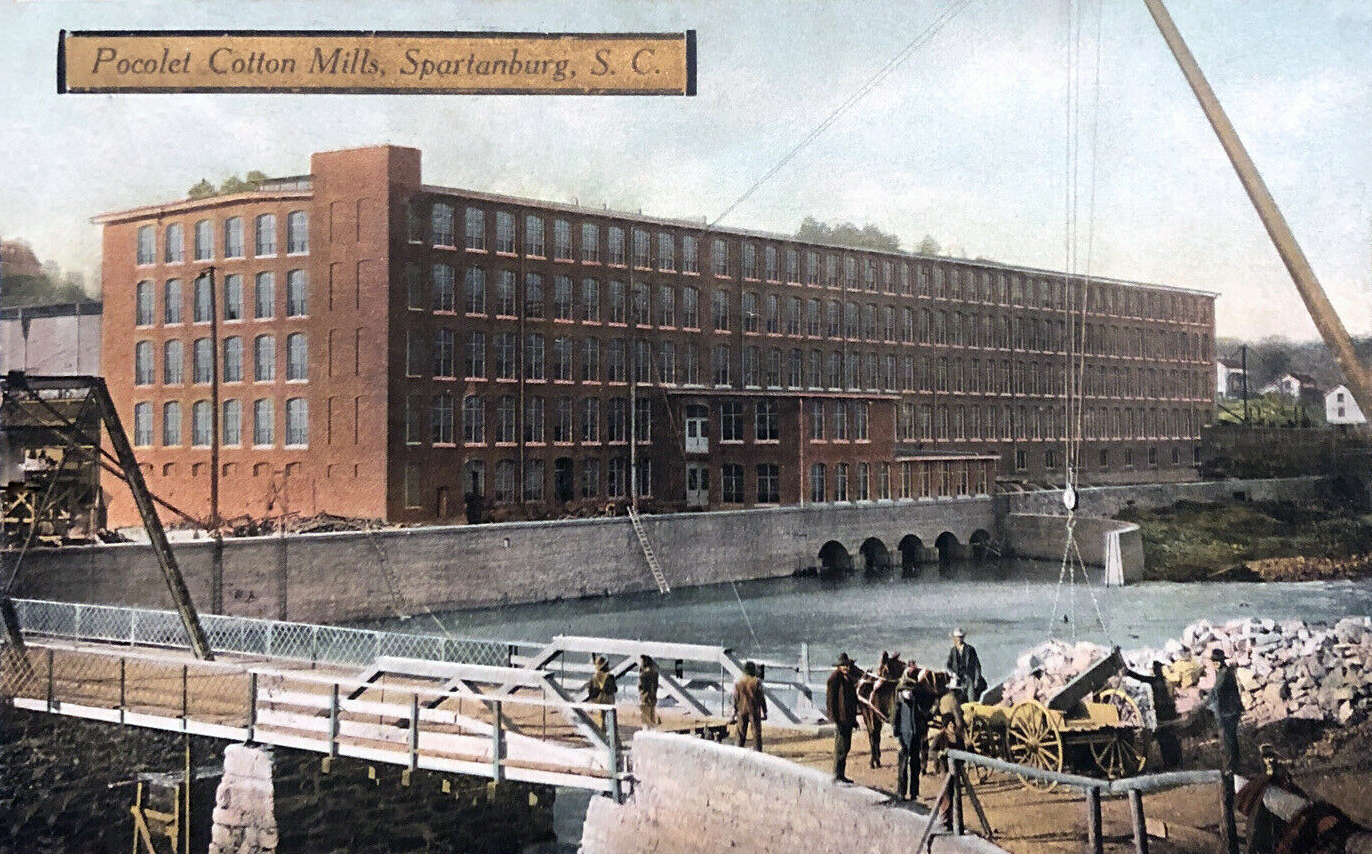
Pacolet Cotton Mill No. 5

Trough Shoals would rename itself as Pacolet Mills in 1930 and would receive a charter in 1955 alongside Central Pacolet, which was previously known as the Bryantvillle Post Office. By the 1940s and 50s, the town had its own skating rink, pool hall, a company store, drug store, swimming pool, and movie theater. In the early half of the twentieth century, textile baseball became a popular pastime in the town. The town would have several teams named the Pacolet Trojans playing in various leagues since at least 1919, both White and Black. Teams often played at the community ballpark. A commemorative statue honoring the Trojans would later be erected and placed beside the bridge in Pacolet Mills, becoming a roadside attraction and symbol of Pacolet. Around 1920, a large hotel originally called Victor Inn would be constructed overlooking the river and mill. It was this building that gave the hill its name Hotel Hill. It would be demolished in the 1960s.

=== Present ===
Deering Milliken, which owned the mills that employed a large portion of the town for decades, ceased operations in 1983. In 1997, Pacolet Station and Pacolet Mills would merge into the town of Pacolet. Alongside Central Pacolet (which is its own legally distinct town), the three incorporated towns which made up the Three Pacolets are now known as Pacolet.

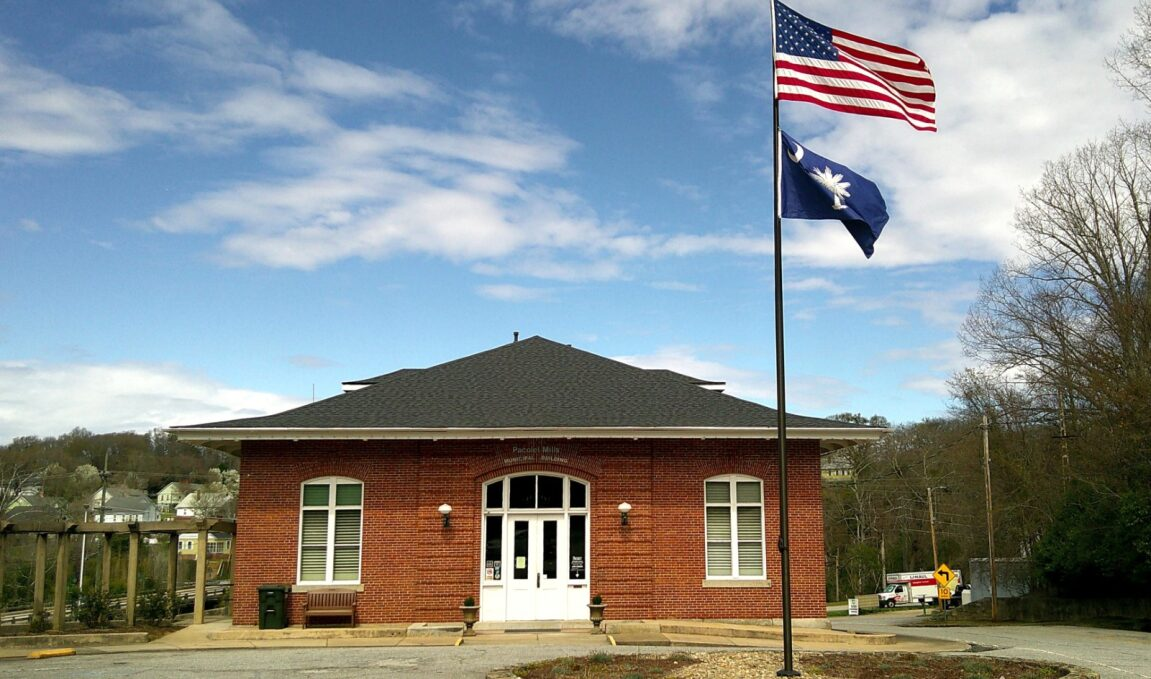
Pacolet Town Hall

==== Historic sites ====
The Marysville School, Mulberry Chapel Methodist Church, Nuckolls-Jefferies House, Pacolet Mill Office, Pacolet Mills Cloth Room and Warehouse, Pacolet Mills Historic District, and Pacolet Soapstone Quarries are listed on the National Register of Historic Places.

== Geography ==
According to the United States Census Bureau, the town has a total area of 3.0 square miles (7.8 km^{2}), of which 0.01 square miles (0.03 km^{2}) (0.34%) is water. The most common soil series is Cecil, although there is a significant amount of Bethlehem in the area surrounding the Pacolet River.

=== Climate ===
The town of Pacolet has a humid subtropical climate with long, hot, and humid summers and cool to semimild winters. The average annual temperature is 61.6 °F (16.4 °C). In the summer from June through September, average highs are in the 80s °F (20s °C) to low 90s °F (30s °C), while in the winter, average highs are in the mid-50s °F (10s °C). Annual rainfall is spread fairly evenly throughout the whole year. Pacolet receives very little snowfall, with the annual average being under 2 inches (5 cm). Annual precipitation is around 50 inches (127 cm), and the average growing season is about 235 days.

Climate data for Pacolet, South Carolina (1991–2020 normals, extremes 1983–present)
Month	Jan	Feb	Mar	Apr	May	Jun	Jul	Aug	Sep	Oct	Nov	Dec	Year
Record high °F (°C)	79 (26)	82 (28)	90 (32)	94 (34)	96 (36)	102 (39)	106 (41)	106 (41)	98 (37)	99 (37)	84 (29)	80 (27)	106 (41)
Mean daily maximum °F (°C)	54.1 (12.3)	58.5 (14.7)	66.0 (18.9)	74.8 (23.8)	81.0 (27.2)	87.0 (30.6)	90.1 (32.3)	88.3 (31.3)	83.4 (28.6)	74.4 (23.6)	63.8 (17.7)	55.8 (13.2)	73.1 (22.8)
Daily mean °F (°C)	42.8 (6.0)	46.1 (7.8)	52.9 (11.6)	61.1 (16.2)	68.5 (20.3)	75.8 (24.3)	79.3 (26.3)	78.1 (25.6)	72.5 (22.5)	61.7 (16.5)	51.1 (10.6)	44.7 (7.1)	61.2 (16.2)
Mean daily minimum °F (°C)	31.5 (−0.3)	33.8 (1.0)	39.8 (4.3)	47.3 (8.5)	56.0 (13.3)	64.6 (18.1)	68.6 (20.3)	67.8 (19.9)	61.6 (16.4)	49.0 (9.4)	38.4 (3.6)	33.6 (0.9)	49.3 (9.6)
Record low °F (°C)	−5 (−21)	6 (−14)	12 (−11)	22 (−6)	29 (−2)	37 (3)	51 (11)	46 (8)	35 (2)	23 (−5)	13 (−11)	0 (−18)	−5 (−21)
Average precipitation inches (mm)	4.34 (110)	3.77 (96)	4.81 (122)	4.29 (109)	3.92 (100)	4.58 (116)	3.97 (101)	4.56 (116)	3.65 (93)	3.93 (100)	3.72 (94)	4.70 (119)	50.24 (1,276)
Average snowfall inches (cm)	0.4 (1.0)	0.0 (0.0)	0.2 (0.51)	0.0 (0.0)	0.0 (0.0)	0.0 (0.0)	0.0 (0.0)	0.0 (0.0)	0.0 (0.0)	0.0 (0.0)	0.0 (0.0)	0.2 (0.51)	0.8 (2.0)
Average precipitation days (≥ 0.01 in)	9.3	8.2	9.5	8.0	7.9	9.2	9.3	8.4	6.6	6.2	7.1	9.1	98.8
Average snowy days (≥ 0.1 in)	0.1	0.0	0.1	0.0	0.0	0.0	0.0	0.0	0.0	0.0	0.0	0.2	0.4
Source: NOAA

== Demographics ==
Historical population
Census	Pop.	Note	%±
1900	365		—
1910	410		12.3%
1920	398		−2.9%
1930	309		−22.4%
1940	352		13.9%
1950	455		29.3%
1960	1,252		175.2%
1970	1,418		13.3%
1980	1,556		9.7%
1990	1,736		11.6%
2000	2,690		55.0%
2010	2,235		−16.9%
2020	2,274		1.7%
U.S. Decennial Census

=== 2020 census ===
Pacolet racial composition
Race	Num.	Perc.
White (non-Hispanic)	1,650	72.56%
Black or African American (non-Hispanic)	427	18.78%
Native American	13	0.57%
Asian	15	0.66%
Other/Mixed	107	4.71%
Hispanic or Latino	62	2.73%

As of the 2020 United States census, there were 2,274 people, 957 households, and 590 families residing in the town.

=== 2010 census ===
As of the census of 2010, there were 2,235 people, 962 households, and 625 families residing in the town. The population density was 750 people per square mile (290 people/km^{2}). There were 962 housing units at an average density of 320.7 per square mile (123.8/km^{2}). The racial makeup of the town was 75.7% White, 21.7% African American, 0.2% Native American, 1.2% Asian, 0.1% Native Hawaiian and Other Pacific Islander 0.1% from other races, and 1.0% from two or more races. Hispanic or Latino of any race were 1.1% of the population.

There were 1,070 households, out of which 26.8% had children under the age of 18 living with them, 46.7% were married couples living together, 16.3% had a female householder with no husband present, and 32.3% were non-families. 29.9% of all households were made up of individuals, and 15.9% had someone living alone who was 65 years of age or older. The average household size was 2.41 and the average family size was 3.00.

In the town, the population was spread out, with 22.3% under the age of 18, 8.4% from 18 to 24, 25.9% from 25 to 44, 24.3% from 45 to 64, and 19.0% who were 65 years of age or older. The median age was 40 years. For every 100 females, there were 88.5 males. For every 100 females age 18 and over, there were 84.1 males.

The median income for a household in the town was $31,494, and the median income for a family was $41,367. Males had a median income of $30,592 versus $22,440 for females. The per capita income for the town was $16,856. About 10.4% of families and 15.3% of the population were below the poverty line, including 18.9% of those under age 18 and 22.6% of those age 65 or over.

== Arts and Culture ==
=== Attractions ===
- Pacolet River Fest, a historic celebration held annually on the third Saturday in October on the Flats by the river. Formerly known as the Indian Summer Festival, the event features live entertainment, crafts, food vendors, and more.
- Pacolet Farmers Market, operating on the second Saturday of every month from May to August.
- Movies by the River, a showing of various family movies by the river on the second Saturday of every month from May to August.
- The Pacolet Amphitheater, a historic amphitheater that is decorated every Christmas using lights and inflatables.
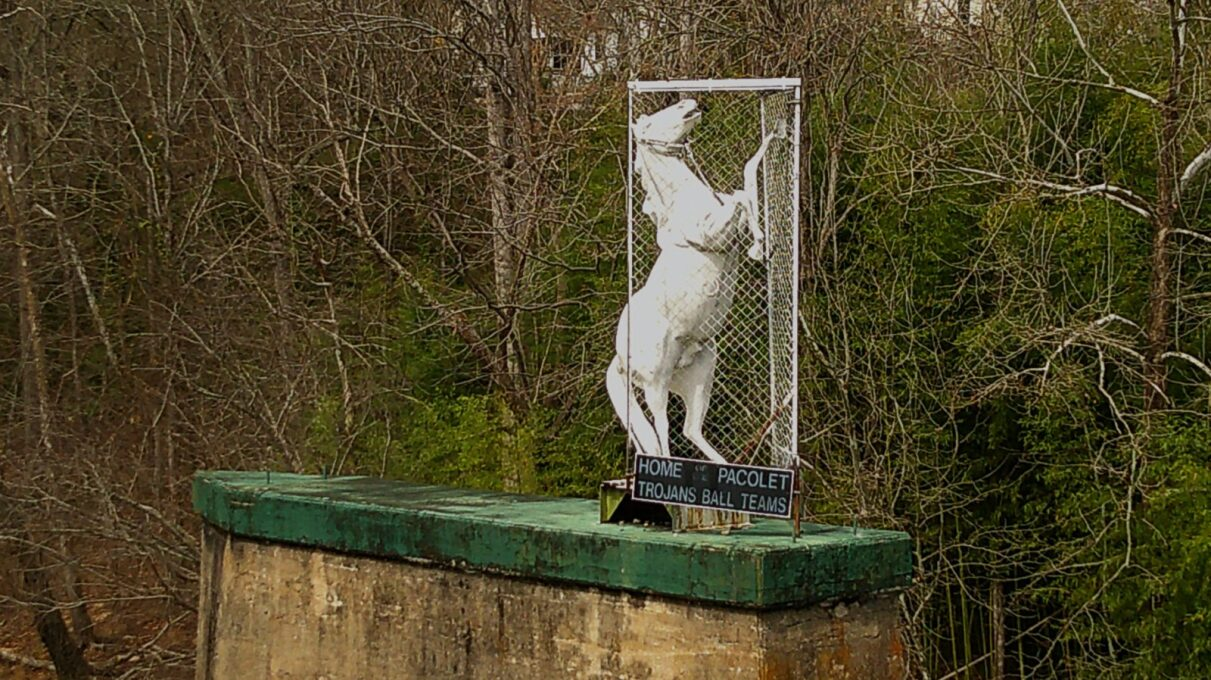
  Pacolet Trojan Horse
- The Pacolet Trojan Horse, a fiberglass statue of a white horse placed atop the foundation of the old bridge, which commemorates the Pacolet Trojans baseball teams.

== Education ==
Pacolet currently has one school, Pacolet Elementary School. The town is in Spartanburg County School District 3. From 1953 to 1970, Pacolet was the home of Benjamin E. Mays Consolidated School, which served Black students in Pacolet in grades 1-6 and all Black students in the district in grades 7-12. After the school's closing, it became a middle school from 1976 to 2021.

Pacolet has a lending library, a branch of the Spartanburg County Public Library.

== Infrastructure ==
=== Transportation ===
==== Major Highways ====
- US 176
- SC 9
- SC 150

== Notable people ==
- George Banks (1938 – 1985), baseball player
- C. Bruce Littlejohn (1913 – 2007), Chief Justice of the South Carolina Supreme Court
- Joe Littlejohn (1908 – 1989), racing driver
- Ricky Smith, member of the National Sporting Clays Association Hall of Fame
- William Westmoreland (1914 – 2005), United States Army general, most notably the commander of United States forces during the Vietnam War from 1964 to 1968
- Ernie White (1916 – 1974), baseball player
- Charles "Spades" Wood (1909 – 1986), baseball player
