= Marysville School =

- U.S. National Register of Historic Places
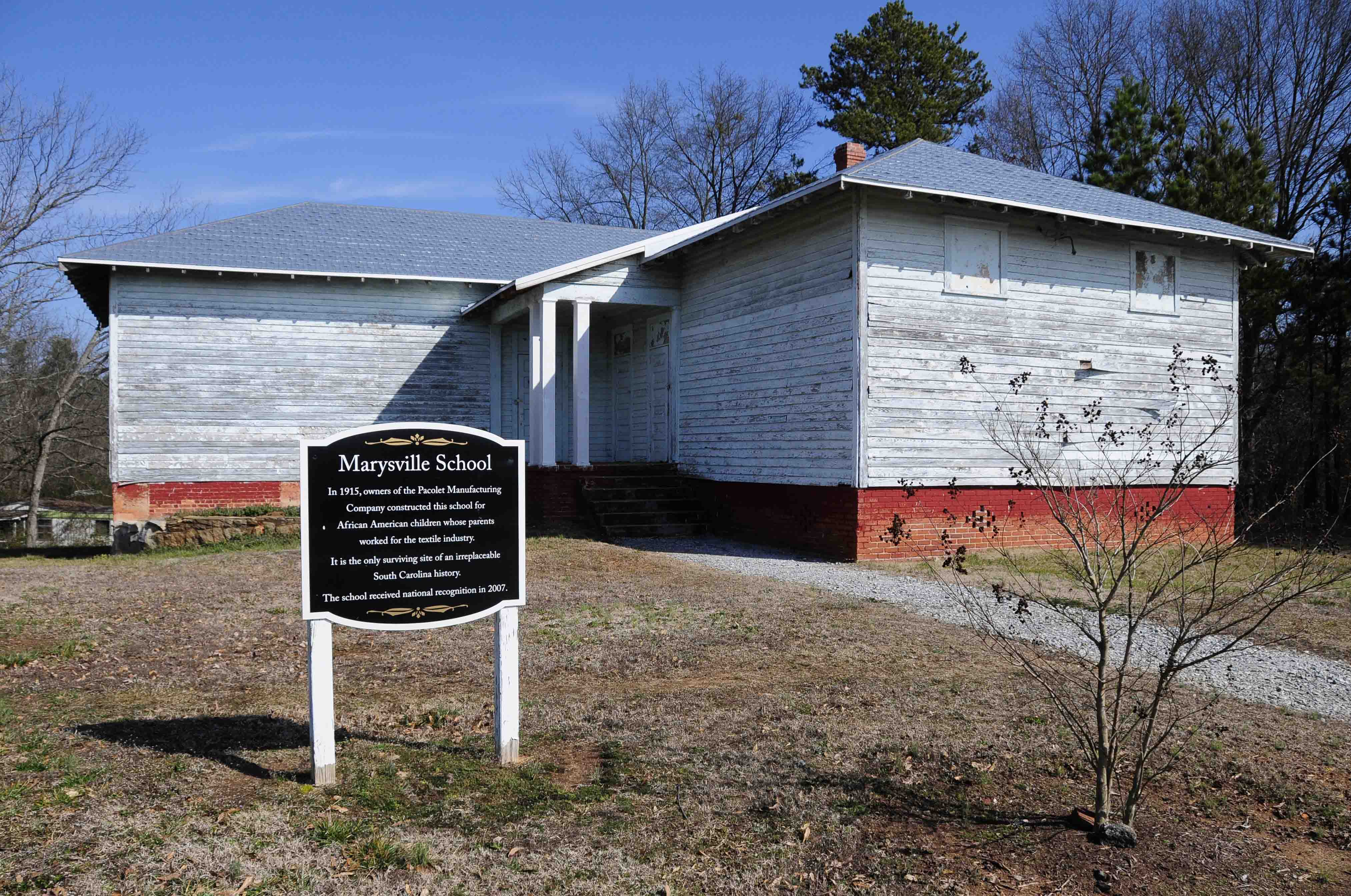
- Maryville School, February 2012

- Location within South Carolina Location within the United States
- Location: Sunny Acres Rd., near Pacolet, South Carolina
- Coordinates: 34°55′6″N 81°45′27″W
- Area: less than one acre
- Built by: Pacolet Manufacturing Co.
- NRHP reference No.: 06001231
- Added to NRHP: January 9, 2007

Marysville School is a historic school building located near Pacolet, Spartanburg County, South Carolina. It built in 1915 by the Pacolet Manufacturing Company to serve the African-American community of Marystown. It is a 1 1/2-story, three room school building in an "L" shape. The school closed in 1954.

It was listed on the National Register of Historic Places in 2007.
