= Pacolet Mill Office =

- U.S. National Register of Historic Places
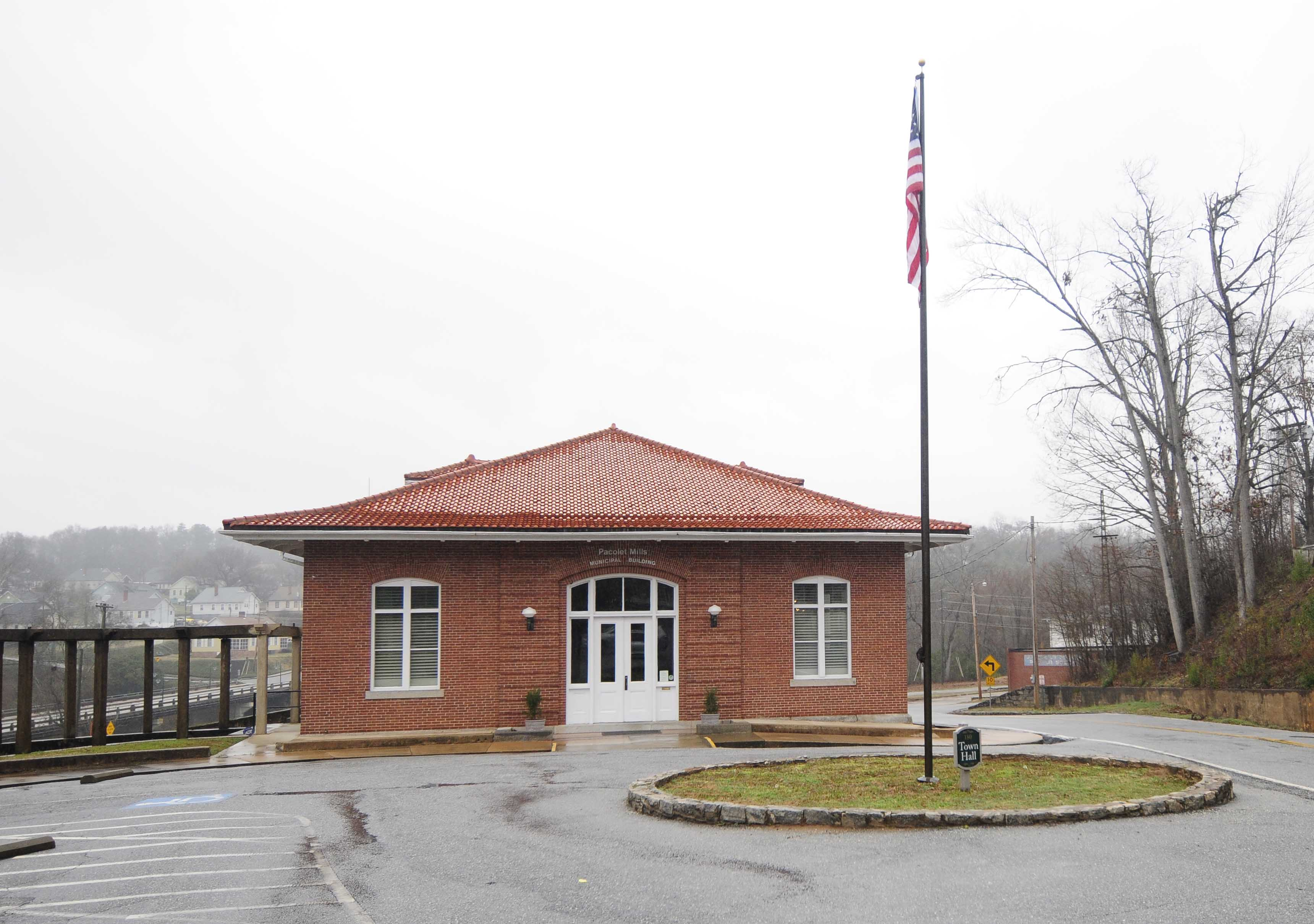
- Pacolet Mill Office, February 2012

- Location within South Carolina Location within the United States
- Location: 180 Montgomery Ave., Pacolet, South Carolina
- Coordinates: 34°55′14″N 81°44′30″W
- Area: less than one acre
- Built: 1908
- Architect: Lockwood, Greene & Co.; Draper, Earle S.
- Architectural style: Renaissance
- NRHP reference No.: 04000760
- Added to NRHP: July 28, 2004

Pacolet Mill Office, also known as Pacolet Municipal Building and Town Hall, is a historic office building located at Pacolet, Spartanburg County, South Carolina. It built in 1908 by the Pacolet Manufacturing Company. It is a one-story, brick building with full-height basement level. It has a low-pitched hip roof with flared eaves and decorative exposed rafter tails. The roof is clad with clay Spanish tile. The site features a curving cast stone or concrete pergola added some time between 1920 and 1927. In 2004, the building became the town hall for the Town of Pacolet.

It was listed on the National Register of Historic Places in 2004.
