= Pacolet Mills Cloth Room and Warehouse =

- U.S. National Register of Historic Places
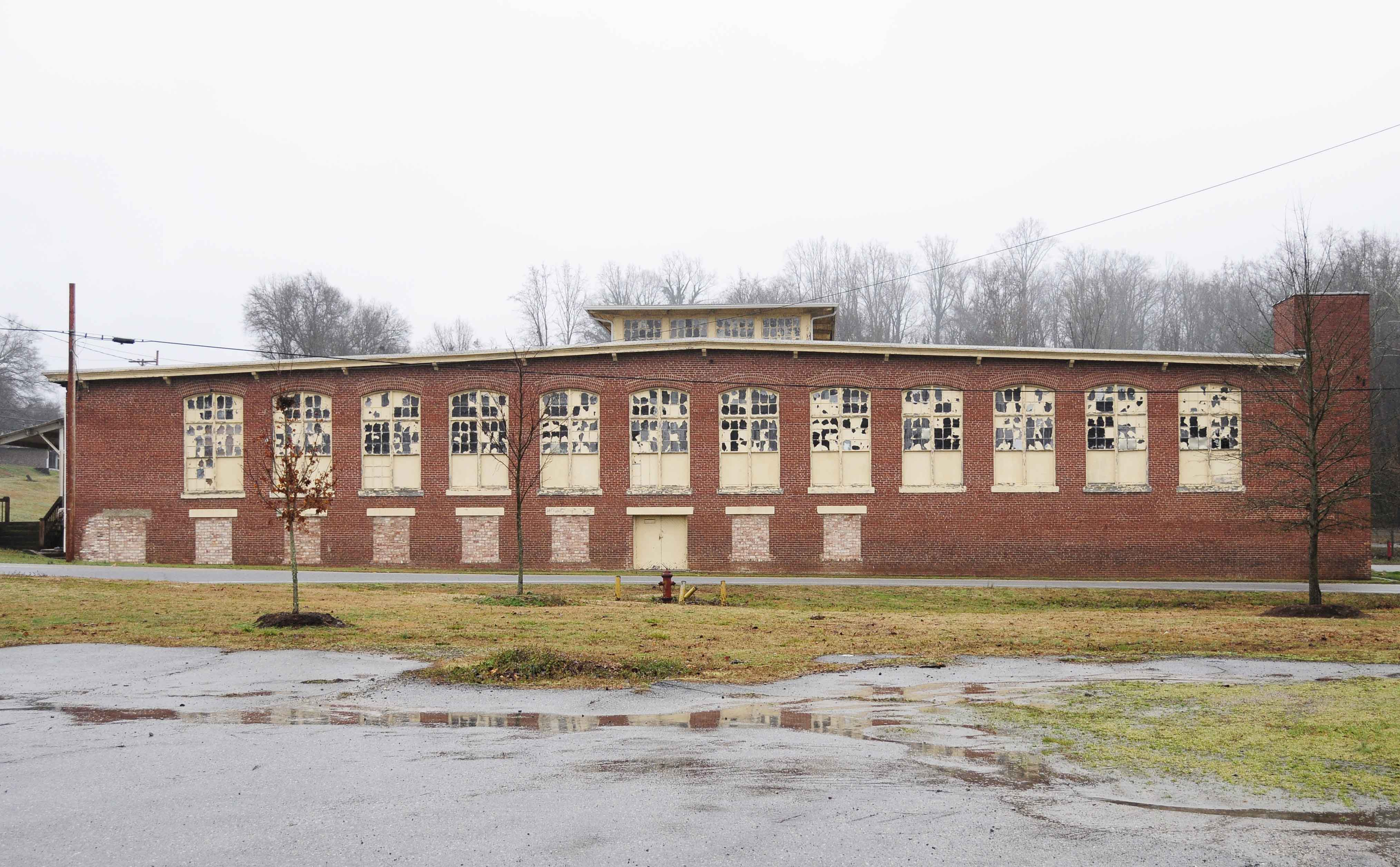
- Pacolet Mills Cloth Room and Warehouse, February 2012

- Location within South Carolina Location within the United States
- Location: 1560 Sunny Acres Rd., Pacolet, South Carolina
- Coordinates: 34°55′11″N 81°44′34″W
- Area: 2.5 acres (1.0 ha)
- Built: 1906-1907
- Architectural style: Late 19th And Early 20th Century American Movements
- NRHP reference No.: 05001571
- Added to NRHP: February 1, 2006

Pacolet Mills Cloth Room and Warehouse is a historic textile mill located at Pacolet, Spartanburg County, South Carolina. It was built in 1906–1907, and consists the 1 1/2-story, brick cloth building with the attached warehouse portion covered with weatherboard and metal. the building features a low-profiled roof and large rounded arch windows. The front portion of the building was used for inspecting cloth prior to shipping, and the rear portion was used as a warehouse.

It was listed on the National Register of Historic Places in 2006.
