= 2023 deaths in the United States (April–June) =

- Decades: 2000s; 2010s; 2020s; 2030s
- See also: History of the United States (2016–present); Timeline of United States history (2010–present); List of years in the United States

The following notable deaths in the United States occurred in April–June 2023. Names are reported under the date of death, in alphabetical order as set out in WP:NAMESORT. A typical entry reports information in the following sequence: Name, age, country of citizenship at birth and subsequent nationality (if applicable), what subject was noted for, year of birth (if known), and reference.

== April ==
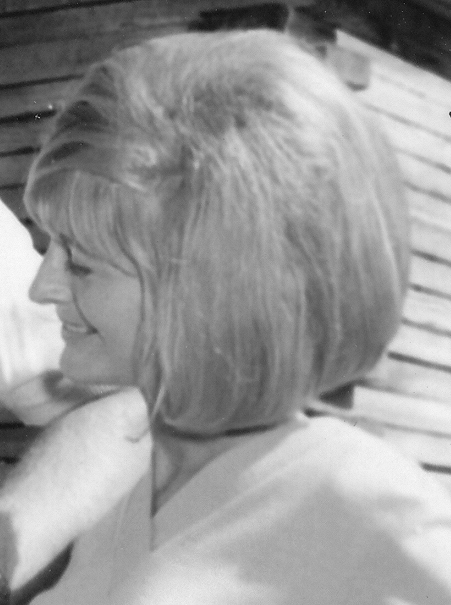
Judy Farrell

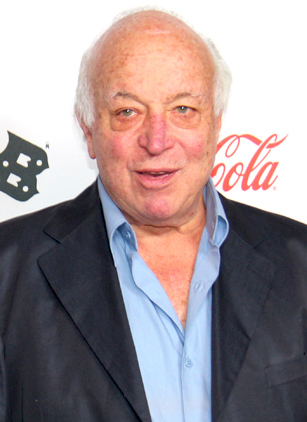
Seymour Stein

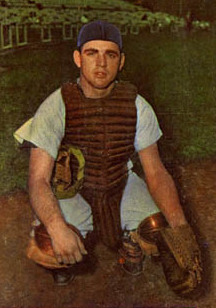
Hobie Landrith

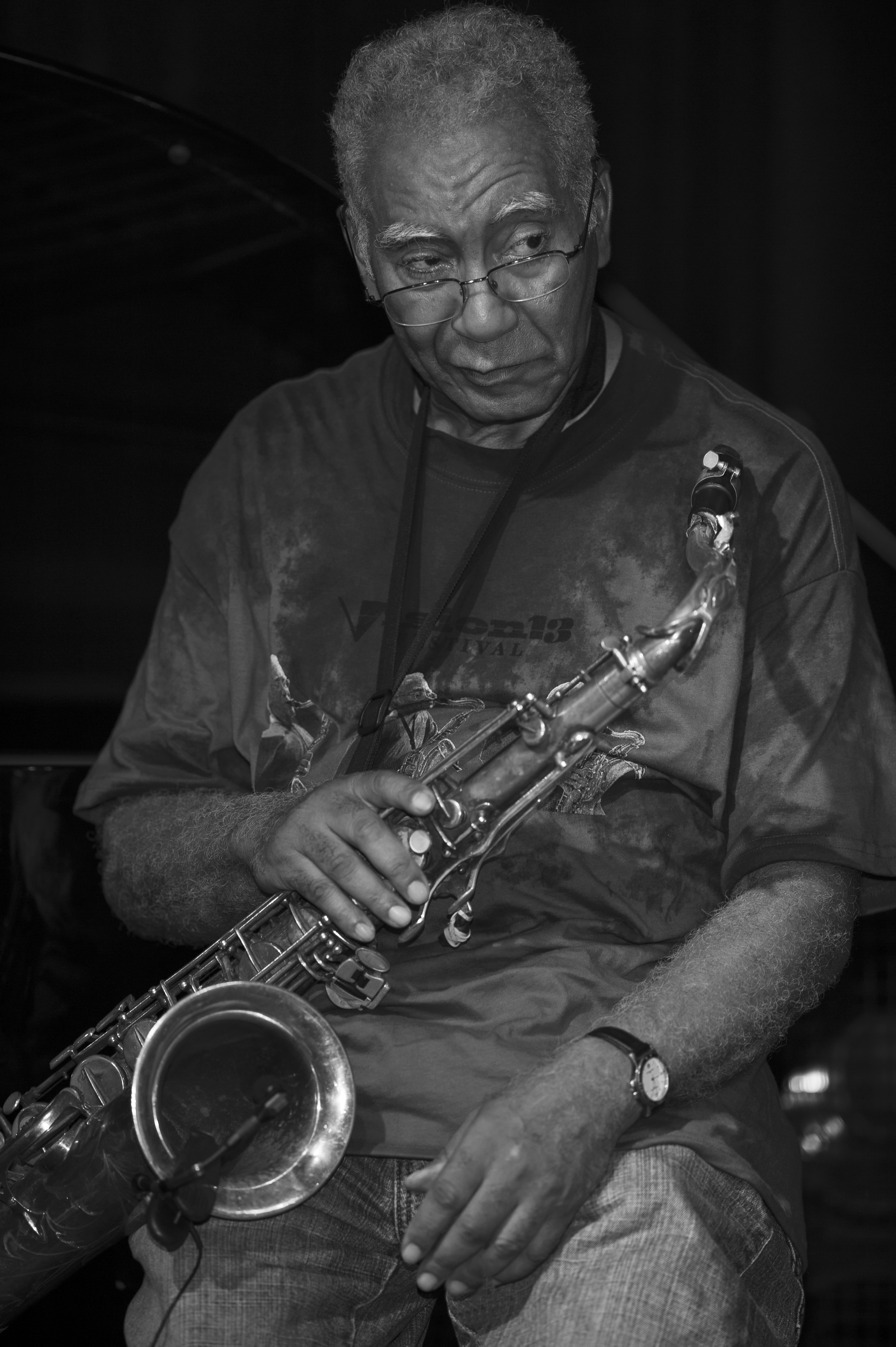
Kidd Jordan

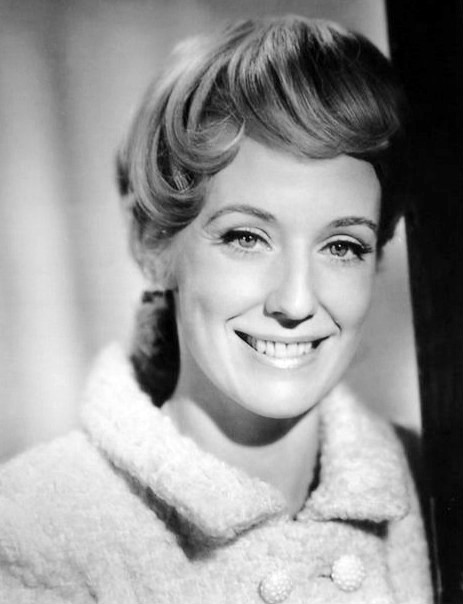
Elizabeth Hubbard

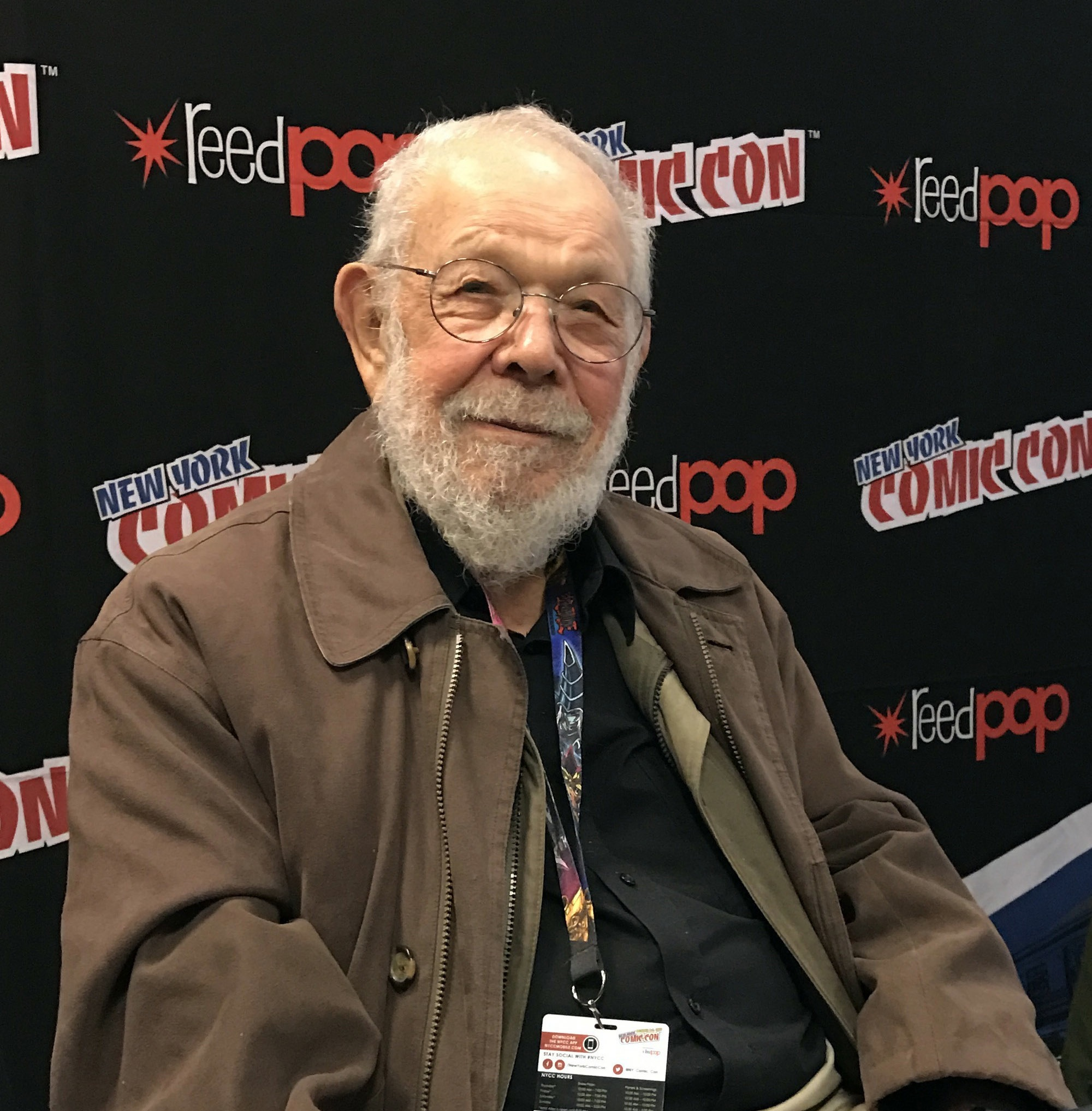
Al Jaffee

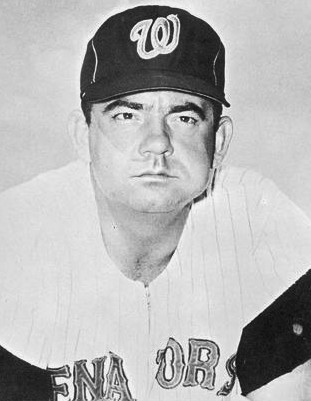
Don Leppert

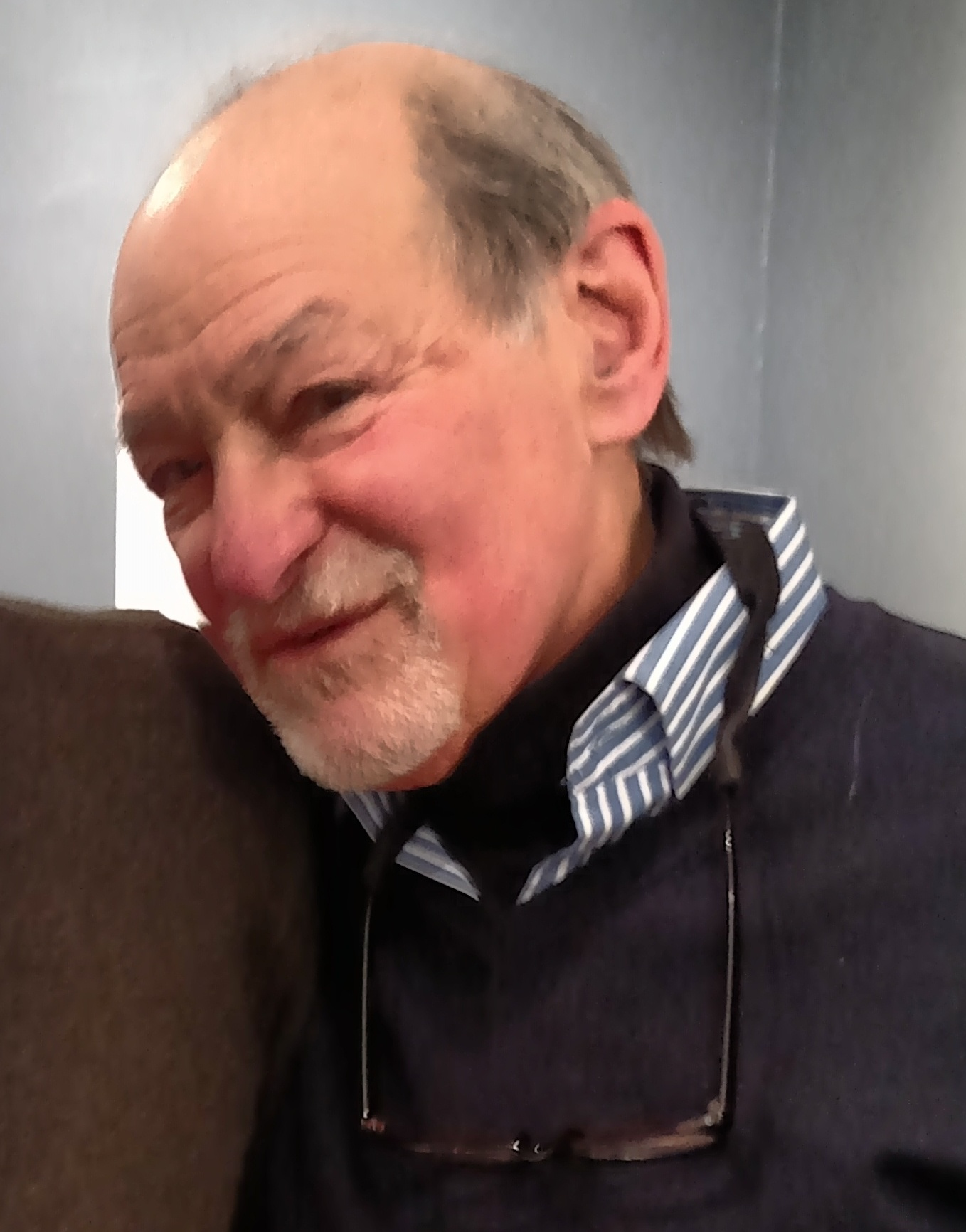
Ed Koren

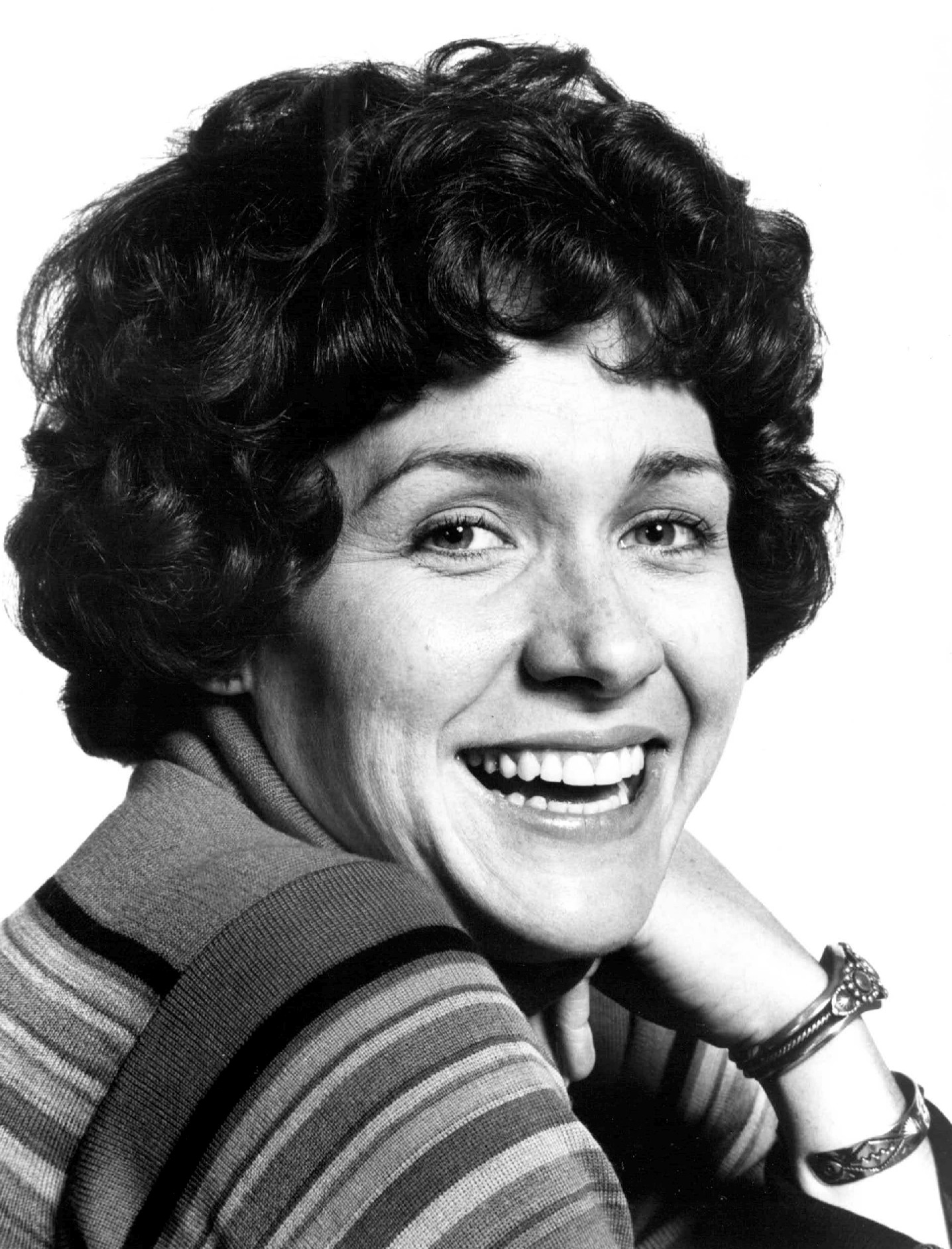
Garn Stephens

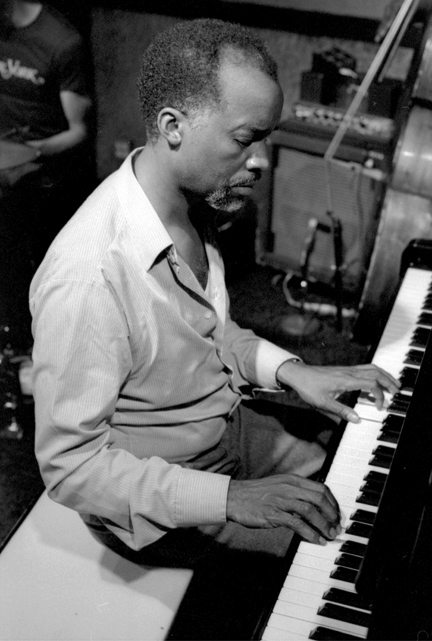
Ahmad Jamal

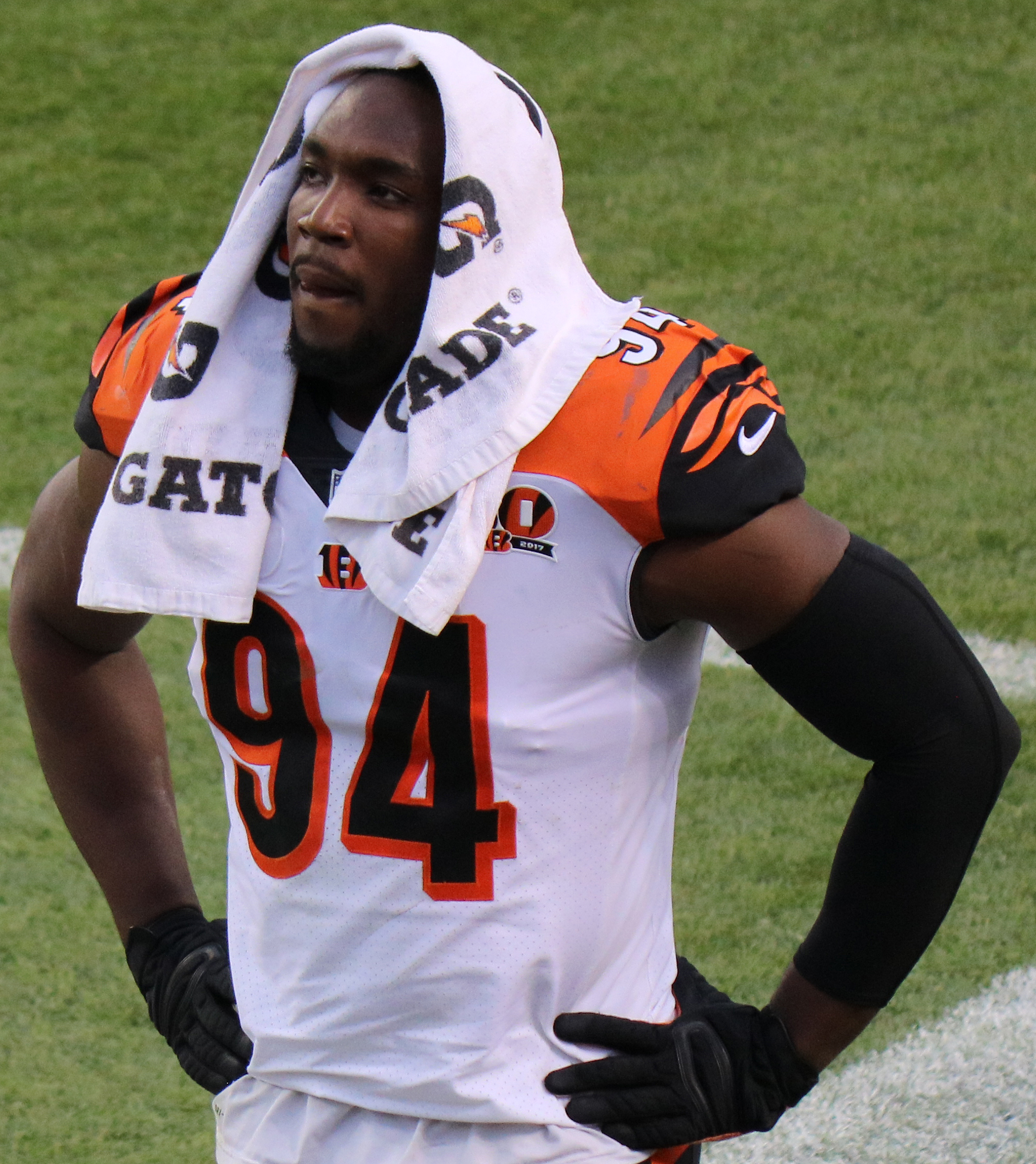
Chris Smith

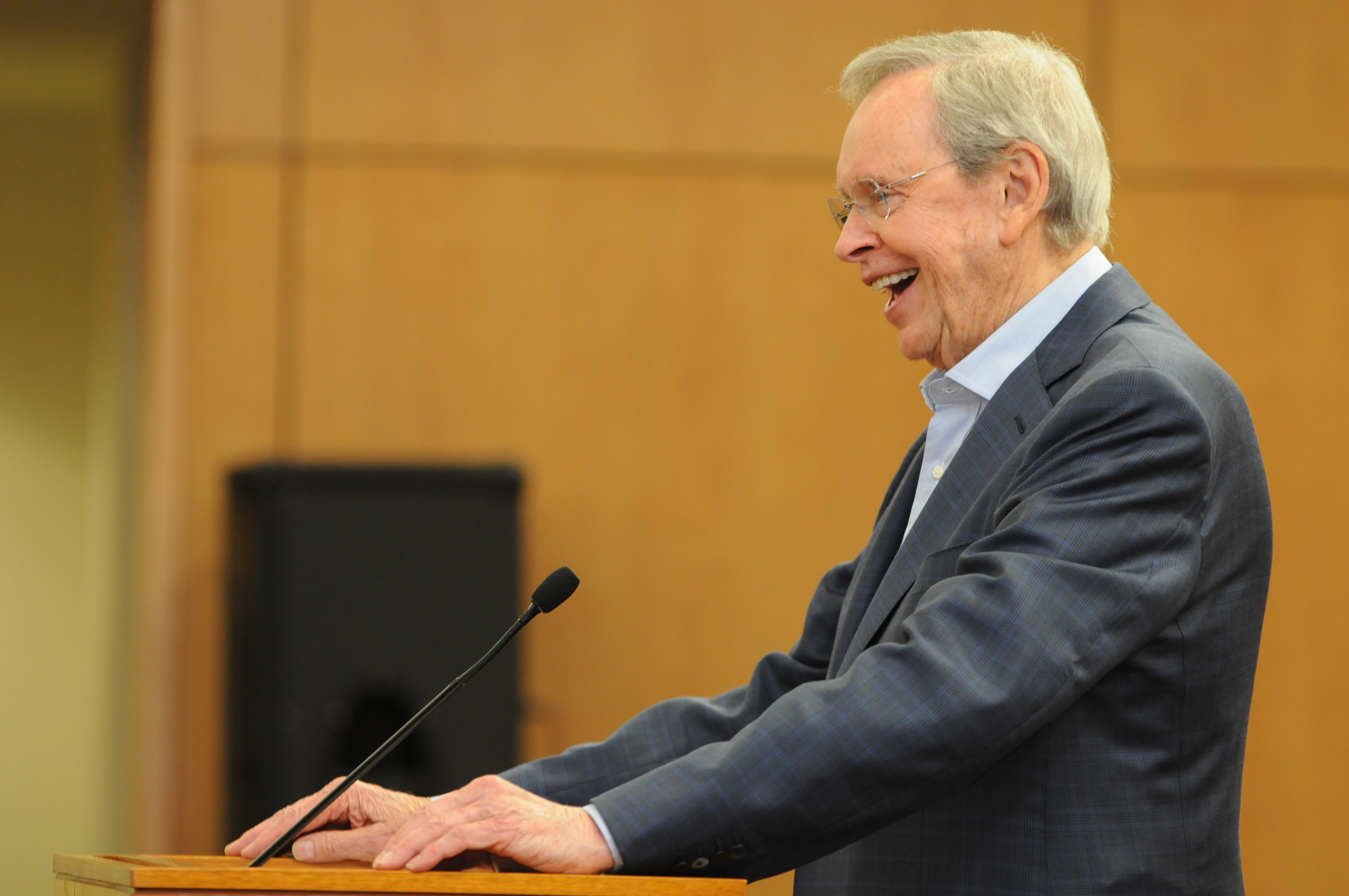
Charles Stanley

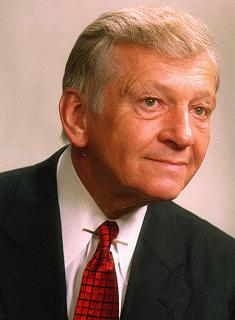
Bud Shuster

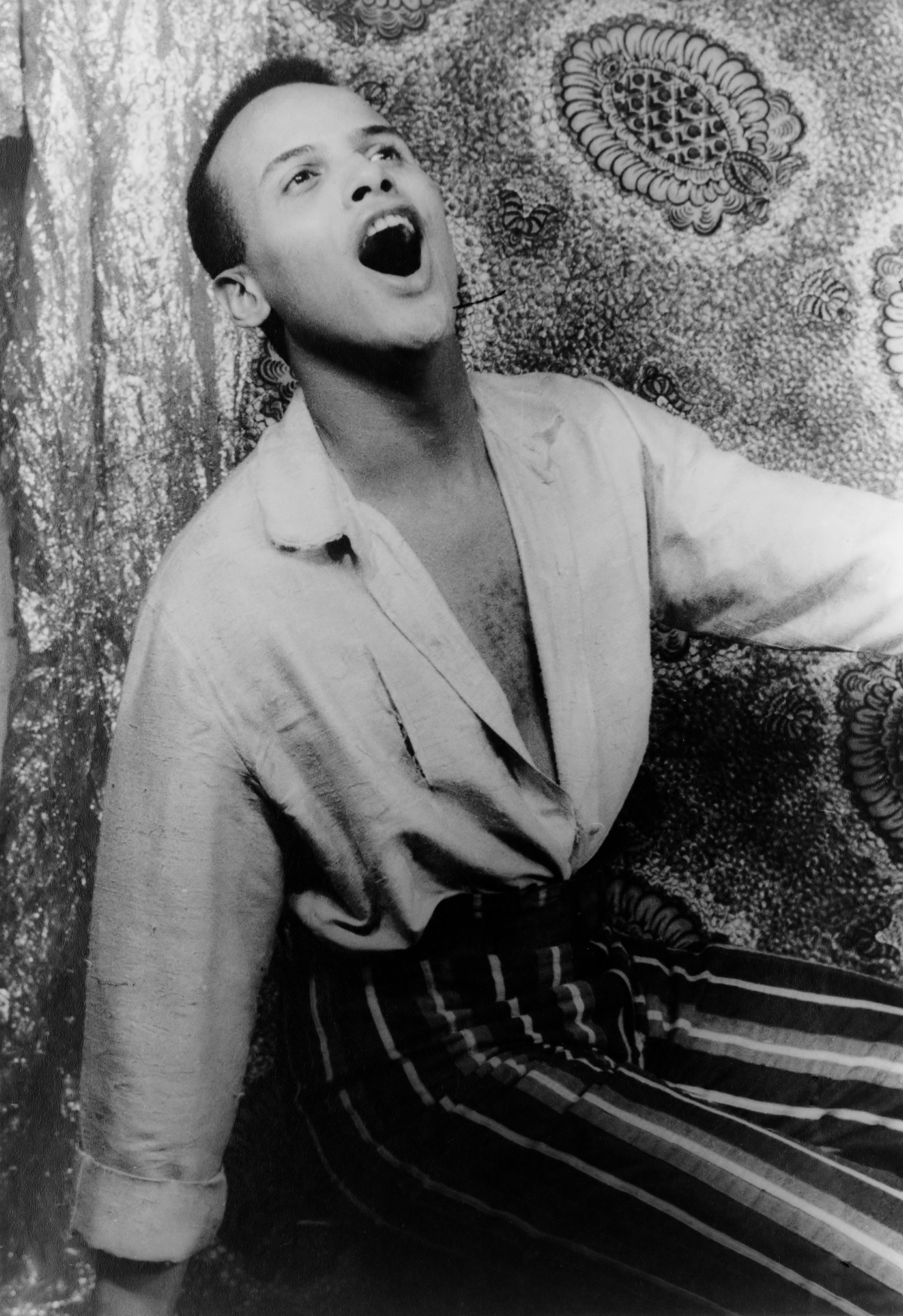
Harry Belafonte

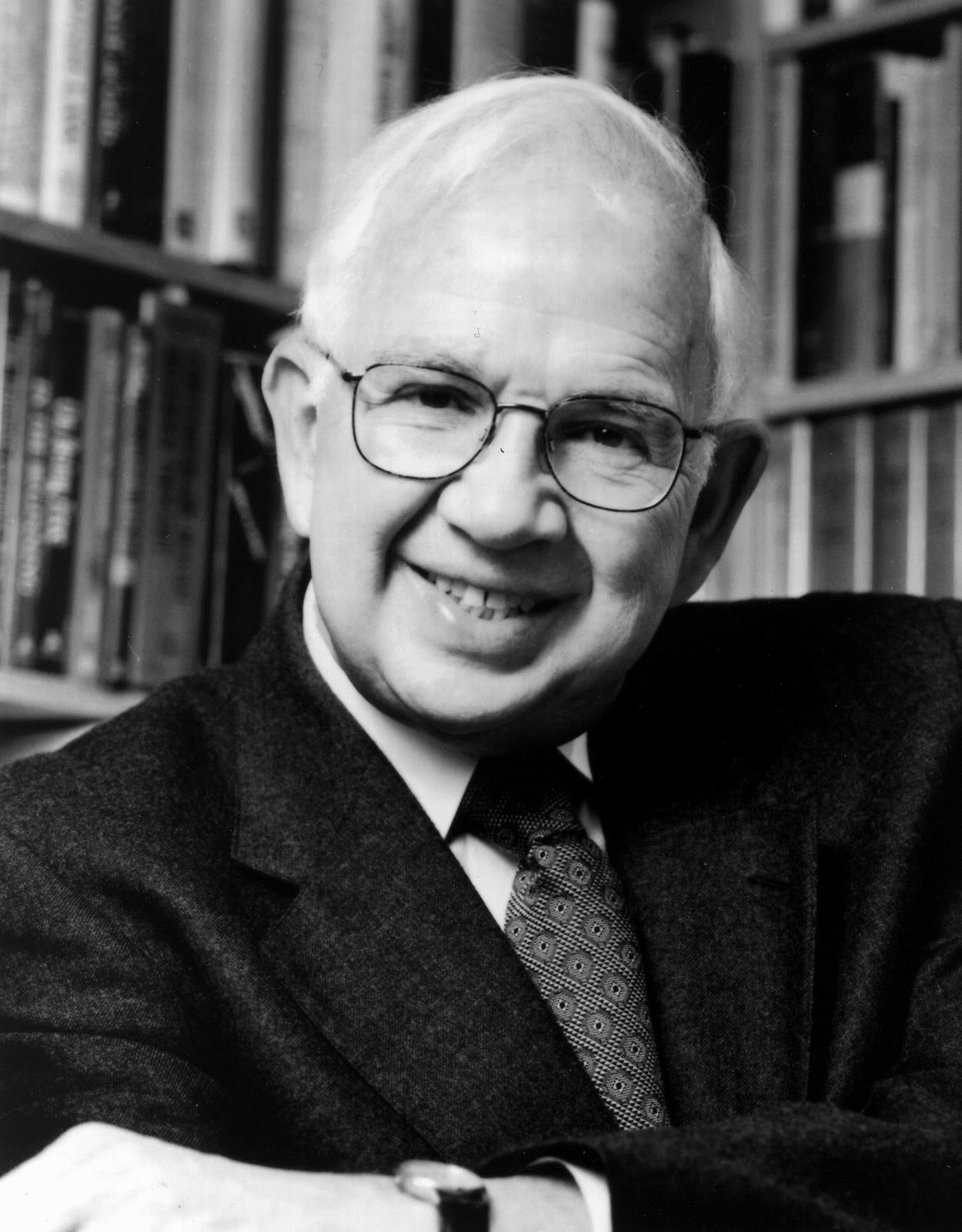
Harold Kushner

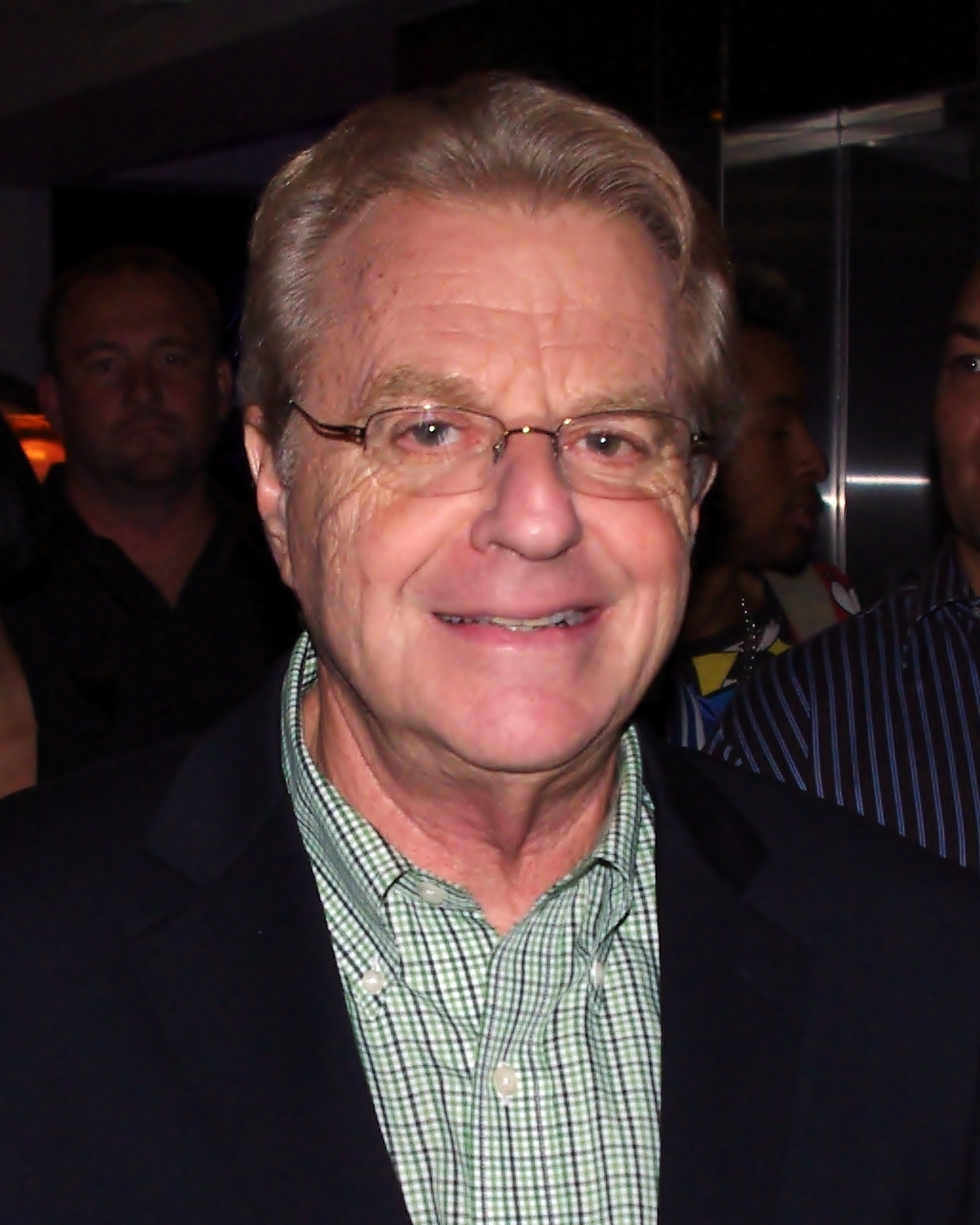
Jerry Springer

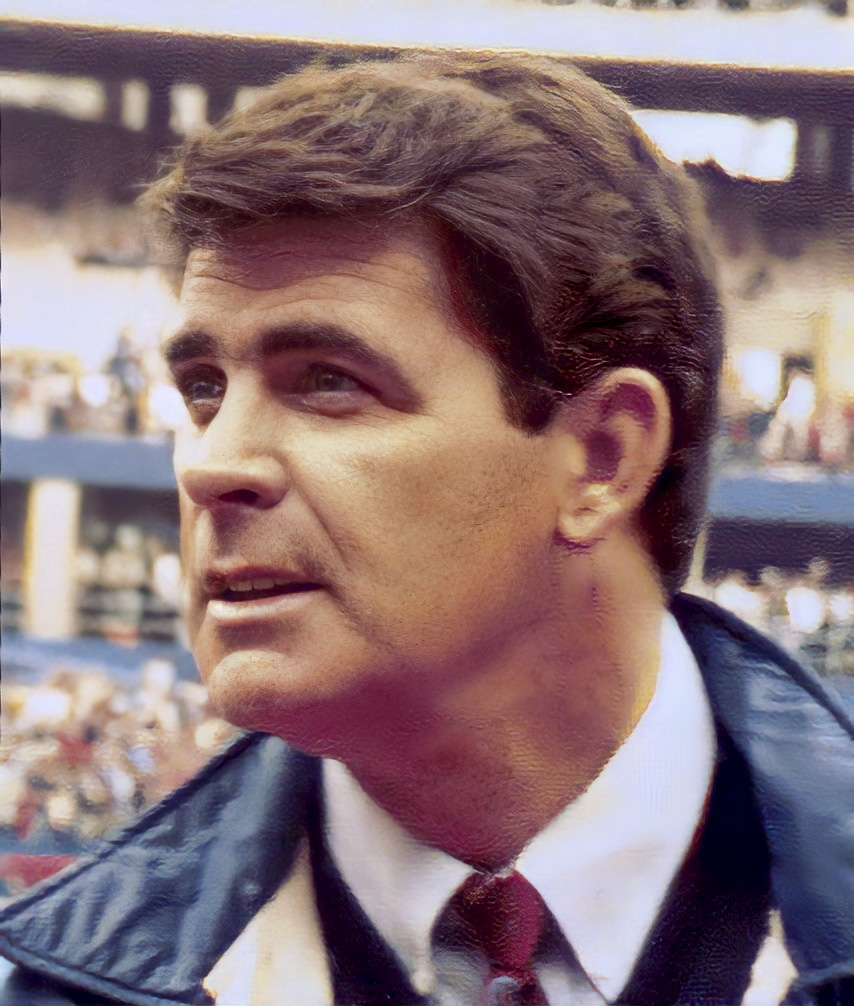
Mike Shannon

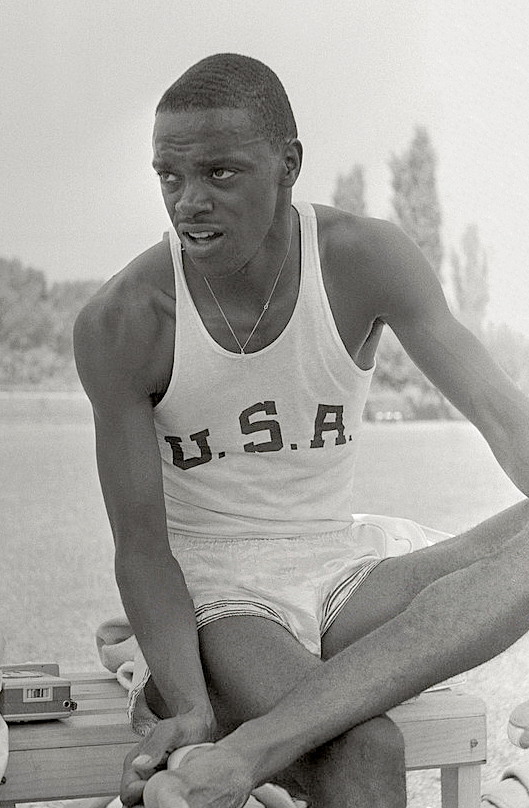
Ralph Boston

- April 1
  - Leonard Abrams, 68, journalist (East Village Eye) (b. 1954)
  - Kwame Brathwaite, 85, photojournalist and activist (b. 1938)
  - Alicia Shepard, 69, journalist and writer (b. 1953)
  - Roger Vinson, 83, jurist, judge (since 1983) and chief judge (1997–2004) of the U.S. District Court for Northern Florida (b. 1940)
- April 2
  - Toni Elling, 94, burlesque dancer (b. 1928)
  - Judy Farrell, 84, actress (M*A*S*H) and screenwriter (Port Charles) (b. 1938)
  - Frank Gilliam, 89, football player (Iowa Hawkeyes, Winnipeg Blue Bombers) (b. 1934)
  - Seymour Stein, 80, Hall of Fame music executive, co-founder of Sire Records (b. 1942)
  - Garn Stephens, 78, actress (Phyllis, Halloween III: Season of the Witch, The Sunshine Boys) (b. 1944)
- April 3
  - William M. Barker, 81, jurist, chief justice of the Tennessee Supreme Court (1995–2009) (b. 1941)
  - Neal Boenzi, 97, photographer (b. 1925)
  - David Finfer, 80, film editor (The Fugitive, Bill & Ted's Bogus Journey, The Santa Clause 3: The Escape Clause) (b. 1942)
  - Heklina, 54, drag queen and actor (b. 1968)
  - Jane LaTour, 76, labor activist and journalist (b. 1946)
  - Roy McGrath, 53, public official and fugitive, chief of staff to the governor of Maryland (2020) (b. 1969)
  - Herb Rule, 87, politician, member of the Arkansas House of Representatives (b. 1937)
- April 4
  - David Bartholomae, 75, scholar (b. 1947)
  - Ethan Boyes, 44, track cyclist (b. 1978)
  - Craig Breedlove, 86, racecar driver (b. 1937)
  - Bob Lee, 43, tech executive (Cash App, Square, Inc.) (b. 1979)
  - Vivian Trimble, 59, musician (Luscious Jackson, Dusty Trails, Kostars) (b. 1963)
  - Billy Waugh, 93, Special Forces army soldier (b. 1929)
- April 5
  - Harrison Bankhead, 68, jazz double bassist (b. 1955)
  - Bill Butler, 101, cinematographer (Jaws, One Flew Over the Cuckoo's Nest, Grease) (b. 1921)
  - Nancy Detert, 78, politician, member of the Florida Senate (2008–2016) and House of Representatives (1998–2006) (b. 1944)
  - Cedric Henderson, 57, basketball player (Atlanta Hawks, Albany Patroons, Olympique Antibes) (b. 1965)
  - Leon Levine, 85, businessman, founder of Family Dollar (b. 1937)
  - Booker Newberry III, 67, singer ("Love Town") and keyboardist (b. 1956)
- April 6
  - Jim Caldwell, 80, basketball player (New York Knicks) (b. 1943)
  - Katie Cotton, 57–58, communications chief (Apple Inc.) (b. 1965)
  - Bill Hellmuth, 69, architect, chairman of HOK (since 2005) (b. 1953)
  - Hobie Landrith, 93, baseball player (New York Mets, Cincinnati Reds, San Francisco Giants) (b. 1930)
  - Kent C. Nelson, 85, businessman (b. 1937)
  - Mimi Sheraton, 97, food critic (The New York Times, The Daily Beast) (b. 1926)
- April 7
  - Ben Ferencz, 103, Hungarian-born lawyer (Einsatzgruppen trial) (b. 1920)
  - Carl Fischer, 98, art director and photographer (b. 1924)
  - Billy Hahn, 69, basketball coach (West Virginia Mountaineers) (b. 1953)
  - Tracy Johnson, 56, football player (Houston Oilers, Atlanta Falcons, Seattle Seahawks) (b. 1966)
  - Kidd Jordan, 87, jazz saxophonist (b. 1935)
  - Harry Lorayne, 96, magician (b. 1926)
  - Steve H. Murdock, 74, sociologist, director of the United States Census Bureau (2008–2009) (b. 1948)
  - Rachel Pollack, 77, science fiction writer (Unquenchable Fire, Doom Patrol) (b. 1945)
  - John Regan, 71, bass guitarist (Frehley's Comet) (b. 1951)
  - James W. Valentine, 96, evolutionary biologist (b. 1926)
- April 8
  - Elizabeth Hubbard, 89, actress (The Doctors, As the World Turns, Ordinary People) (b. 1933)
  - Michael Lerner, 81, actor (Barton Fink, Eight Men Out, X-Men: Days of Future Past) (b. 1941)
  - Edward L. Rissien, 98, production company executive and producer (Snow Job, Saint Jack, Castle Keep) (b. 1924)
  - Mickey Slaughter, 81, football quarterback (Denver Broncos) (b. 1941)
  - Norman H. Stahl, 92, jurist, judge of the U.S. Court of Appeals for the First Circuit (since 1992) and the U.S. District Court for New Hampshire (1990–1992) (b. 1931)
- April 9
  - Karl Berger, 88, German-born jazz pianist, composer, and educator (Creative Music Studio) (b. 1935)
  - Bruria David, 84, American-born Israeli rebbetzin, founder of Beth Jacob Jerusalem (b. 1938)
  - Alexander J. Dessler, 94, planetary scientist (b. 1928)
  - Donald W. Ernst, 89, film editor (The Brave Little Toaster, The Lord of the Rings) and producer (Fantasia 2000) (b. 1934)
  - Paul Hinrichs, 97, baseball player (Boston Red Sox) (b. 1925)
  - Chuck Morris, 46, percussionist (Lotus) (b. 1976) (body discovered on this date)
  - Fred Pancoast, 90, football coach (Vanderbilt Commodores, Memphis State Tigers, Tampa Spartans) (b. 1932)
  - Dick Springer, 75, politician, member of the Oregon House of Representatives (1981–1989) and Senate (1989–1995) (b. 1948)
  - Valda Setterfield, 88, British-born dancer, pneumonia.
  - James Timlin, 95, Roman Catholic prelate, auxiliary bishop (1976–1984) and bishop (1984–2003) of Scranton (b. 1927)
  - Tom Yurkovich, 87, Olympic ice hockey player (1964) (b. 1935)
- April 10
  - Jane Davis Doggett, 93, graphic designer (b. 1929)
  - Richard Ieyoub, 78, politician, attorney general of Louisiana (1992–2004) (b. 1944)
  - Al Jaffee, 102, cartoonist (Mad, Trump, Humbug) (b. 1921)
  - Frank Lasky, 81, football player (New York Giants, Montreal Alouettes) (b. 1941)
  - Ronald Whyte, 80, jurist, judge of the U.S. District Court for Northern California (since 1992) (b. 1942)
  - Rick Wolff, 71, writer and radio host (b. 1951)
- April 11
  - Carol Locatell, 82, actress (Friday the 13th: A New Beginning, Coffy, The Family Stone) (b. 1940)
  - Jerry Mander, 86, activist and author (Four Arguments for the Elimination of Television) (b. 1936)
  - Lesley Swick Van Ness, 42, television news anchor (WGEM) (b. 1980)
  - Donald Voet, 84, biochemist (b. 1938)
- April 12
  - Ivo Babuška, 97, Czech-born mathematician (Babuška–Lax–Milgram theorem, Ladyzhenskaya–Babuška–Brezzi condition) (b. 1926)
  - Carolyn Long Banks, 82, civil rights activist and politician, member of the Atlanta City Council (1980–1997) (b. 1940)
  - James Bradley, 67, basketball player (Pallacanestro Trieste) (b. 1955)
  - Louis Gaskin, 56, convicted murderer (b. 1967)
  - David Hurles, 78, gay pornography distributor (b. 1944)
  - Megan Terry, 90, playwright (b. 1932)
  - Doug Tibbles, 83, television writer (Bewitched, My Three Sons) and drummer (The Stone Coyotes) (b. 1940)
  - Blair Tindall, 63, oboeist and journalist (b. 1960)
  - G. I. Williamson, 97, theologian, pastor, and author (b. 1925)
- April 13
  - Mike Baxes, 92, baseball player (Kansas City Athletics) (b. 1930)
  - Norm Kent, 73, attorney and gay rights activist (b. 1949)
  - Larry LeGrande, 83, baseball player (Memphis Red Sox, Detroit Stars, Kansas City Monarchs) (b. 1939)
  - Don Leppert, 91, baseball player (Pittsburgh Pirates, Washington Senators) (b. 1931)
  - Marilyn McReavy, 78, Olympic volleyball player (1968) (b. 1944)
- April 14
  - Mark Arneson, 73, football player (St. Louis Cardinals) (b. 1949)
  - Bill Bradbury, 73, politician, secretary of state of Oregon (1999–2009), member (1985–1995) and president (1993–1994) of the State Senate (b. 1949)
  - Dave Frost, 70, baseball player (California Angels) (b. 1952)
  - Ed Koren, 87, cartoonist (The New Yorker), (b. 1935)
  - Lonnie Napier, 82, politician, member of the Kentucky House of Representatives (1985–2013) (b. 1940)
  - James M. Skibo, 63, archaeologist (b. 1960)
  - George Verwer, 84, evangelist, founder of Operation Mobilisation (b. 1938)
- April 15
  - Peter Badie, 97, jazz bass player (b. 1925)
  - Kaylin Gillis, 20, homicide victim (b. 2003 or 2002)
  - Maryellen Goodwin, 58, politician, member of the Rhode Island Senate (since 1987) (b. 1964)
  - Lynda Myles, 83, television writer (Santa Barbara, Loving, As the World Turns), actress and playwright (b. 1939)
  - Bill Thomas, 91, college basketball coach (Missouri State Bears) (b. 1931)
- April 16
  - Paul Aizley, 87, politician, member of the Nevada Assembly (2009–2017) (b. 1936)
  - Chuck Ciprich, 81, racing driver, cancer (b. 1941)
  - Ahmad Jamal, 92, jazz pianist (b. 1930)
  - Darryl Lenox, 56–57, comedian (b. 1966)
- April 17
  - Jim Gillis, 64, journalist and newspaper columnist (The Newport Daily News) (b. 1958)
  - James Melcher, 83, hedge fund manager and Olympic fencer (1972) (b. 1939)
  - Randy Seiler, 76, attorney, U.S. attorney for the district of South Dakota (2015–2017) (b. 1946)
  - Chris Smith, 31, football player (Jacksonville Jaguars, Cincinnati Bengals, Cleveland Browns) (b. 1992)
  - April Stevens, 93, singer ("Deep Purple", "Whispering"), Grammy winner (1964) (b. 1929)
  - Nikita Storojev, 73, Russian-born operatic singer (b. 1950)
  - Ronald R. Thomas, 74, academic administrator, president of the University of Puget Sound (2003–2016) (b. 1949)
- April 18
  - Alfred L. Goldberg, 80, biochemist and academic (b. 1942)
  - Joel Hochberg, 87, businessman, president of Rare (b. 1935)
  - Willie McCarter, 76, basketball player (Los Angeles Lakers, Portland Trail Blazers) and coach (Detroit Mercy Titans) (b. 1946)
  - Don McIlhenny, 88, football player (Detroit Lions, Green Bay Packers, Dallas Cowboys) (b. 1934)
  - Charles Stanley, 90, pastor and televangelist, president of the Southern Baptist Convention (1984–1986) and founder of In Touch Ministries (b. 1932)
- April 19
  - Bob Berry, 81, football player (Minnesota Vikings, Atlanta Falcons) (b. 1942)
  - Robert Dean, 67, Olympic handball player (1976) (b. 1955)
  - Todd Haimes, 66, artistic director (b. 1956)
  - Ron "Patch" Hamilton, 72, Christian singer-songwriter, preacher, and voice actor (b. 1950)
  - Jeremy Nobis, 52, Olympic alpine skier (1994) (b. 1970)
  - Otis Redding III, 59, singer (The Reddings) (b. 1963)
  - Richard Riordan, 92, investment banker, businessman and politician, mayor of Los Angeles (1993–2001) (b. 1930) (subscription required)
  - Bud Shuster, 91, politician, member of the U.S. House of Representatives (1973–2001) (b. 1932) (subscription required)
  - Dave Wilcox, 80, Hall of Fame football player (San Francisco 49ers) (b. 1942)
- April 20
  - John Wright, 79, film editor (The Hunt for Red October, Speed, X-Men) (b. 1943)
- April 21
  - Ernie Barrett, 93, basketball player (Boston Celtics) (b. 1929)
  - Kandy Cordova, 86, politician, member of the New Mexico House of Representatives (2001–2007).
  - John A. Curry, 88, academic administrator, president of Northeastern University (1989–1996) (b. 1934)
  - Emily Meggett, 90, chef and author (b. 1932)
  - Ken Potts, 102, World War II veteran, survivor of the attack on the USS Arizona (b. 1921)
  - Ted Richards, 76, cartoonist (b. 1946)
- April 22
  - Herb Douglas, 101, Olympic long jumper (1948) (b. 1922)
  - Emanuel V. Soriano, 86, Philippine-born engineer and academic (b. 1936)
- April 23
  - Tori Bowie, 32, athlete, Olympic champion (2016) (b. 1990)
  - Keith Gattis, 52, country music singer, songwriter, and producer (b. 1970)
  - Yvonne Jacquette, 88, painter (b. 1934)
  - Alton H. Maddox Jr., 77, lawyer (b. 1945)
  - Robert Patrick, 85, playwright, poet and lyricist (b. 1937)
  - Frank Shu, 79, Chinese-born astrophysicist (density wave theory), president of the National Tsing Hua University (2002–2006) and member of the National Academy of Sciences (b. 1943)
  - Dick Towers, 92, football coach (Southern Illinois Salukis) (b. 1931)
  - Isaac Wiley Jr., 69, drummer (Dazz Band) (b. 1954)
- April 24
  - David E. Carter, 80, entrepreneur and writer (b. 1943)
  - Lilian Day Jackson, 63, singer (Spargo) (b. 1959)
  - Mike Pride, 76, journalist and writer (b. 1946)
  - Gilbert Sheldon, 96, Roman Catholic prelate, bishop of Steubenville (1992–2002) and auxiliary bishop of Cleveland (1976–1992) (b. 1926)
  - Dennis Ribant, 81, baseball player (New York Mets, Pittsburgh Pirates, Detroit Tigers) (b. 1941)
  - Casper R. Taylor Jr., 88, politician, speaker (1994–2003) and member (1975–2003) of the Maryland House of Delegates (b. 1934)
- April 25
  - Frank Agrama, 93, Egyptian-born film director (Queen Kong, Dawn of the Mummy) and producer, founder of Harmony Gold USA (b. 1930)
  - Harry Belafonte, 96, musician ("The Banana Boat Song", "Jump in the Line"), actor (Odds Against Tomorrow), and civil rights activist (b. 1927)
  - Carolyn Bryant Donham, 88, storekeeper, accusation led to murder of Emmett Till (b. 1934)
  - Billy "The Kid" Emerson, 97, singer-songwriter ("Red Hot", "When It Rains, It Really Pours") (b. 1925)
  - Ralph Humphrey, 79, rock drummer (The Mothers of Invention) (b. 1944)
  - Pamela Turnure, 85, press secretary (Jacqueline Kennedy) (b. 1937)
- April 26
  - Jerry Apodaca, 88, politician, governor of New Mexico (1975–1979) and chair of the PCPFS (1978–1980) (b. 1934)
  - Sonny Gordon, 57, football player (Tampa Bay Buccaneers, Hamilton Tiger-Cats, Saskatchewan Roughriders) (b. 1965)
  - Stew Leonard Sr., 93, businessman and grocer, founder of Stew Leonard's (b. 1929)
- April 27
  - Dick Groat, 92, baseball player (Pittsburgh Pirates) (b. 1930)
  - Harold Kushner, 88, rabbi and author (When Bad Things Happen to Good People, Overcoming Life's Disappointments, When All You've Ever Wanted Isn't Enough) (b. 1935)
  - Gerald Nesbitt, 91, football player (Ottawa Rough Riders, Arkansas Razorbacks) (b. 1931)
  - Jerry Springer, 79, television host (The Jerry Springer Show) and politician, mayor of Cincinnati (1977–1978) (b. 1944)
- April 28
  - LeRoy Carhart, 81, physician, subject of After Tiller (b. 1941)
  - Claude Gray, 91, country music singer-songwriter ("Family Bible") (b. 1932)
  - Vincent Stewart, 64, Jamaican-born Marine Corps general, director of the Defense Intelligence Agency (2015–2017) (b. 1958)
  - Ben Tompkins, 93, football referee (NFL) (b. 1929)
- April 29
  - Edward J. Garcia, 94, jurist, judge of the U.S. District Court for Eastern California (since 1984) (b. 1928)
  - Janet G. Mullins Grissom, 73, lobbyist, White House director of political affairs (1992–1993), assistant secretary of state for legislative affairs (1989–1992) (b. 1949)
  - Larry Rivers, 73, basketball player (Harlem Globetrotters) (b. 1950)
  - Don Sebesky, 85, composer, arranger, and conductor (b. 1937)
  - Mike Shannon, 83, baseball player (St. Louis Cardinals) (b. 1939)
- April 30
  - Ralph Boston, 83, long jumper, Olympic champion (1960) (b. 1939)
  - Havre de Grace, 15, Thoroughbred racehorse (b. 2007)
  - Lance Ten Broeck, 67, professional golfer and caddie (b. 1956)

== May ==
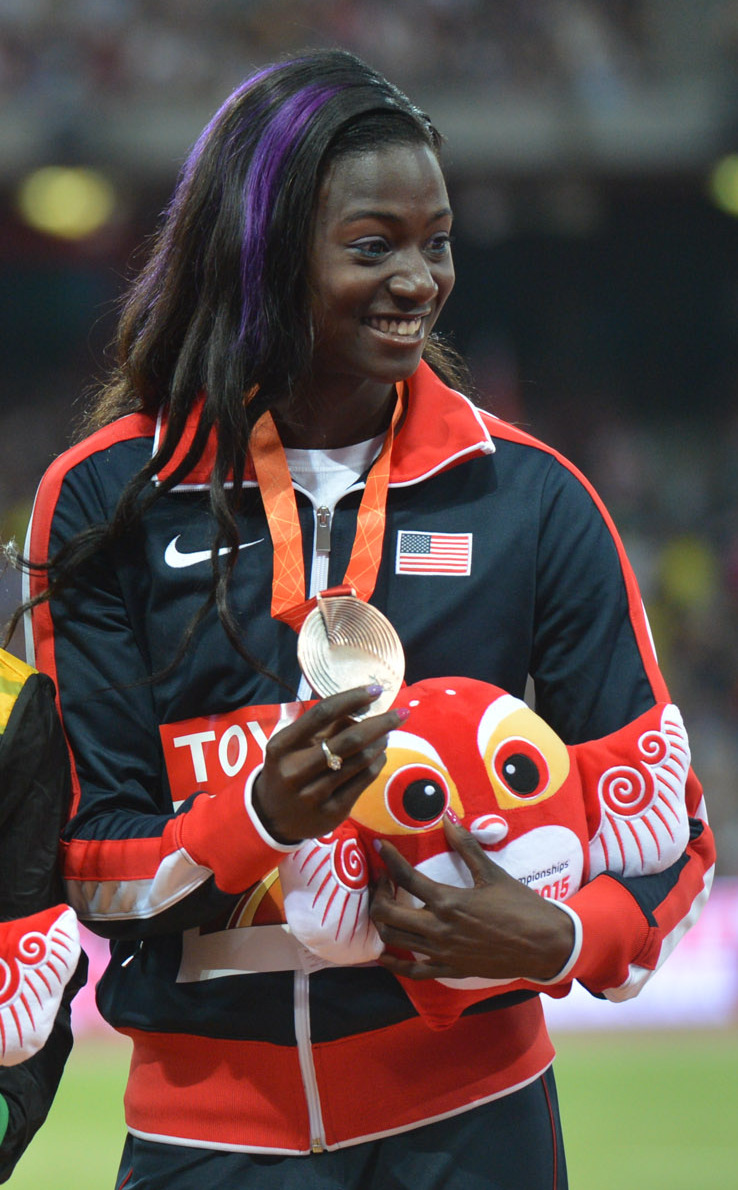
Tori Bowie

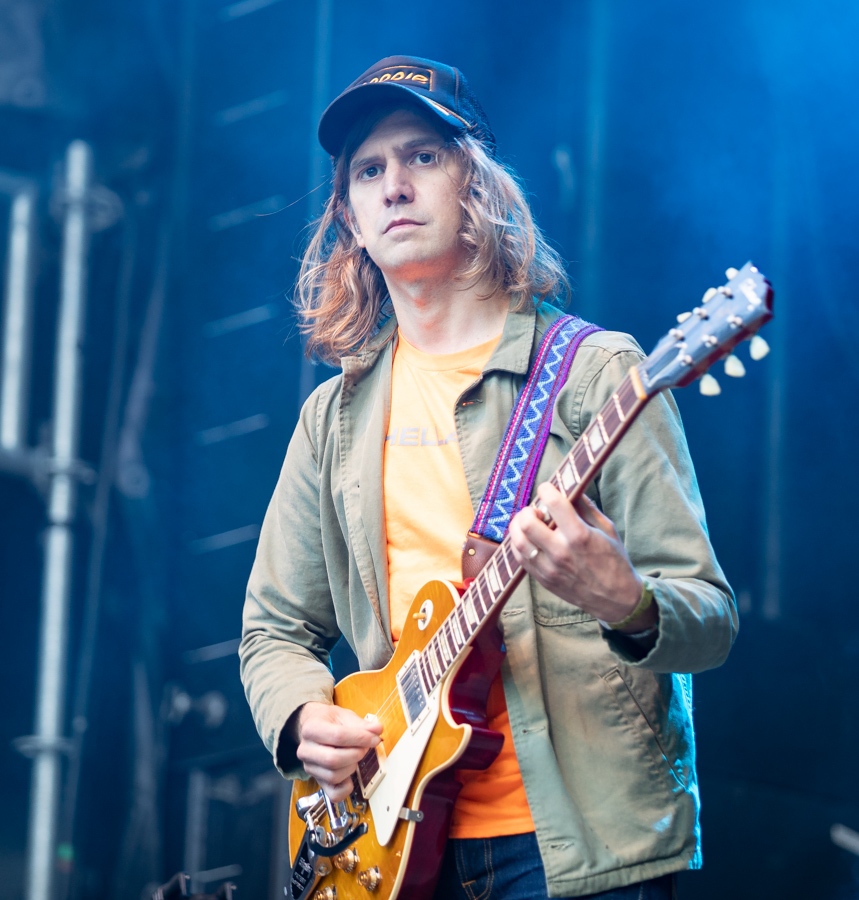
Rob Laakso

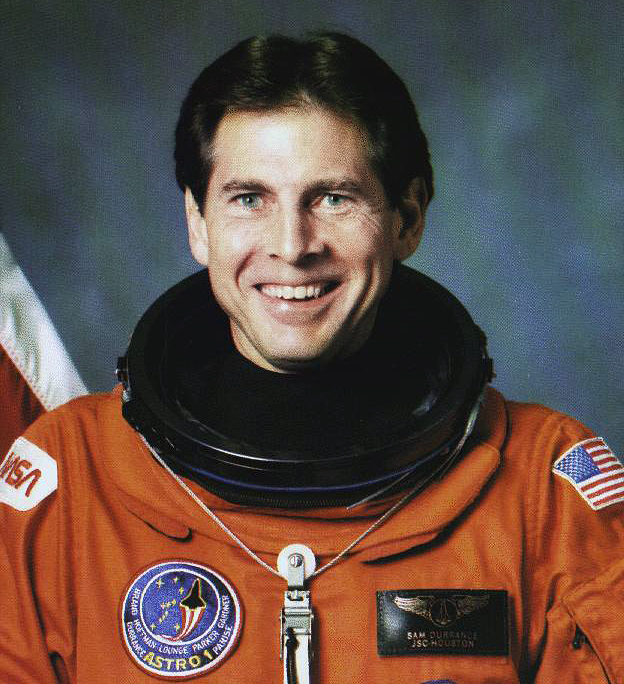
Samuel T. Durrance

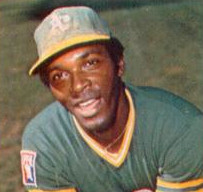
Vida Blue

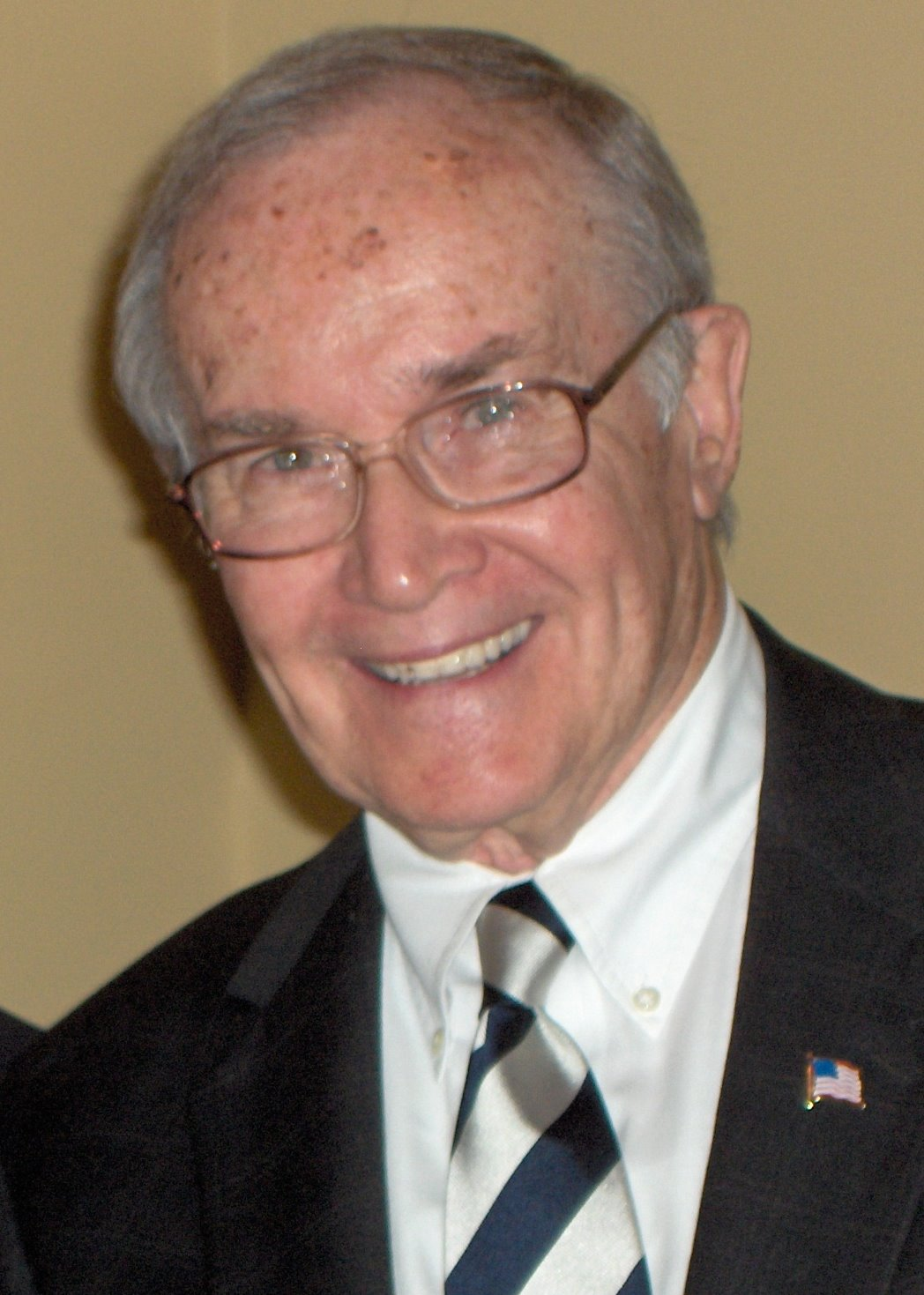
Newton N. Minow

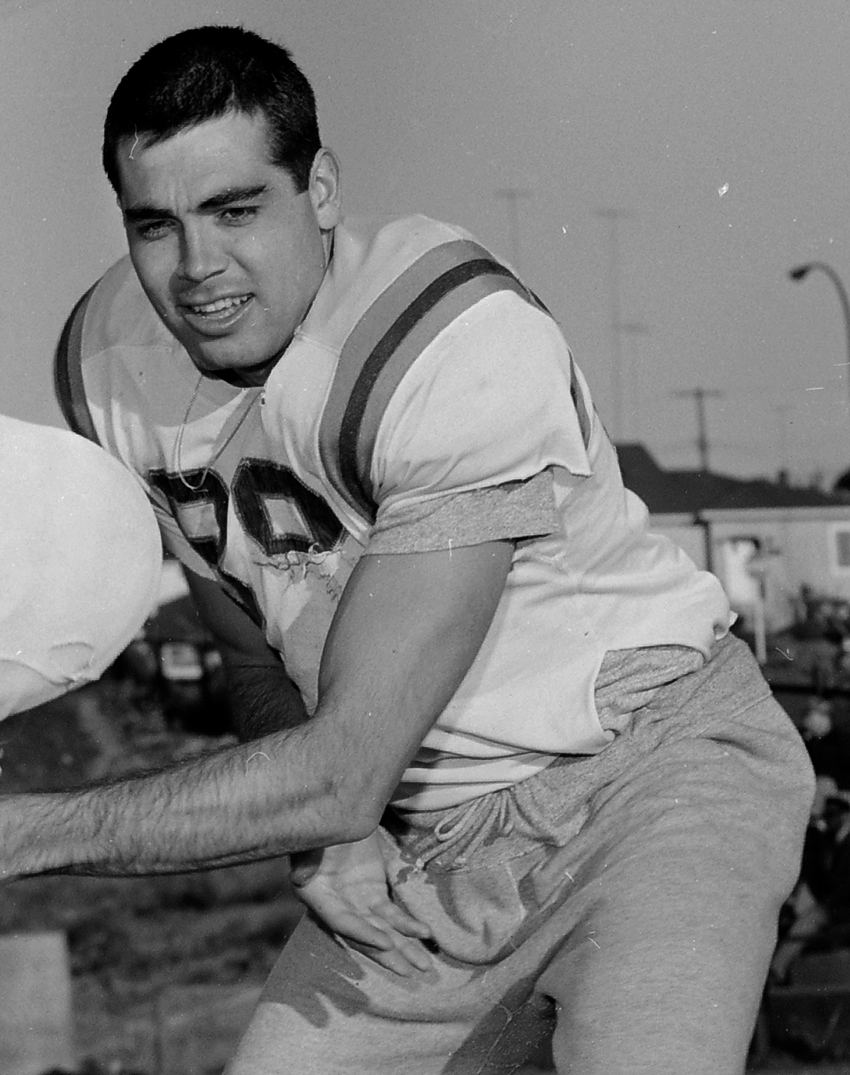
Joe Kapp

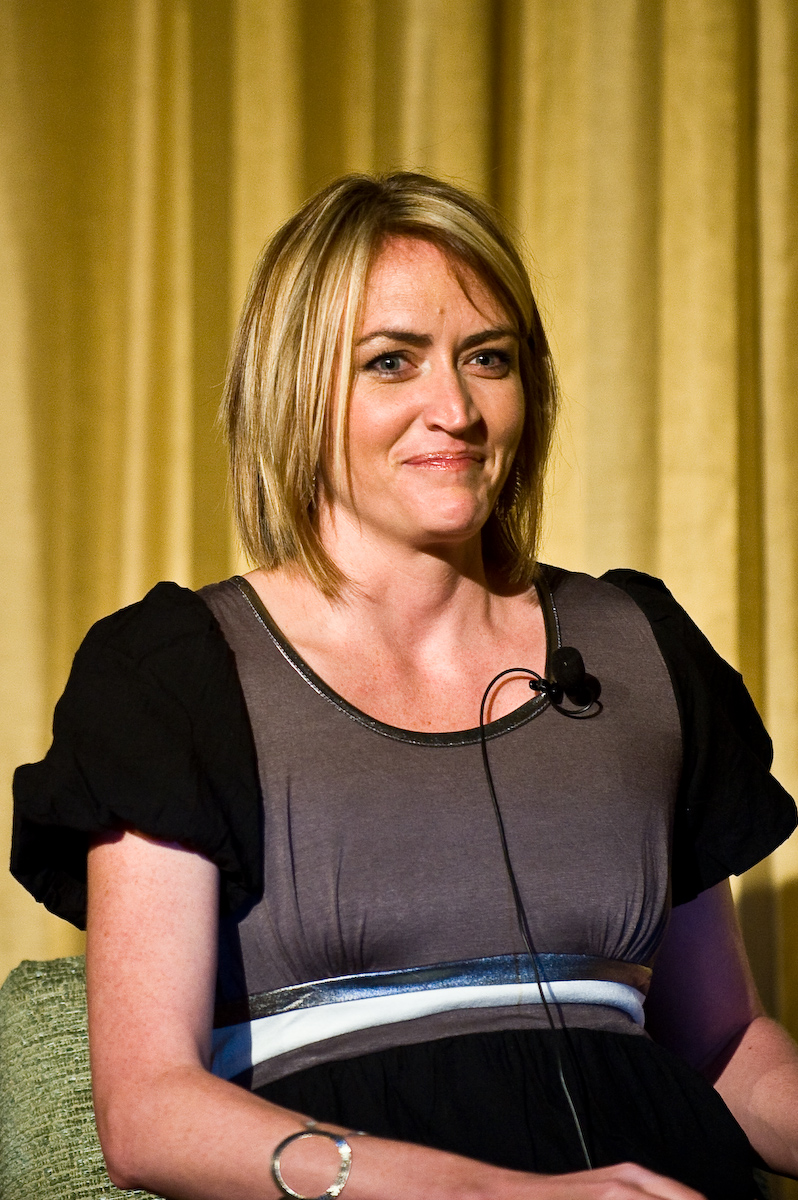
Heather Armstrong

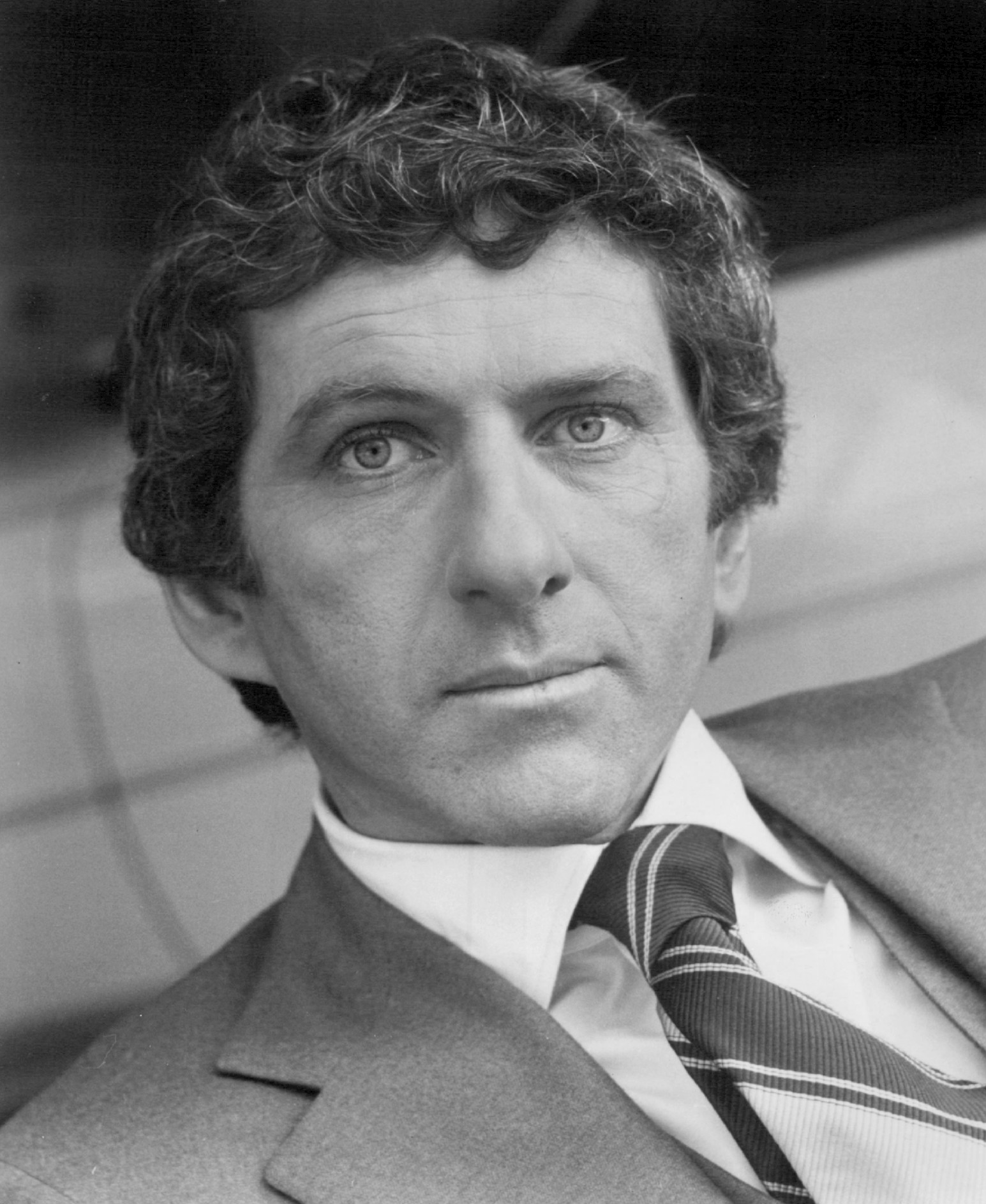
Barry Newman

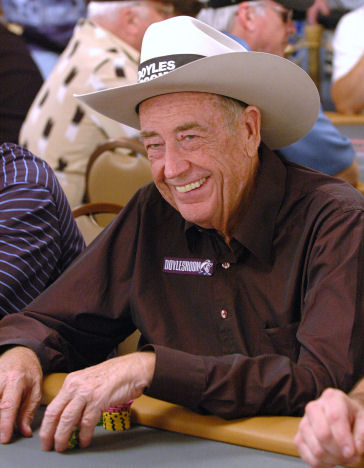
Doyle Brunson

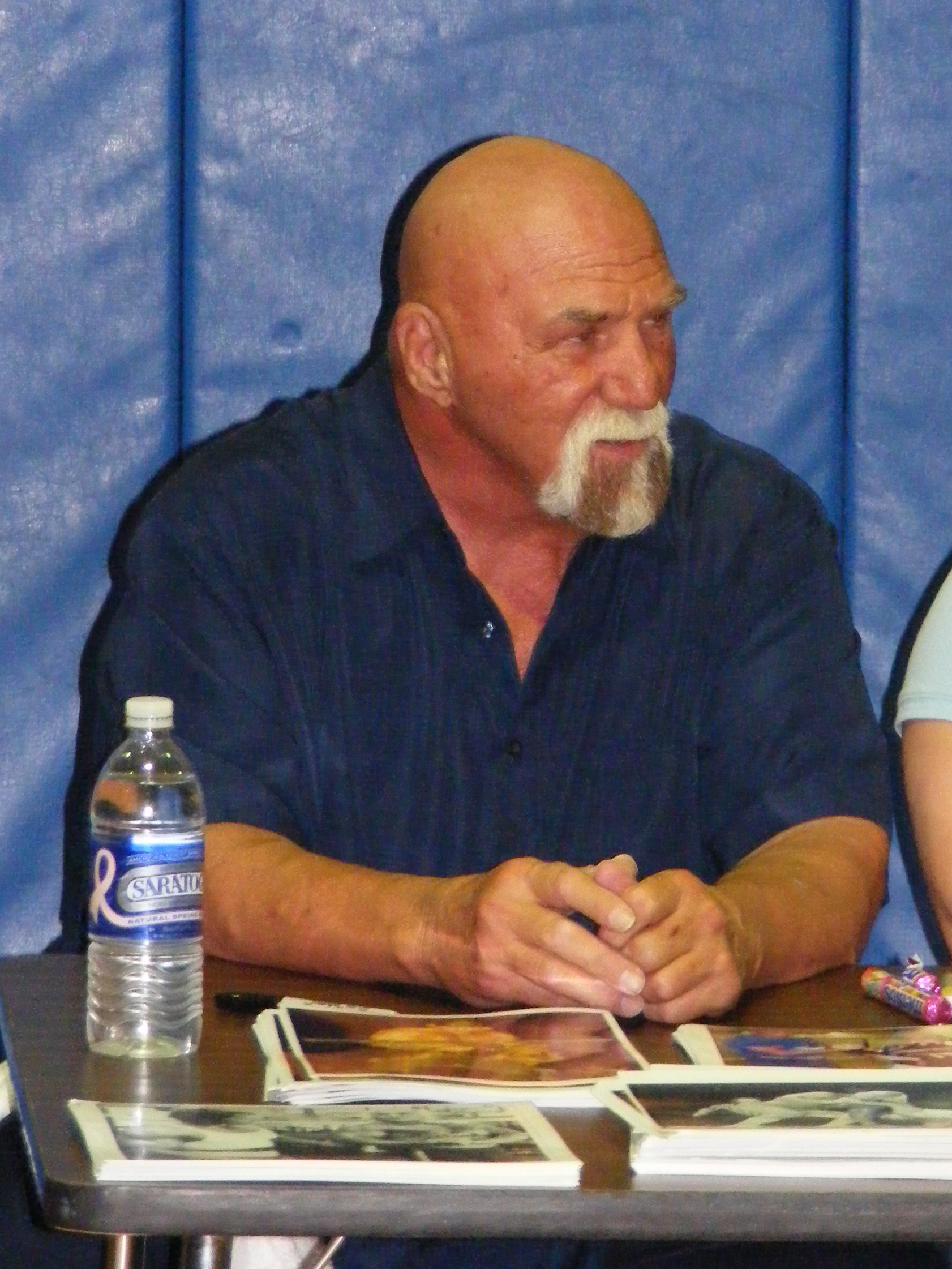
Superstar Billy Graham

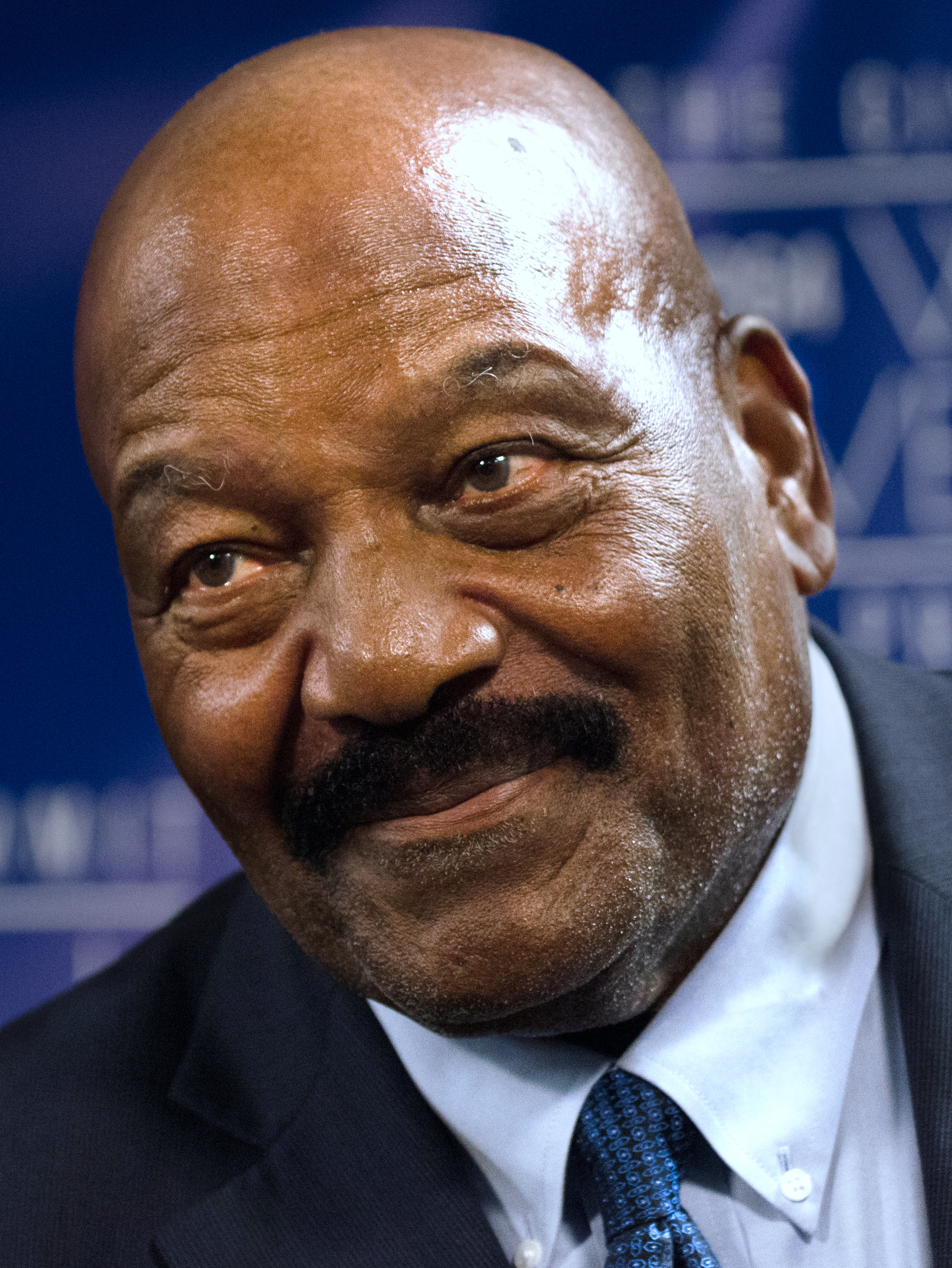
Jim Brown

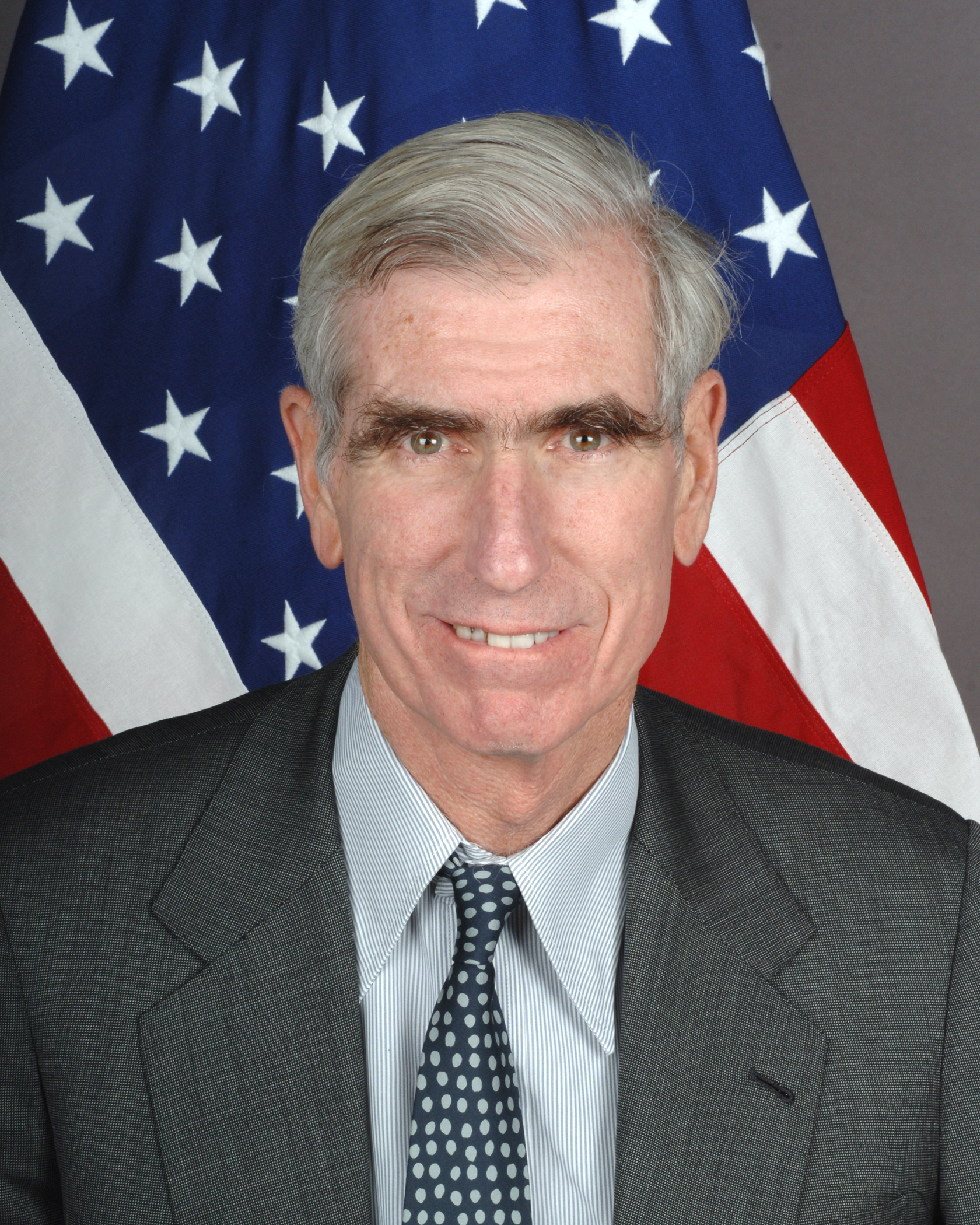
C. Boyden Gray

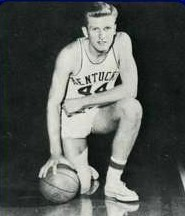
Cotton Nash

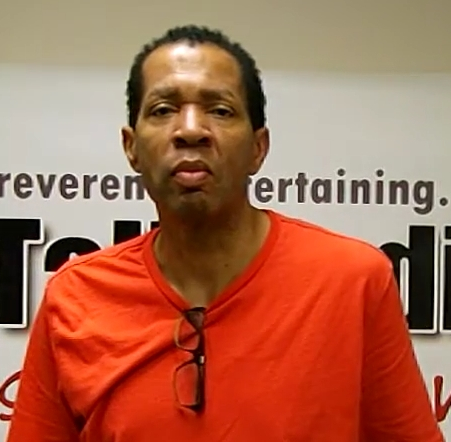
Sheldon Reynolds

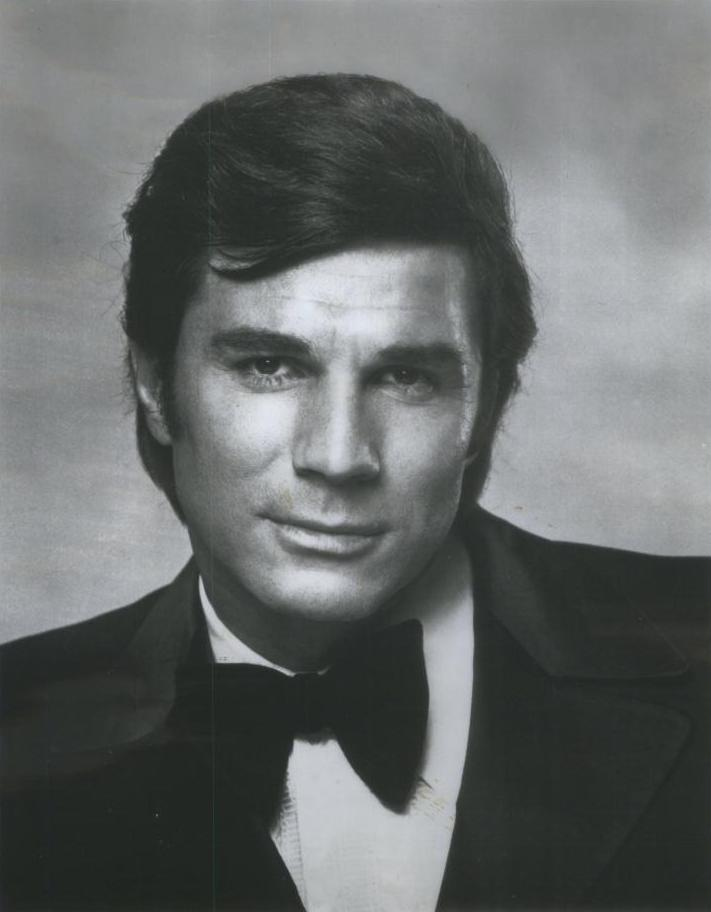
George Maharis

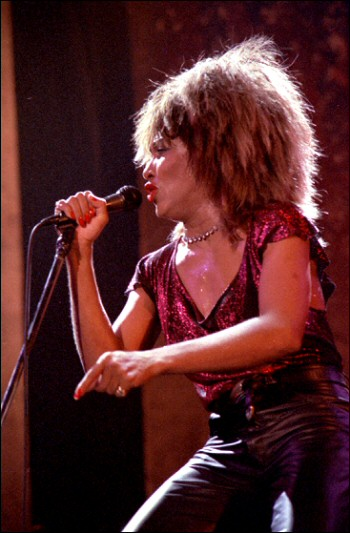
Tina Turner

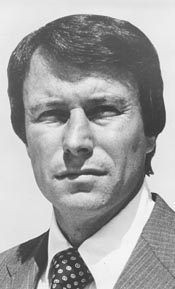
Don Bonker

- May 1
  - Dick Burwell, 83, baseball player (Chicago Cubs) (b. 1940)
  - Calvin Davis, 51, hurdler, Olympic bronze medalist (1996) (b. 1972)
  - Andrew Delaplaine, 73, novelist and screenwriter (Meeting Spencer) (b. 1949)
  - Paul Giambarba, 94, graphic designer and cartoonist (This Week) (b. 1928)
  - Jordan Neely, 30, Michael Jackson impersonator and vagrant (b. 1992–1993)
  - Eileen Saki, 79, Japanese-born actress (M*A*S*H, Splash, Policewomen) (b. 1943)
  - Marshall S. Smith, 85, educator (b. 1937)
- May 2
  - Barbara Bryne, 94, British-born actress (The Bostonians, Amadeus, Two Evil Eyes) (b. 1929)
  - Arun Manilal Gandhi, 89, South African-born Indian-American author and political activist (b. 1934)
- May 3
  - John Albert, 58, musician (Christian Death, Bad Religion) and music journalist (LA Weekly) (b. 1964)
  - Lance Blanks, 56, basketball player (Detroit Pistons, Minnesota Timberwolves) and general manager (Phoenix Suns) (b. 1966)
  - Dean Corren, 67, politician, member of the Vermont House of Representatives (1993–2001) (b. 1955)
  - Howard Krongard, 82, attorney, government official (inspector general of the Department of State, 2005–2008), and lacrosse Hall of Fame player (b. 1940)
  - Ronald Rene Lagueux, 91, jurist, judge of the U.S. District Court for Rhode Island (since 1986) (b. 1931)
  - Roland Pattillo, 89, gynecologic oncologist (b. 1933)
- May 4
  - Bill Basso, 60, special effects artist (Jurassic Park, Terminator 2: Judgment Day, Tremors) (b. 1962)
  - John C. Cushman III, 82, real estate executive (Cushman & Wakefield) (b. 1941)
  - Rob Laakso, 44, musician (Kurt Vile and the Violators, Swirlies), cholangiocarcinoma (b. 1979)
  - Terry Vaughn, 50, soccer referee (b. 1973)
- May 5
  - Gloria Belle, 83, bluegrass vocalist and musician (b. 1939)
  - Fortunato Benavides, 76, jurist, judge of the U.S. Court of Appeals for the Fifth Circuit (since 1994) (b. 1947)
  - Richard E. Carver, 85, politician, mayor of Peoria, Illinois (1973–1984) and assistant secretary of the Air Force for financial management (1984–1987) (b. 1937)
  - Samuel T. Durrance, 79, astronaut (STS-35, STS-67) (b. 1943)
  - Gary Finch, 79, politician, member of the New York State Assembly (1999–2021) (b. 1944)
  - Robert C. Shinn Jr., 85, politician, member of the New Jersey General Assembly (1985–1994) and commissioner of the NJDEP (1994–2002) (b. 1937)
  - Amy Silverstein, 59, medical memoirist (b. 1963)
  - Chris Strachwitz, 91, German-born record company founder and executive (Arhoolie Records) (b. 1931)
  - Beverly Torok-Storb, 75, physician (b. 1948)
  - Jack Wilkins, 78, jazz guitarist (b. 1944)
- May 6
  - Vida Blue, 73, baseball player (Oakland Athletics, San Francisco Giants, Kansas City Royals), three-time World Series champion (1972, 1973, 1974) (b. 1949)
  - Sam Gross, 89, cartoonist (The New Yorker) (b. 1933)
  - Tom Hornbein, 92, mountaineer (b. 1930)
  - Frank Kozik, 61, artist and graphic designer (b. 1961)
  - Newton N. Minow, 97, attorney, chairman of the Federal Communications Commission (1961–1963) (b. 1926)
  - Hanna Fenichel Pitkin, 91, German-born political theorist (b. 1931)
  - Menahem Pressler, 99, German-born Israeli-American pianist (Beaux Arts Trio) (b. 1923)
- May 7
  - Jerry Armstrong, 86, Olympic boxer (1960) (b. 1936)
  - Grace Bumbry, 86, operatic mezzo-soprano (b. 1937)
  - Larry Foster, 85, baseball player (Detroit Tigers) (b. 1937)
  - Don January, 93, golfer (PGA Tour, Senior PGA Tour), PGA Championship winner (1967) (b. 1929)
  - Deacon Jones, 89, baseball player (Chicago White Sox) and coach (Houston Astros, San Diego Padres) (b. 1934)
  - James Kerr, 82, Olympic fencer (1984) (b. 1940)
  - Larry Mahan, 79, rodeo cowboy, subject of The Great American Cowboy (b. 1943)
  - John Roland, 81, news presenter (WNEW-TV, NBC News) (b. 1941)
  - Fred Siegel, 78, historian and conservative writer (b. 1945)
  - Ronald Steel, 92, author and biographer (b. 1931)
- May 8
  - K. Patricia Cross, 97, education scholar (b. 1926)
  - Vern Holtgrave, 80, baseball player (Detroit Tigers) (b. 1942)
  - Joe Kapp, 85, Hall of Fame football player (BC Lions, Minnesota Vikings), coach (California Golden Bears) and executive (b. 1938)
- May 9
  - Heather Armstrong, 47, blogger (b. 1975)
  - Denny Crum, 86, Hall of Fame basketball coach (Louisville Cardinals) (b. 1937)
  - Edward Cullen, 90, Roman Catholic prelate, bishop of Allentown (1998–2009) and auxiliary bishop of Philadelphia (1994–1998) (b. 1933)
  - Moon Fun Chin, 110, Taiwanese-born supercentenarian, last surviving CNAC pilot (b. 1913)
  - Joaquin Romaguera, 90, tenor (The Most Important Man) and actor (b. 1932)
- May 10
  - Ed Flanagan, 79, football player (Detroit Lions, San Diego Chargers) (b. 1944)
  - Jack Rebney, 93, salesman, subject of Winnebago Man (b. 1929)
  - Jacklyn Zeman, 70, actress (General Hospital) (b. 1953)
- May 11
  - Kenneth Anger, 96, filmmaker (Fireworks, Lucifer Rising) and writer (Hollywood Babylon) (b. 1927)
  - Hodding Carter III, 88, journalist and spokesman, U.S. State Department Spokesperson (1977–1980) (b. 1935)
  - Stanley Engerman, 87, economist and historian (b. 1936)
  - Joe A. Garcia, 70, indigenous political activist and musician, president of the National Congress of American Indians (2006–2009) (b. 1952)
  - Barry Newman, 92, actor (Vanishing Point, Petrocelli, The Limey) (b. 1930)
- May 12
  - Don Denkinger, 86, baseball umpire (b. 1936)
  - Michael J. Juneau, 60, jurist, judge of the U.S. District Court for Western Louisiana (since 2018) (b. 1962)
  - Ralph Lee, 87, puppeteer and special effects artist (b. 1936)
  - Michael Norell, 85, actor (Emergency!) and television writer (The Love Boat, Nash Bridges) (b. 1937)
- May 13
  - Harry Bentley Bradley, 83, car and toy car designer (b. 1939)
  - Bill Kelly, 75, college football coach (West Texas A&M Buffaloes, Eastern New Mexico Greyhounds) (b. 1947)
  - Weldon Olson, 90, ice hockey player, Olympic champion (1960) (b. 1932)
  - Carl Yankowski, 74, businessman and CEO of Palm, Inc. and Ambient Devices (b. 1948)
- May 14
  - Billy Wayne Bailey, 65, politician, member of the West Virginia Senate (1991–2008) (b. 1957)
  - Doyle Brunson, 89, Hall of Fame poker player, WSOP champion (1976, 1977) (b. 1933)
  - Joe Gayton, 66, screenwriter (Hell on Wheels, Faster, Bulletproof) (b. 1956)
  - Christian Hansen Jr., 91, politician, member of the Vermont House of Representatives (1981–1982), U.S. Marshal for Vermont (1969–1977, 1982–1984) (b. 1931)
  - Gloria Molina, 74, politician, member of the California State Assembly (1982–1987) and the Los Angeles County Board of Supervisors (1991–2014) (b. 1948)
  - John Refoua, 58, film editor (Avatar, Olympus Has Fallen, Southpaw) (b. 1964)
  - Lamin Swann, 45, politician, member of the Kentucky House of Representatives (since 2023) (b. 1977)
- May 15
  - Sharon Farrell, 82, actress (The Reivers, It's Alive, Can't Buy Me Love) (b. 1940)
  - Belmar Gunderson, 88, tennis player (b. 1934)
  - Robert Lucas Jr., 85, economist (Lucas critique), Nobel Prize laureate (1995) (b. 1937)
- May 16
  - Rodrigo Barnes, 73, football player (Dallas Cowboys, New England Patriots, Oakland Raiders) (b. 1950)
  - Mark Gietzen, 69, anti-abortion and political activist (b. 1953)
  - Norm Green, 90, long-distance runner (b. 1932)
  - Marlene Hagge, 89, Hall of Fame golfer (b. 1934)
  - Richard Landis, 77, musician and music executive (b. 1946)
  - Pale Male, 32–33, red-tailed hawk (b. 1990)
  - Bill Perkins, 74, politician (b. 1949)
- May 17
  - Superstar Billy Graham, 79, professional wrestler (b. 1943)
  - Johnny Morgan, 76, politician, member of the Mississippi Senate (1983–1991) (b. 1947)
  - Eddie Southern, 85, hurdler, Olympic silver medalist (1956) (b. 1938)
  - Charles Stenholm, 84, politician, member of the U.S. House of Representatives (1979–2005) (b. 1938)
  - Marge Summit, 87, LGBT rights activist (b. 1935)
- May 18
  - Jim Brown, 87, Hall of Fame football player (Cleveland Browns) and actor (The Dirty Dozen, Mars Attacks!) (b. 1936)
  - Rashid Buttar, 57, physician and conspiracy theorist (b. 1966)
  - Marlene Clark, 73, actress (Sanford and Son, Slaughter, The Beast Must Die) and model (b. 1949)
  - Jimmy Dimos, 84, politician, member of the Louisiana House of Representatives (1976–1999) (b. 1938)
  - Buddy Melges, 93, sailor, Olympic champion (1972) (b. 1930)
  - Masatoshi Nei, 92, Japanese-born evolutionary biologist (b. 1931)
  - Dick Nourse, 83, television news anchor (KSL-TV) (b. 1940)
  - Sam Zell, 81, businessman (b. 1941)
- May 19
  - Marion Berry, 80, politician, member of the U.S. House of Representatives (1997–2011) (b. 1942)
  - Nicholas Gray, 86, restaurant owner (Gray's Papaya) (b. 1936)
  - Gordon Keddie, 78, Scottish-born pastor and theologian (b. 1944)
  - Tim Keller, 72, pastor (Redeemer Presbyterian Church) (b. 1950)
  - Ronald S. W. Lew, 81, jurist, judge of the U.S. District Court for Central California (since 1987) (b. 1941)
  - Kathy Mills Lynch, 54, makeup artist (Yellowstone, For All Mankind, The Card Counter) (b. 1968)
  - Craig Puki, 66, football player (San Francisco 49ers, St. Louis Cardinals) (b. 1957)
- May 20
  - Benjamin Harjo Jr., 77, painter (b. 1945)
  - Rick Hummel, 77, sports journalist (St. Louis Post-Dispatch) and author (b. 1946)
  - Leon Ichaso, 74, Cuban-born film director (El Super, Sugar Hill, El Cantante) (b. 1948)
  - Terry McDermott, 82, speed skater, Olympic champion (1964) (b. 1940)
  - Edmond J. Muniz, 83, politician, founder of Krewe of Endymion and mayor of Kenner, Louisiana (since 2006) (b. 1940)
  - Tom Sawyer, 77, politician, member of the U.S. House of Representatives (1987–2003) and Ohio Senate (2007–2016), mayor of Akron (1984–1986) (b. 1945)
  - Brian Shul, 75, Air Force major and aerial photographer (b. 1948)
- May 21
  - Ed Ames, 95, singer (Ames Brothers) and actor (Daniel Boone) (b. 1927)
  - David Brandt, 76, farmer (b. 1946)
  - C. Boyden Gray, 80, lawyer and diplomat, White House counsel (1989–1993) and ambassador to the European Union (2006–2007) (b. 1943)
  - David M. Jennings, 74, politician, member (1979–1987) and speaker (1985–1987) of the Minnesota House of Representatives (b. 1948)
  - Kathryn Jones Harrison, 99, tribal leader (b. 1924)
  - Lew Palter, 94, actor (First Monday in October, Titanic) (b. 1928)
  - Sam Slom, 81, politician, member of the Hawaii Senate (1997–2017) (b. 1942)
- May 22
  - Kirk Arrington, 61, drummer (Metal Church) (b. 1962)
  - Rick Hoyt, 61, marathon runner (Team Hoyt) (b. 1962)
  - Candace Introcaso, 69, academic administrator, president of La Roche University (since 2004) (b. 1953)
  - Peggy Lee Leather, 64, professional wrestler (WWF, NWA) (b. 1959)
  - James Lewis, 63, singer (Trans-Siberian Orchestra) (b. 1959)
- May 23
  - Mark Adams, 64, metal bassist (Saint Vitus) (b. 1958)
  - John Dunning, 81, author (b. 1942)
  - Fusaichi Pegasus, 26, Thoroughbred racehorse (b. 1997)
  - Redd Holt, 91, jazz drummer (The Ramsey Lewis Trio, Young-Holt Unlimited) (b. 1932)
  - Cotton Nash, 80, basketball (Los Angeles Lakers, Kentucky Colonels) and baseball player (Chicago White Sox) (b. 1942)
  - Floyd Newman, 91, saxophonist (b. 1931)
  - Sheldon Reynolds, 63, guitarist (Sun, Commodores, Earth, Wind & Fire) (b. 1959)
  - Robert Zimmer, 75, mathematician and academic administrator, president of the University of Chicago (2006–2021) (b. 1947)
- May 24
  - Emerson Allsworth, 96, lawyer and politician, member of the Florida House of Representatives (1959–1966) (b. 1936)
  - Jerry Krause, 87, Hall of Fame basketball coach (Gonzaga Bulldogs, Eastern Washington Eagles) (b. 1936)
  - Bill Lee, 94, jazz musician and film composer (She's Gotta Have It, School Daze, Do the Right Thing) (b. 1928)
  - George Maharis, 94, actor (Route 66, The Most Deadly Game, Fantasy Island) (b. 1928)
  - Dennis L. Riley, 77, politician, member of the New Jersey General Assembly (1980–1990) (b. 1945)
  - Tina Turner, 83, American-born Swiss singer ("River Deep – Mountain High", "A Fool in Love") and actress (Mad Max Beyond Thunderdome), eight-time Grammy winner (b. 1939)
- May 25
  - Glenn Farr, 77, film editor (The Right Stuff, Commando, The Serpent and the Rainbow), Oscar winner (1984) (b. 1946)
  - Frank Handlen, 106, painter and sculptor (b. 1916)
  - Gary Kent, 89, actor and stuntman (The Savage Seven, Psych-Out, Bubba Ho-Tep) (b. 1933)
  - Alice Palmer, 83, politician, member of the Illinois Senate (1991–1997) (b. 1939)
  - Denny Stolz, 89, football coach (Michigan State Spartans, Bowling Green Falcons, San Diego State Aztecs) (b. 1933)
- May 26
  - J. J. Bittenbinder, 80, police officer and television host (Tough Target) (b. 1942)
  - Kay B. Cobb, 81, jurist and politician, justice of the Supreme Court of Mississippi (1999–2007) and member of the Mississippi State Senate (1992–1996) (b. 1942)
  - Sammy Koskei, 37, Kenyan-born long-distance runner (b. 1986)
  - Reuben Wilson, 88, jazz organist (b. 1935)
- May 27
  - Anita Cornwell, 99, author and activist (b. 1923)
  - Ilya Kabakov, 89, Russian-born conceptual artist (b. 1933)
  - Claudia Rosett, 67, journalist (The Wall Street Journal) (b. 1955)
- May 28
  - Ernest Bertrand Boland, 97, Roman Catholic prelate, bishop of Multan (1966–1984) (b. 1925)
  - Alexander W. Dreyfoos Jr., 91, entrepreneur and philanthropist (b. 1932)
  - Owen Gingerich, 93, astronomer (b. 1930)
  - Milt Larsen, 92, actor and magician, creator of The Magic Castle (b. 1931)
- May 29
  - Thomas Buergenthal, 89, Czechoslovak-born international lawyer, law school dean, and judge of the International Court of Justice (2000–2010) (b. 1934)
  - Victor Galeone, 87, Roman Catholic prelate, bishop of St. Augustine (2001–2011) (b. 1935)
  - William O'Neil, 90, businessman, stockbroker and writer (b. 1933)
  - Robin Wagner, 89, set designer (The Producers, Jesus Christ Superstar, City of Angels), Tony winner (1978, 1990, 2001) (b. 1933)
  - Mike Young, 63, baseball player (Baltimore Orioles) (b. 1960)
- May 30
  - John Beasley, 79, actor (Rudy, Walking Tall, The Purge: Anarchy) (b. 1943)
  - Don Bonker, 86, politician, member of the U.S. House of Representatives (1975–1989) (b. 1937)
  - Jessie Maple, 76, cinematographer and film director (Will, Twice as Nice) (b. 1947)
  - Bill McGovern, 60, football coach (UCLA Bruins) (b. 1962)
  - Harvey Pitt, 78, lawyer, chairman of the Securities and Exchange Commission (2001–2003) (b. 1945)
- May 31
  - Sergio Calderón, 77, Mexican-born actor (Pirates of the Caribbean: At World's End, Men in Black, The Ruins) (b. 1945)
  - Amitai Etzioni, 94, Israeli-born sociologist (b. 1929)
  - Dickie Harrell, 82, Hall of Fame drummer (Gene Vincent and the Blue Caps) (b. 1940) (death announced on this date)
  - Gene Rogers, 93, politician, member of the North Carolina House of Representatives (1987–2003) (b. 1929)

== June ==
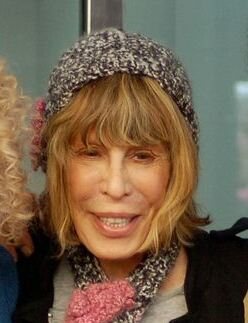
Cynthia Weil

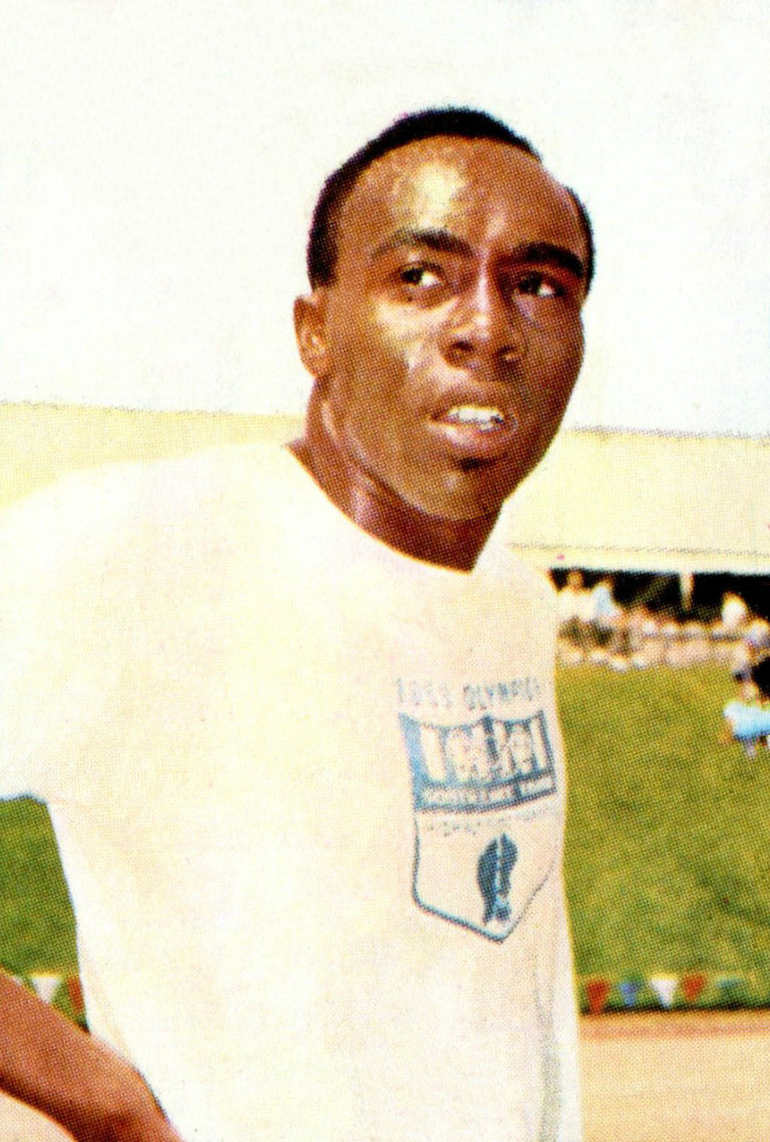
Jim Hines

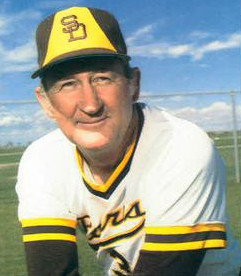
Roger Craig

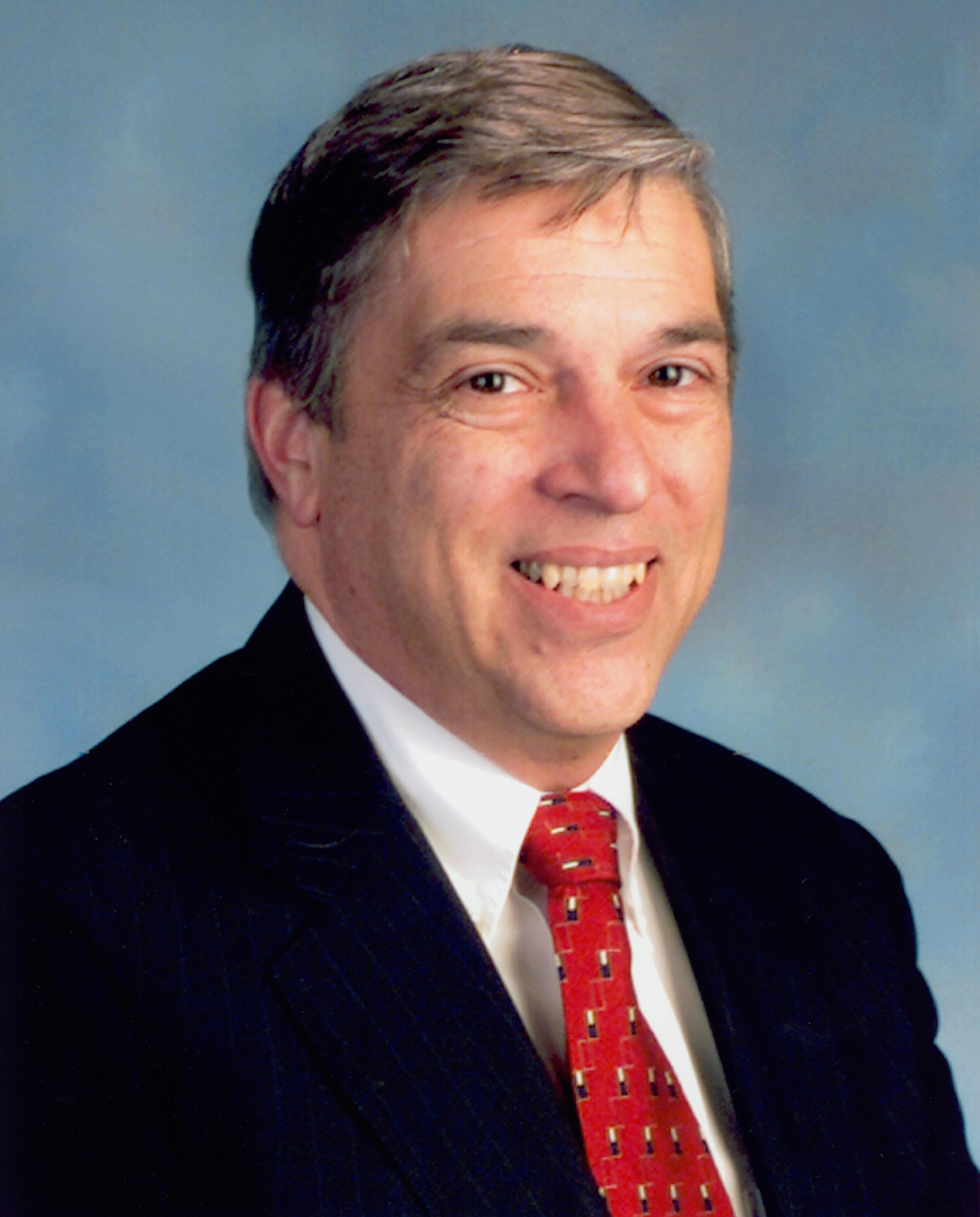
Robert Hanssen

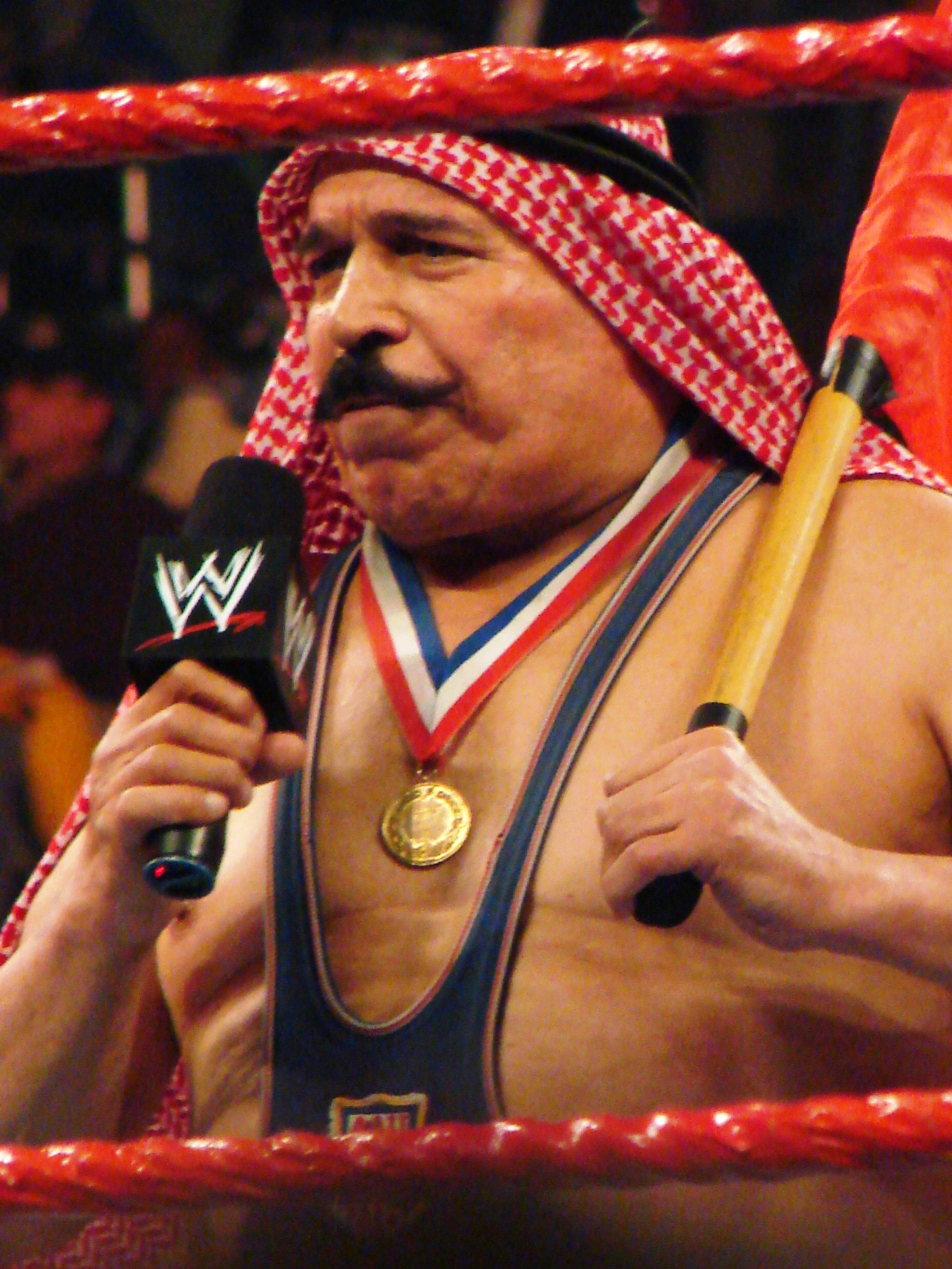
The Iron Sheik

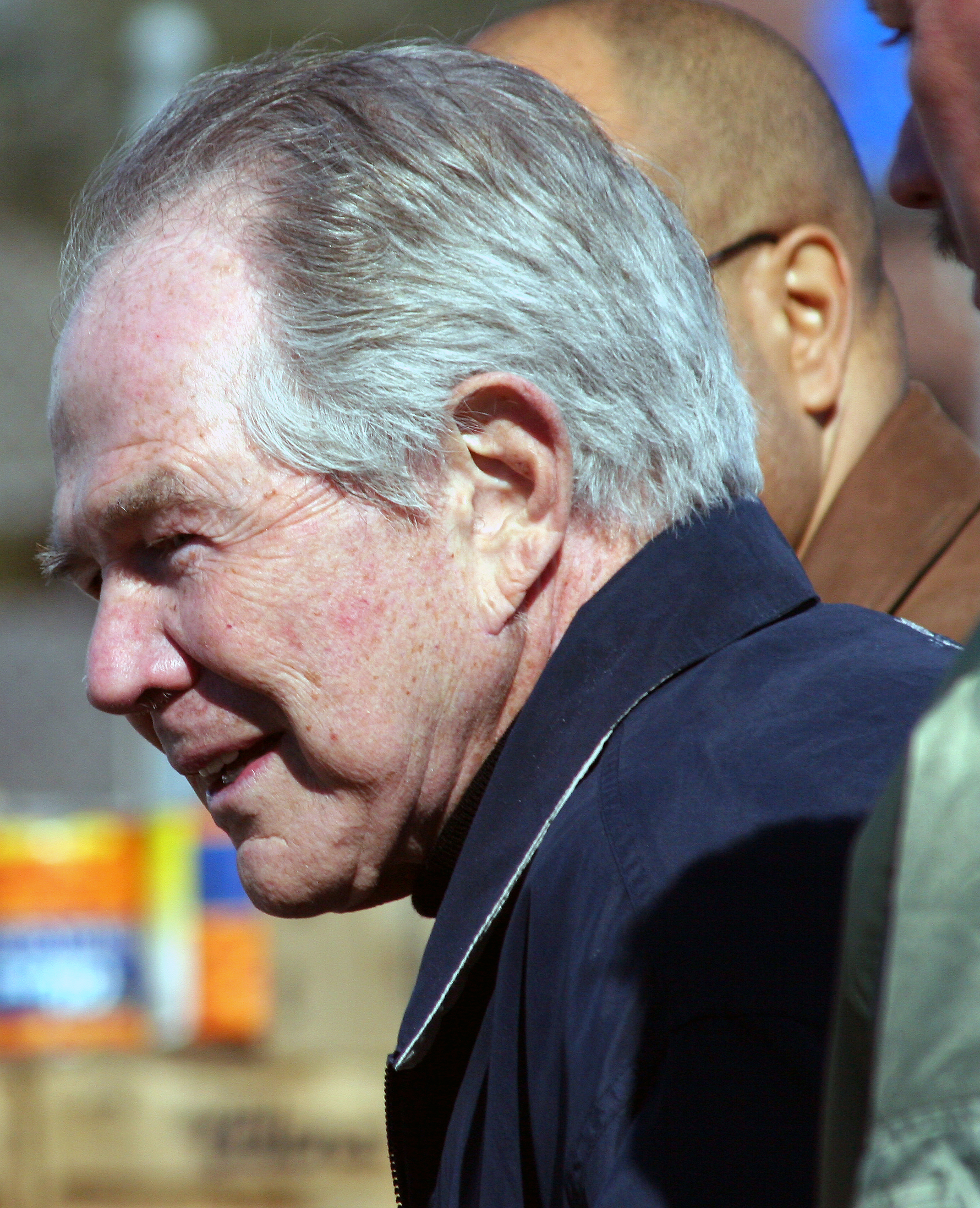
Pat Robertson

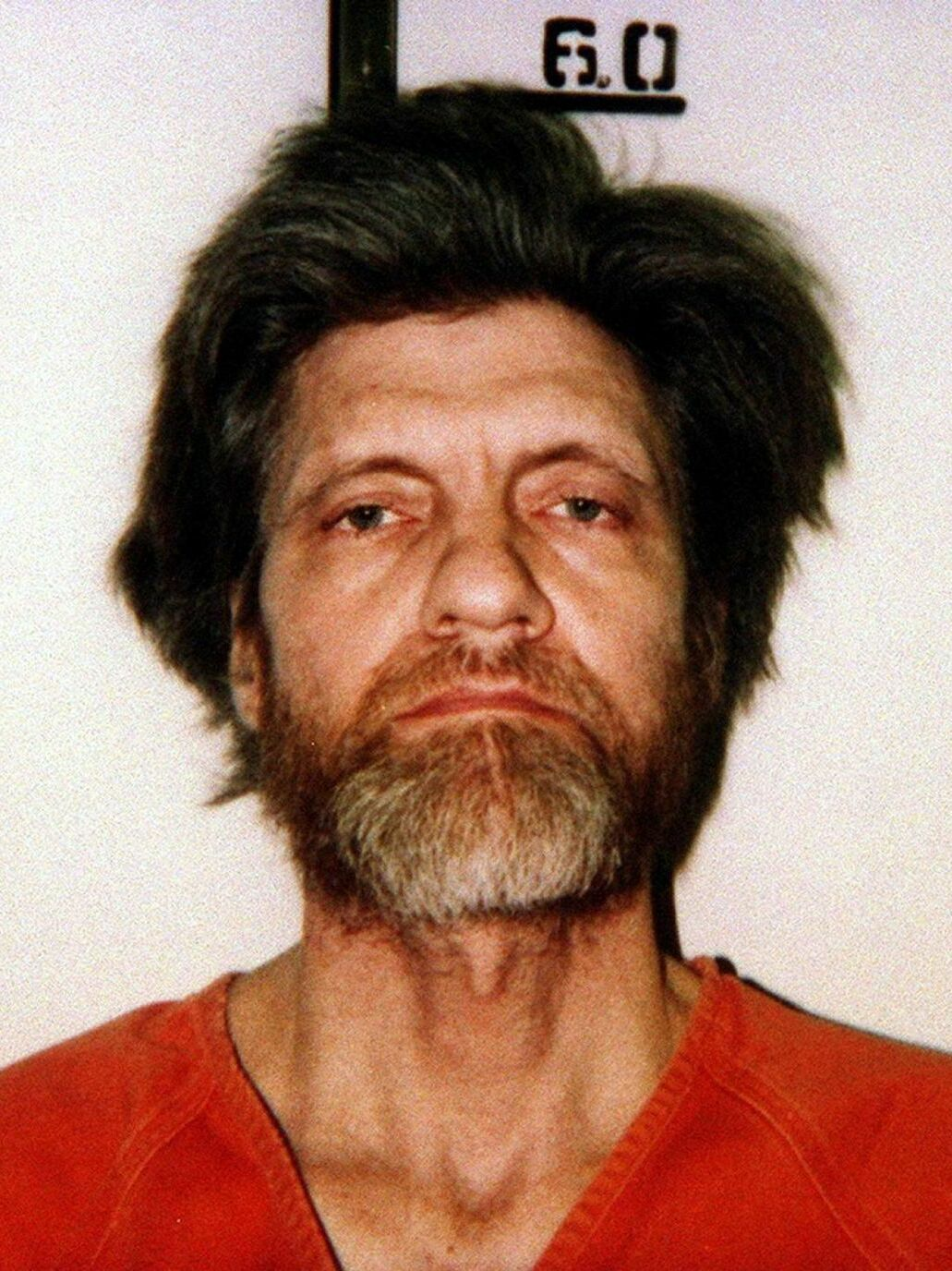
Ted Kaczynski

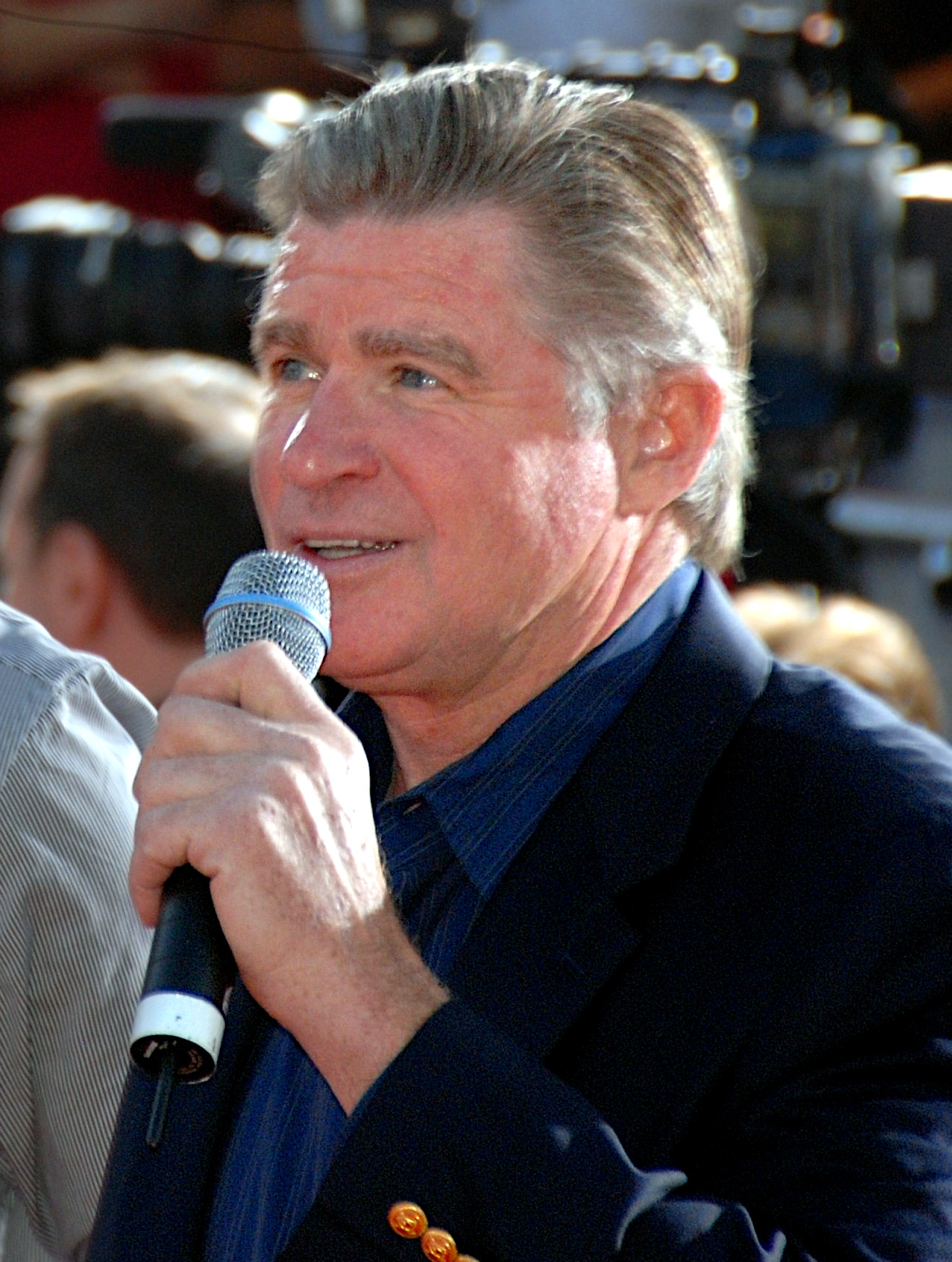
Treat Williams

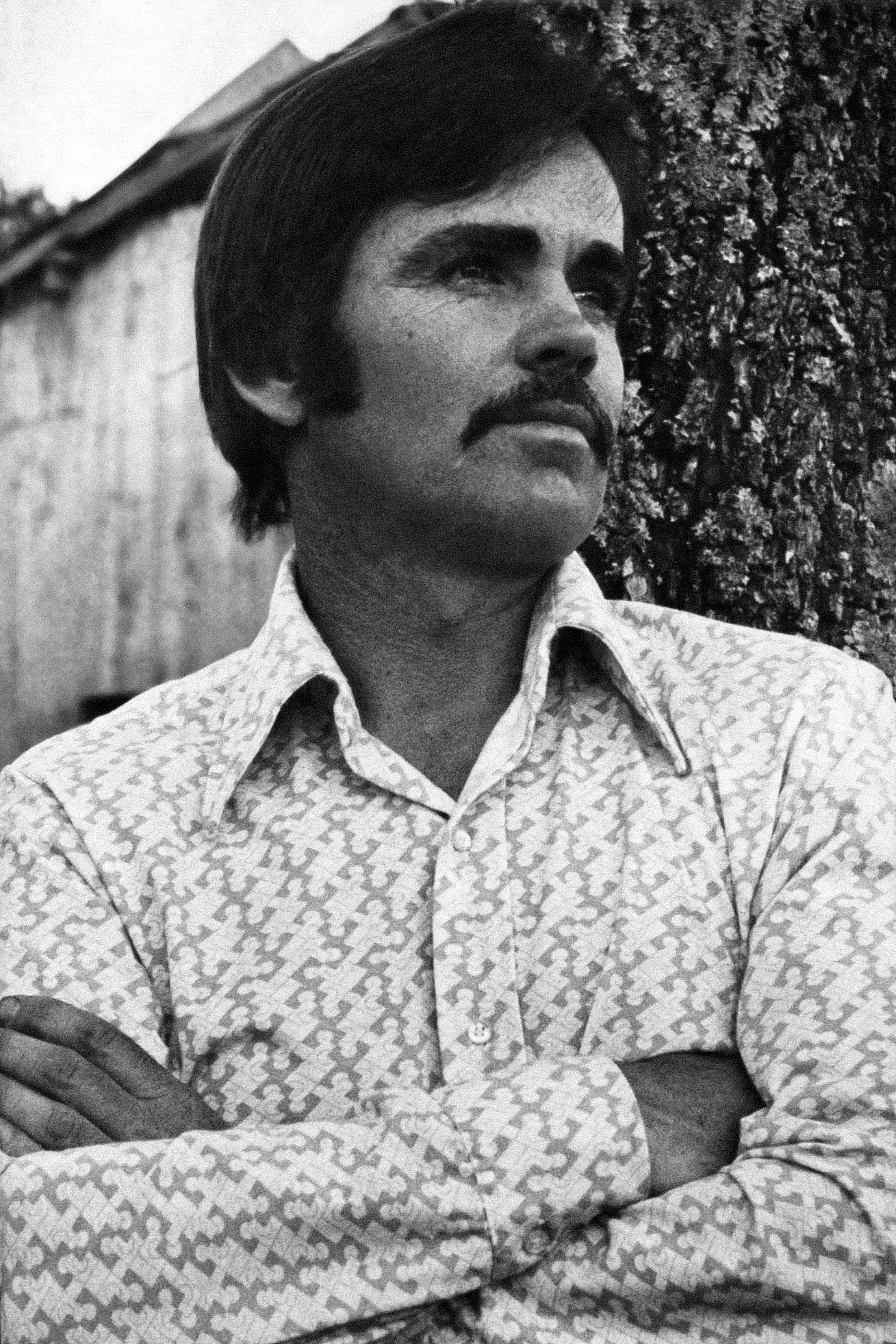
Cormac McCarthy

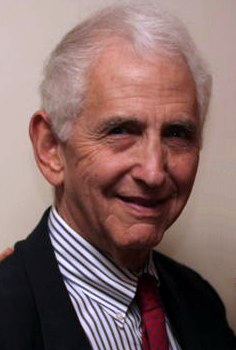
Daniel Ellsberg

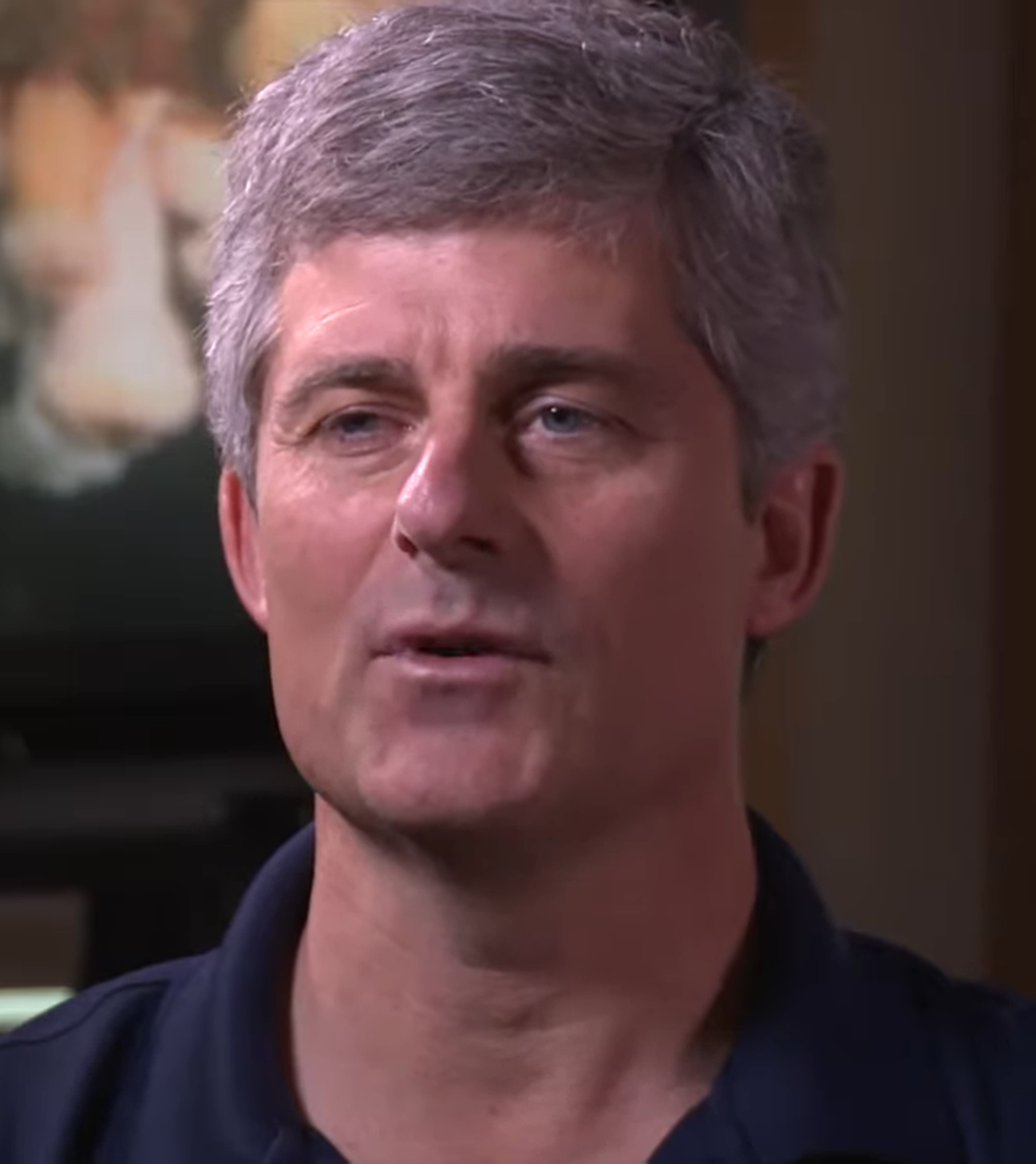
Stockton Rush

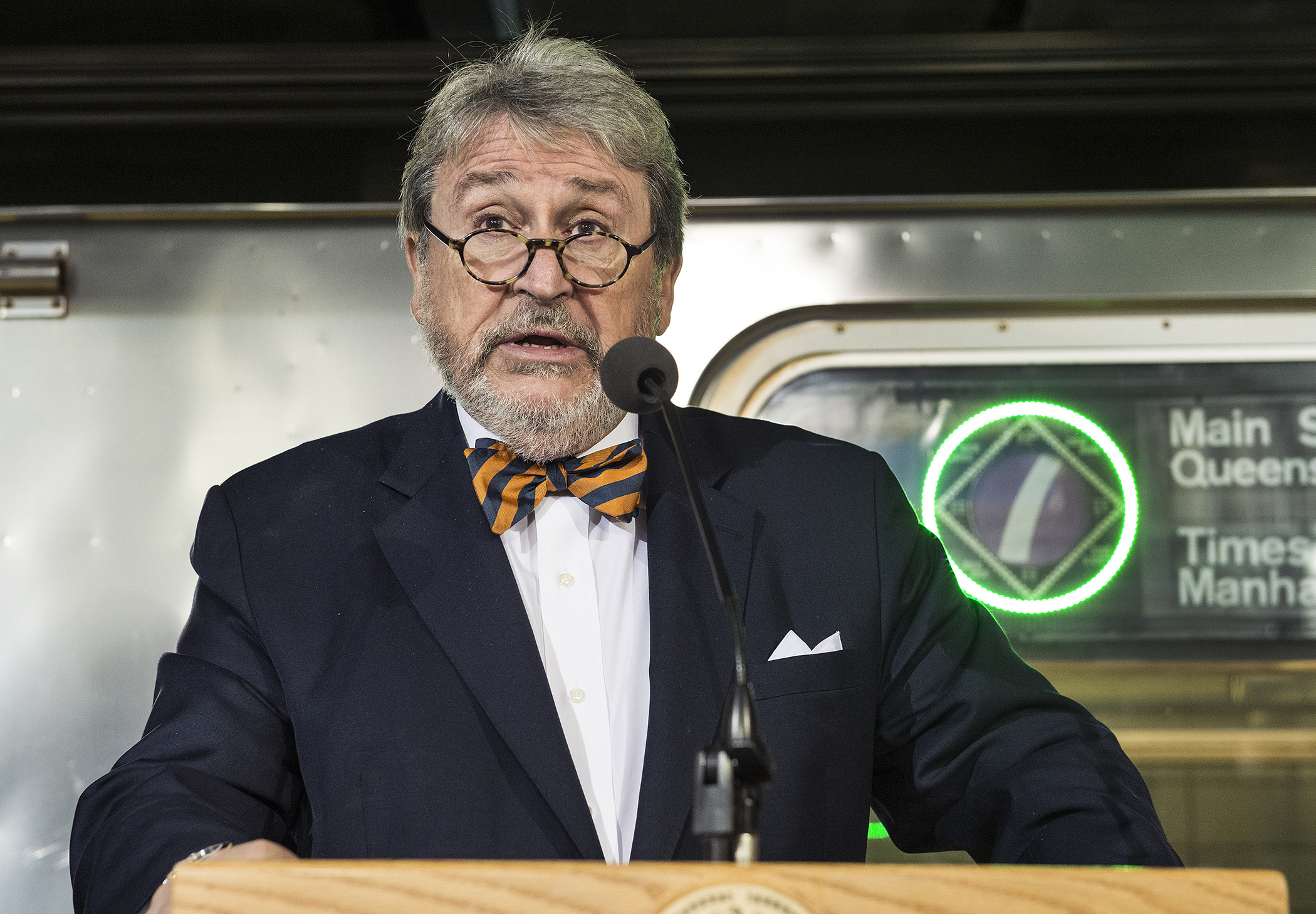
Michael Horodniceanu

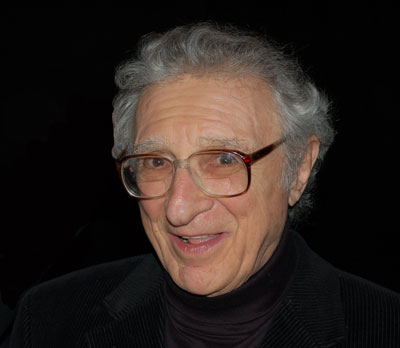
Sheldon Harnick

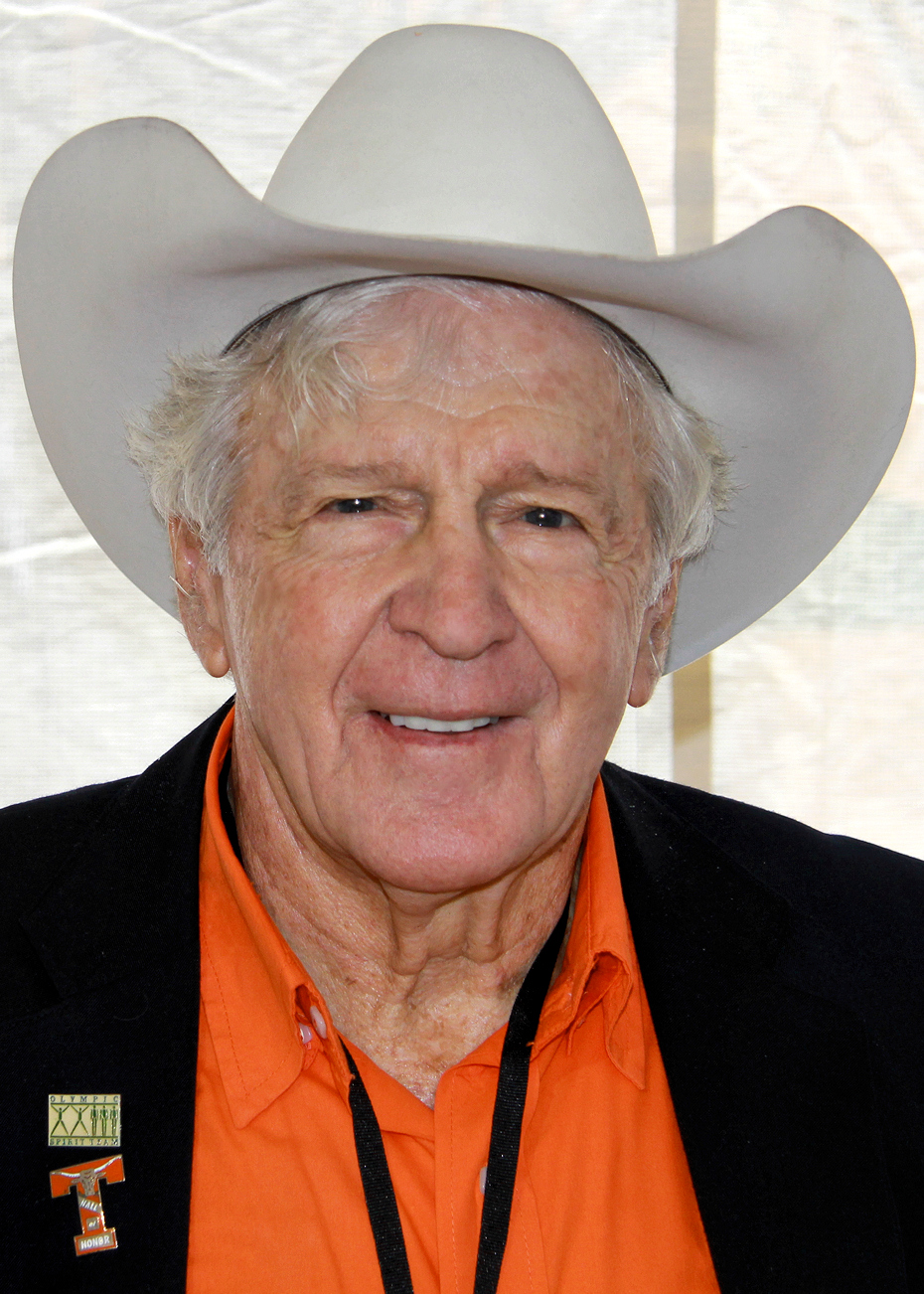
Dean Smith

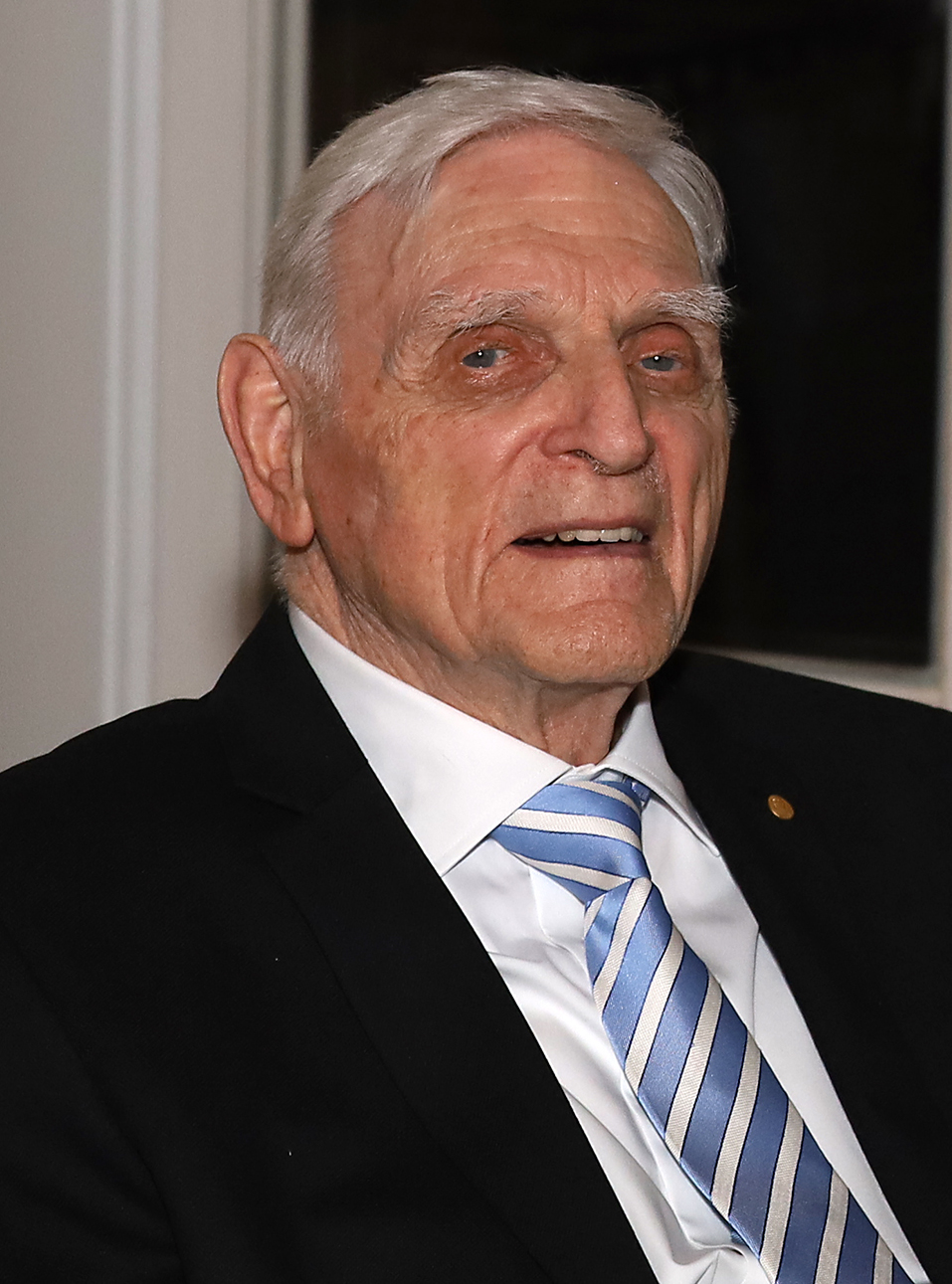
John B. Goodenough

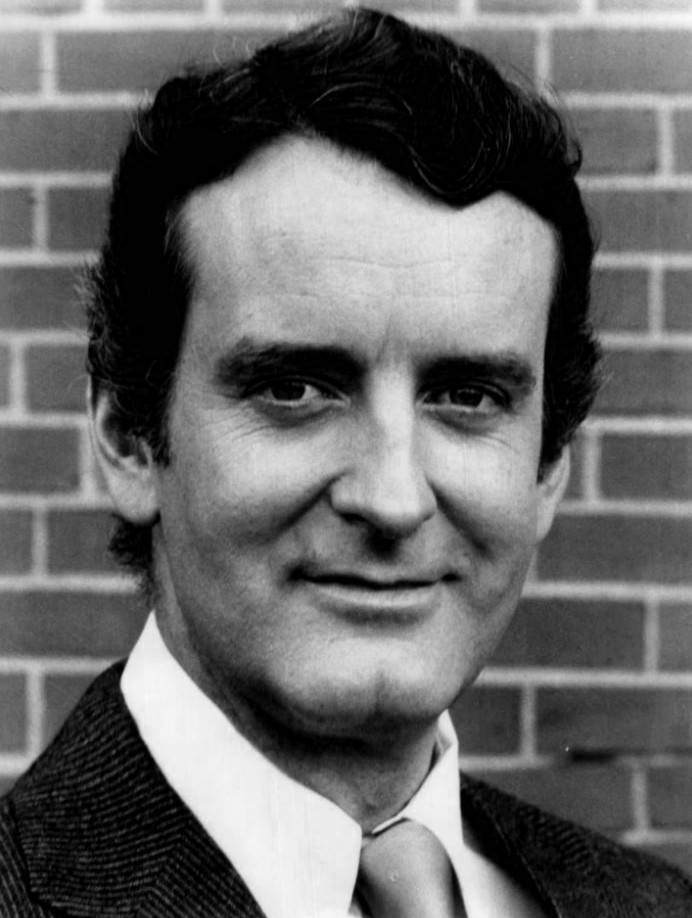
Nicolas Coster

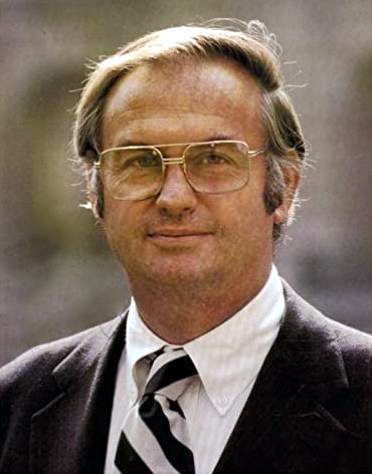
Lowell Weicker

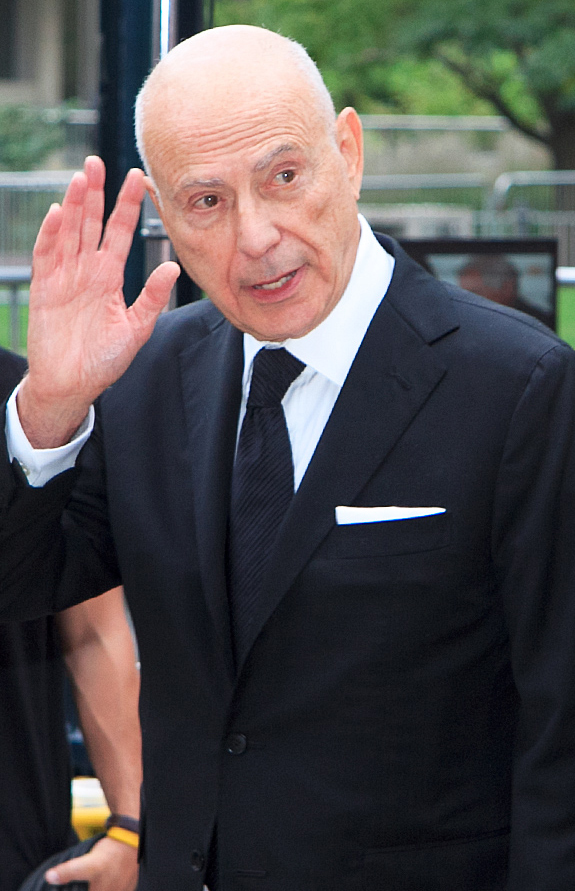
Alan Arkin

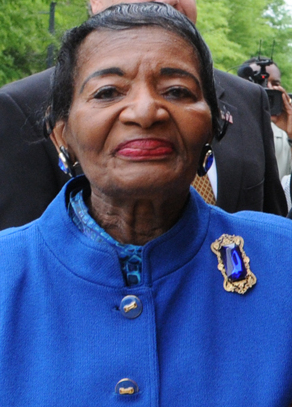
Christine King Farris

- June 1
  - Billy Ray Adams, 84, football player (Ole Miss Rebels) (b. 1938)
  - Ronald L. Baker, 85, folklorist (b. 1937)
  - Michael Batayeh, 52, comedian and actor (Breaking Bad, American Dreamz, AmericanEast) (b. 1970)
  - Jim Melchert, 92, artist (b, 1930)
  - Anna Shay, 62, socialite, businesswoman and television personality (Bling Empire) (b. 1960)
  - John Sullivan, 82, baseball player (Detroit Tigers, New York Mets) and coach (Toronto Blue Jays) (b. 1941)
  - Cynthia Weil, 82, songwriter ("On Broadway", "Make Your Own Kind of Music") (b. 1940)
- June 2
  - Bob Bolin, 84, baseball player (San Francisco Giants, Boston Red Sox, Milwaukee Brewers) (b. 1939)
  - Bob Menne, 81, golfer (b. 1942)
  - George Riddle, 86, actor (Simon, Arthur, Little Manhattan) (b. 1937)
  - Beverly Shade, 87, professional wrestler (b. 1936)
- June 3
  - Byron Barton, 92, writer and illustrator (b. 1930)
  - Paul Geoffrey, 68, English-born actor (Excalibur, Greystoke: The Legend of Tarzan, Lord of the Apes, The Manageress) (b. 1955)
  - Jim Hines, 76, sprinter, Olympic champion (1968), and football player (Miami Dolphins, Kansas City Chiefs) (b. 1946)
  - Michael Sheehan, 83, Roman Catholic prelate, bishop of Lubbock (1983–1993) and archbishop of Santa Fe (1993–2015) (b. 1939)
- June 4
  - Bill Beck, 61, politician, member of the Tennessee House of Representatives (since 2014) (b. 1962)
  - Roger Craig, 93, baseball player (Brooklyn / Los Angeles Dodgers, New York Mets) and manager (San Francisco Giants) (b. 1930)
  - Norma Hunt, 85, owner of the Kansas City Chiefs (since 2006) (b. 1938)
  - Scott Schinder, 61, music critic and journalist (Rolling Stone, Entertainment Weekly, Trouser Press) (b. 1962)
  - George Winston, 73, pianist (December, Summer, Forest), Grammy winner (1996) (b. 1949)
- June 5
  - Robert Hanssen, 79, former FBI agent and convicted spy (b. 1944)
  - Ron Miller, 78, fencing coach (b. 1944)
- June 6
  - Jack Baldschun, 86, baseball player (Philadelphia Phillies, Cincinnati Reds, San Diego Padres) (b. 1936)
  - Linda Burdette, 74, gymnastics coach (West Virginia University) (b. 1948/49)
  - Thomas G. Carruthers, 94, politician, member of the Connecticut State Senate (1973–1975) (b. 1929)
  - Pat Casey, 29, BMX rider (b. 1993)
  - Pat Cooper, 93, actor (Fighting Back, Analyze This, Analyze That) and comedian (b. 1929)
  - Paul Eckstein, 59, actor and television writer and producer (Godfather of Harlem, Narcos, Law & Order: Criminal Intent) (b. 1963)
  - William Howarth, 82, writer and professor (b. 1940)
  - John McCoy, 79, politician, member of the Washington House of Representatives (2003–2013) and Senate (2013–2020) (b. 1943)
  - Noreen Nash, 99, actress (The Big Fix, Phantom from Space, Giant) (b. 1924)
  - Richard E. Snyder, 90, publishing executive (Simon & Schuster, Western Publishing) (b. 1933)
  - William Spriggs, 68, economist (b. 1955)
- June 7
  - Saskia Hamilton, 56, poet (b. 1967)
  - Tom Jolls, 89, television personality (WKBW-TV) (b. 1933)
  - Sir Ivan Menezes, 63, Indian-born beverage industry executive, CEO of Diageo (since 2013) (b. 1959)
  - Lia Mortensen, 57, actress (A Nightmare on Elm Street) (b. 1964)
  - Lisl Steiner, 95, Austrian-born photographer, photojournalist and documentary filmmaker (b. 1927)
  - The Iron Sheik, 81, Iranian-born Hall of Fame professional wrestler (AWA, WWF) (b. 1942)
  - Eve Tetaz, 91, activist (b. 1931)
- June 8
  - Robert Holmes Bell, 79, jurist, judge (since 1987) and chief judge (2001–2008) of the U.S. District Court for Western Michigan (b. 1944)
  - Julie Garwood, 78, author (Ransom) (b. 1944)
  - Wade Goodwyn, 63, news journalist (NPR) (b. 1959)
  - Zina Jasper, 84, actress (Crimes and Misdemeanors) (b. 1939)
  - Ian McGinty, 38, comic book writer and artist (Bravest Warriors, Bee and PuppyCat) (b. 1985)
  - Pat Robertson, 93, media mogul, religious broadcaster, chairman of the Christian Broadcasting Network and presidential candidate (1988) (b. 1930)
- June 9
  - Laurent Belanger, 92, politician, member of the Florida House of Representatives (1974–1976) (b. 1931)
  - Otis Grand, 73, Lebanese-born blues musician (b. 1950)
  - Firouz Naderi, 77, Iranian-born scientist (b. 1946)
  - Ron Richard, 75, politician, member (2003–2011) and speaker (2009–2011) of the Missouri House of Representatives and member of the Missouri Senate (2011–2019) (b. 1947)
  - Alton Waldon, 86, politician, member of the New York State Assembly (1983–1987), State Senate (1991–1999), and U.S. House of Representatives (1986–1987) (b. 1936)
  - John F. Wood Jr., 87, politician, member of the Maryland House of Delegates (1987–2015) (b. 1936)
- June 10
  - Kyle Brown, 42, baseball player (Ohio State Buckeyes) and network director (ESPN) (b. 1981)
  - Ken Hansen, 71, politician, member of the Montana Senate (2002–2010).
  - Don Hood, 73, baseball player (Baltimore Orioles, Cleveland Indians, Kansas City Royals) (b. 1949)
  - Ted Kaczynski, 81, mathematician and domestic terrorist (Unabomber Manifesto) (b. 1942)
  - Virgil Luken, 80, Olympic swimmer (1964) (b. 1942)
  - Roger Payne, 88, biologist and environmentalist (b. 1935)
  - Jim Turner, 82, football player (New York Jets, Denver Broncos) (b. 1941)
- June 11
  - Franz S. Leichter, 92, Austrian-born politician, member of the New York State Assembly (1969–1974) and Senate (1975–1998) (b. 1930)
  - Danny Young, 51, baseball player (Chicago Cubs) (b. 1971)
- June 12
  - Cyril Birch, 98, British-born sinologist and translator (b. 1925)
  - Michael Catt, 70, pastor (Sherwood Baptist Church) and film producer (Fireproof, Courageous) (b. 1952)
  - Carol Higgins Clark, 66, mystery author and actress (b. 1956)
  - Patrick Gasienica, 24, Olympic ski jumper (2022) (b. 1998)
  - Harvey Glance, 66, sprinter, Olympic champion (1976) (b. 1957)
  - Reggie Moore, 42, American-born Angolan basketball player (Maccabi Givat Shmuel, UB La Palma, Primeiro de Agosto) (b. 1981)
  - John Romita Sr., 93, comic book artist (The Amazing Spider-Man) (b. 1930)
  - Richard Severo, 90, science journalist (The New York Times) (b. 1932)
  - Stan Savran, 76, sports media personality (b. 1947)
  - Treat Williams, 71, actor (Hair, Everwood, Once Upon a Time in America, Chicago Fire) (b. 1951)
- June 13
  - David M. Bartley, 88, politician, member (1963–1976) and speaker (1969–1975) of the Massachusetts House of Representatives (b. 1935)
  - Edward Fredkin, 88, physicist, computer scientist and businessman (b. 1934)
  - Lonnie Hammargren, 85, neurosurgeon and politician, lieutenant governor of Nevada (1995–1999) (b. 1937)
  - April Kingsley, 82, art critic (b. 1941)
  - Eina Kwon, 34, restaurant owner, shot (b. 1989)
  - Cormac McCarthy, 89, novelist (Blood Meridian, No Country for Old Men, The Road) (b. 1933)
  - Curtis L. Meinert, 88, epidemiologist (b. 1934)
  - Larry Myers Jr., 49, reality television personality (My 600-lb Life) (b. 1974)
  - Blackie Onassis, 57, rock drummer (Urge Overkill) (b. 1966)
  - Hiroe Tsukamoto, anime producer. (death announced on this date)
- June 14
  - Charles L. Blockson, 89, historian, author, and bibliophile (b. 1933)
  - Robert Gottlieb, 92, writer and editor (The New Yorker) (b. 1931)
  - Brett Hadley, 92, actor (The Young and the Restless) (b. 1931)
  - Roman Jackiw, 83, Polish-born theoretical physicist, Dirac Medalist (1998) (b. 1939)
  - Homer Jones, 82, football player (New York Giants, Cleveland Browns) (b. 1941)
  - Charles C. Lovell, 93, jurist, judge of the U.S. District Court for Montana (since 1985) (b. 1929)
  - Warren McGraw, 84, lawyer, politician, and judge (b. 1939)
  - Henry Petroski, 81, engineer and professor (b. 1942)
- June 15
  - David P. Calleo, 88, political scientist (b. 1934)
  - Dan Lardner, singer and guitarist (QTY). (death announced on this date)
  - Donald Triplett, 89, medical figure, first person diagnosed with autism (b. 1933)
- June 16
  - Bob Brown, 81, Hall of Fame football player (Philadelphia Eagles, Los Angeles Rams, Oakland Raiders) (b. 1941)
  - Daniel Ellsberg, 92, whistleblower of the Pentagon Papers (b. 1931)
  - Rita Reif, 94, newspaper columnist and author (b. 1929)
  - Bruce Roberts, 93, photographer and author (b. 1930)
  - Norman R. Stone Jr., 87, politician, member of the Maryland House of Delegates (1963–1967) and Senate (1967–2015) (b. 1935)
  - Jim Tweto, 68, bush pilot (Flying Wild Alaska) (b. 1955)
  - Dave Viti, 83, football player (Hamilton Tiger-Cats) (b. 1939) (death announced on this date)
- June 17
  - James R. Hurley, 91, politician, member of the New Jersey General Assembly (1968–1982) and New Jersey Senate (1982–1990) (b. 1932)
  - Gus Newport, 88, politician, mayor of Berkeley, California (1979–1986) (b. 1935)
- June 18
  - Big Pokey, 48, rapper (Screwed Up Click, "Sittin' Sidewayz") (b. 1974)
  - Jim Brandenburg, 87, college basketball coach (Wyoming Cowboys, San Diego State Aztecs) (b. 1935)
  - Dick Hall, 92, baseball player (Pittsburgh Pirates, Baltimore Orioles, Philadelphia Phillies) (b. 1930)
  - Stockton Rush, 60, co-founder and chief executive officer of OceanGate (Titan submersible implosion) (b. 1962)
  - Charley Scales, 85, football player (Cleveland Browns, Pittsburgh Steelers, Montreal Alouettes) (b. 1938)
  - Teresa Taylor, 60, drummer (Butthole Surfers) and actress (Slacker) (b. 1962)
- June 19
  - Michael A. Banks, 72, writer (b. 1951)
  - George Frazier, 68, baseball player (St. Louis Cardinals, New York Yankees, Minnesota Twins) (b. 1954)
  - Clark Haggans, 46, football player (Pittsburgh Steelers, Arizona Cardinals, San Francisco 49ers) (b. 1977)
  - Gerald C. Meyers, 94, businessman, CEO of American Motors Corporation (1977–1982) (b. 1928)
  - Max Morath, 96, ragtime pianist, television presenter and author (b. 1926)
- June 20
  - Robert Elegant, 95, author and journalist (b. 1928)
  - Brison Manor, 70, football player (Denver Broncos, Tampa Bay Buccaneers) (b. 1952)
  - H. Lee Sarokin, 94, jurist, judge of the U.S. District Court of New Jersey (1979–1994) and Court of Appeals for the Third Circuit (1994–1996) (b. 1928)
- June 21
  - Russell H. Dilday, 92, pastor, president of the Southwestern Baptist Theological Seminary (1978–1994) (b. 1930)
  - Daniel Fuller, 97, theologian and academic (b. 1925)
  - Cedric Killings, 45, football player (Houston Texas) (b. 1977)
  - George Winterling, 91, television meteorologist (WJXT) (b. 1931)
  - Robin F. Wynne, 70, jurist, associate justice of the Arkansas Supreme Court (since 2014) (b. 1953)
- June 22
  - Robert Black, 67, double bass player (Bang on a Can All Stars) (b. 1956)
  - Cora Cohen, 79, artist (b. 1943)
  - Michael Horodniceanu, 78, Romanian-born engineer (b. 1944)
  - Harry Markowitz, 95, economist (modern portfolio theory), Nobel Prize laureate (1990) (b. 1927)
- June 23
  - Margia Dean, 101, actress (I Shot Jesse James, The Baron of Arizona, The Quatermass Xperiment) (b. 1922)
  - Penny Ann Early, 80, jockey and basketball player (Kentucky Colonels) (b. 1943)
  - Frederic Forrest, 86, actor (The Rose, The Conversation, Apocalypse Now) (b. 1936)
  - Sheldon Harnick, 99, lyricist (Fiorello!, Fiddler on the Roof, She Loves Me) and Tony winner (1960, 1965) (b. 1924)
  - Jimmy Kim, 56, taekwondo practitioner, Olympic champion (1988) (b. 1967)
  - Omer Léger, 92, American-born Canadian politician, New Brunswick MLA (1971–1987) (b. 1931)
  - Jesse McReynolds, 93, bluegrass musician (Jim & Jesse) (b. 1929)
  - Lee Rauch, 58, drummer (Megadeth, Dark Angel) (b. 1956)
  - Amy Uyematsu, 75, poet (b. 1947)
- June 24
  - Saundra Graham, 81, politician, member of the Massachusetts House of Representatives (1977–1988) (b. 1942)
  - Dodie Heath, 96, actress (Brigadoon, The Diary of Anne Frank, Seconds) (b. 1926)
  - Lena Kourkoutis, 44, physicist (b. 1978)
  - Robert "Say" McIntosh, 79, political activist (b. 1944) (death announced on this date)
  - David Richards, 82, theater critic and novelist (b. 1941)
  - Dean Smith, 91, track and field athlete, Olympic champion (1952), stuntman and actor (Rhinestone, Raw Deal, Creepshow 2) (b. 1931)
- June 25
  - David Bohrman, 69, television news executive (ABC News, CNN, Current TV) (b. 1954)
  - James Crown, 70, businessman (b. 1953)
  - John B. Goodenough, 100, materials scientist, Nobel Prize laureate (2019) (b. 1922)
  - Mike Kellogg, 81, radio broadcaster (Moody Radio) and writer (b. 1941)
  - Richard Ravitch, 89, businessman and politician, lieutenant governor of New York (2009–2010) (b. 1933)
  - Peg Yorkin, 96, philanthropist (b. 1927)
- June 26
  - Richard B. Bernstein, 67, constitutional historian (b. 1956)
  - Dick Biondi, 90, disc jockey (b. 1932)
  - Tony Bouza, 94, Spanish-born police chief (b. 1928)
  - Nicolas Coster, 89, British-born actor (Santa Barbara, Another World, All the President's Men) (b. 1933)
  - Carroll Leavell, 86, politician, member of the New Mexico Senate (1997–2018) (b. 1936) (death announced on this date)
  - David Neubert, 69, double bassist and academic (b. 1953)
  - Scott Pelluer, 64, football player (New Orleans Saints) and coach (Boise State Broncos, Washington Huskies) (b. 1959)
  - Mike Spivey, 69, football player (Chicago Bears, New Orleans Saints, Oakland Raiders) (b. 1954)
- June 27
  - Dewey L. Hill, 97, politician, member of the North Carolina House of Representatives (1992–2012) (b. 1925)
  - Ryan Mallett, 35, football player (New England Patriots, Houston Texans, Baltimore Ravens) (b. 1988)
  - Bobby Osborne, 91, bluegrass musician (Osborne Brothers) (b. 1931)
  - Robert Sherman, 90, radio broadcaster (WFUV, WQXR), author, and music critic (The New York Times) (b. 1930)
  - Lilli Vincenz, 85, German-born gay rights activist (b. 1937)
- June 28
  - Bob Shannon, 74, radio disc jockey (WCBS-FM) (b. 1948)
  - Lowell Weicker, 92, politician, member of the U.S. House of Representatives (1969–1971) and Senate (1971–1989), governor of Connecticut (1991–1995) (b. 1931)
- June 29
  - Alan Arkin, 89, actor (The Russians Are Coming, the Russians Are Coming, Edward Scissorhands, Little Miss Sunshine), Oscar winner (2006) (b. 1934)
  - Monte Cazazza, 68, industrial musician (b. 1954)
  - Don Kennedy, 93, radio broadcaster (WPIC, NBC Radio, WWPW), television personality (WSB-TV), and voice actor (Space Ghost Coast to Coast) (b. 1930)
  - Christine King Farris, 95, civil rights activist (b. 1927)
  - Marvin Kitman, 93, television critic (Newsday) and humorist (b. 1929)
  - Anita Wood, 85, recording artist, TV performer and girlfriend of Elvis Presley (b. 1938)
- June 30
  - Droz, 54, professional wrestler (WWF) and football player (Denver Broncos, Montreal Alouettes) (b. 1969)
  - Rick Froberg, 55, musician (Drive Like Jehu, Hot Snakes, Obits) (b. 1968)
  - Lawrence W. Jones, 97, physicist and academic (b. 1925)
  - Laird Koenig, 95, author (The Little Girl Who Lives Down the Lane) and screenwriter (Bloodline, Inchon) (b. 1927)
