= Crown Heights =

Neighborhood of Brooklyn in New York City

- Neighborhood
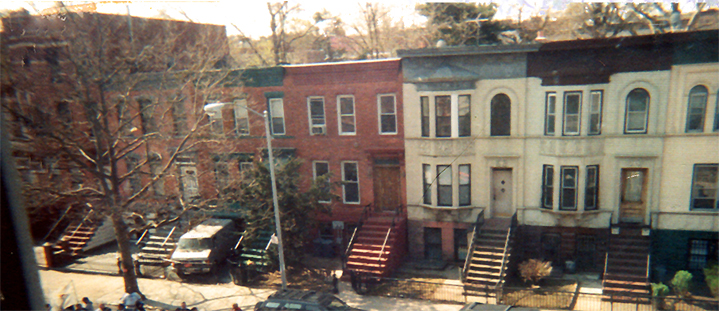
- Typical Crown Heights row houses
- Interactive map of Crown Heights
- Coordinates: 40.673°N 73.946°W
- Country: United States
- State: New York
- City: New York City
- Borough: Brooklyn
- Community District: Brooklyn 8, Brooklyn 9

Area
  - Total: 1.418 sq mi (3.67 km^{2})

Population (2016)
  - Total: 143,000
  - Density: 101,000/sq mi (38,900/km^{2})

Ethnicity
  - Black: 48.8%
  - White: 30.8%
  - Hispanic: 14.1%
  - Asian: 3.2%

Economics
  - Median income: $45,776
- Time zone: UTC−5 (Eastern)
  - Summer (DST): UTC−4 (EDT)
- ZIP Codes: 11213, 11216, 11225, 11233, 11238
- Area code: 718, 347, 929, and 917

Crown Heights is a neighborhood in the central portion of the New York City borough of Brooklyn. Crown Heights is bounded by Washington Avenue to the west, Atlantic Avenue to the north, Ralph Avenue to the east, and Empire Boulevard to the south. It is about one mile (1.6 km) wide and two miles (3.2 km) long. Neighborhoods bordering Crown Heights include Prospect Heights to the west, Flatbush, Prospect Lefferts Gardens and East Flatbush to the south, Brownsville to the east, and Bedford–Stuyvesant to the north.

The main thoroughfare through this neighborhood is Eastern Parkway, a tree-lined boulevard designed by Frederick Law Olmsted in the late-1800s, extending two miles (3.2 km) east–west. Earlier, the area was sometimes known as Crow Hill, with a succession of ridges running east and west from Utica Avenue to Washington Avenue, and south to Empire Boulevard and East New York Avenue. When Crown Street was cut through in 1916, the area became known as the heights.

The northern half of Crown Heights is part of Brooklyn Community District 8 and is patrolled by the 77th Precinct of the New York City Police Department (NYPD). The southern half is part of Brooklyn Community District 9 and is patrolled by the 71st Precinct of the NYPD. Crown Heights's primary ZIP Codes are 11213, 11216, 11225, 11233, and 11238. Politically, it is represented by the New York City Council's 35th, 36th, and 41st Districts.

== History ==
=== Early history ===
Although no known physical evidence remains in the Crown Heights vicinity, large portions of what is now called Long Island including present-day Brooklyn were occupied by the Lenape Native Americans. The Lenape lived in communities of bark- or grass-covered wigwams, and in their larger settlements—typically located on high ground adjacent to fresh water, and occupied in the fall, winter, and spring—they fished, harvested shellfish, trapped animals, gathered wild fruits and vegetables, and cultivated corn, tobacco, beans, and other crops.

The first recorded contact between the indigenous people of the New York City region and Europeans was with the Italian explorer Giovanni da Verrazzano in 1524 in the service of France when he anchored at the approximate location where the Verrazzano–Narrows Bridge touches down in Brooklyn today. There he was visited by a canoe party of Lenape. The next contact was in 1609 when the explorer Henry Hudson arrived in what is now New York Harbor aboard a Dutch East India Company ship, the Halve Maen (Half Moon) commissioned by the Dutch Republic.

European habitation in the New York City area began in earnest with the founding of a Dutch fur trading settlement, later called "Nieuw Amsterdam" (New Amsterdam), on the southern tip of Manhattan in 1614. By 1630, Dutch and English colonists started moving into the western end of Long Island. In 1637, Joris Jansen de Rapalje purchased about 335 acres (1.36 km^{2}) around Wallabout Bay and over the following two years, director Kieft of the Dutch West India Company purchased title to nearly all the land in what is now Kings County and Queens County from the indigenous inhabitants.

Finally, the area around present-day Crown Heights saw its first European settlements starting in about 1661/1662 when several men each received, from Governor Peter Stuyvesant and the directors of the Dutch West India Company what was described as "a parcel of free (unoccupied) woodland there" on the condition that they situate their houses "within one of the other concentration, which would suit them best, but not to make a hamlet."

=== 19th century ===
In the 19th century, the area was rural. The Crow Hill penitentiary and various orphanages were located in the area at the time. In 1884, Alexander Jefferson was killed during a prolonged hanging after being convicted of the Crow Hill Murders. Appeals seeking to overturn his death sentence documented the significant poverty in the area at the time.

=== Early and mid-20th century ===
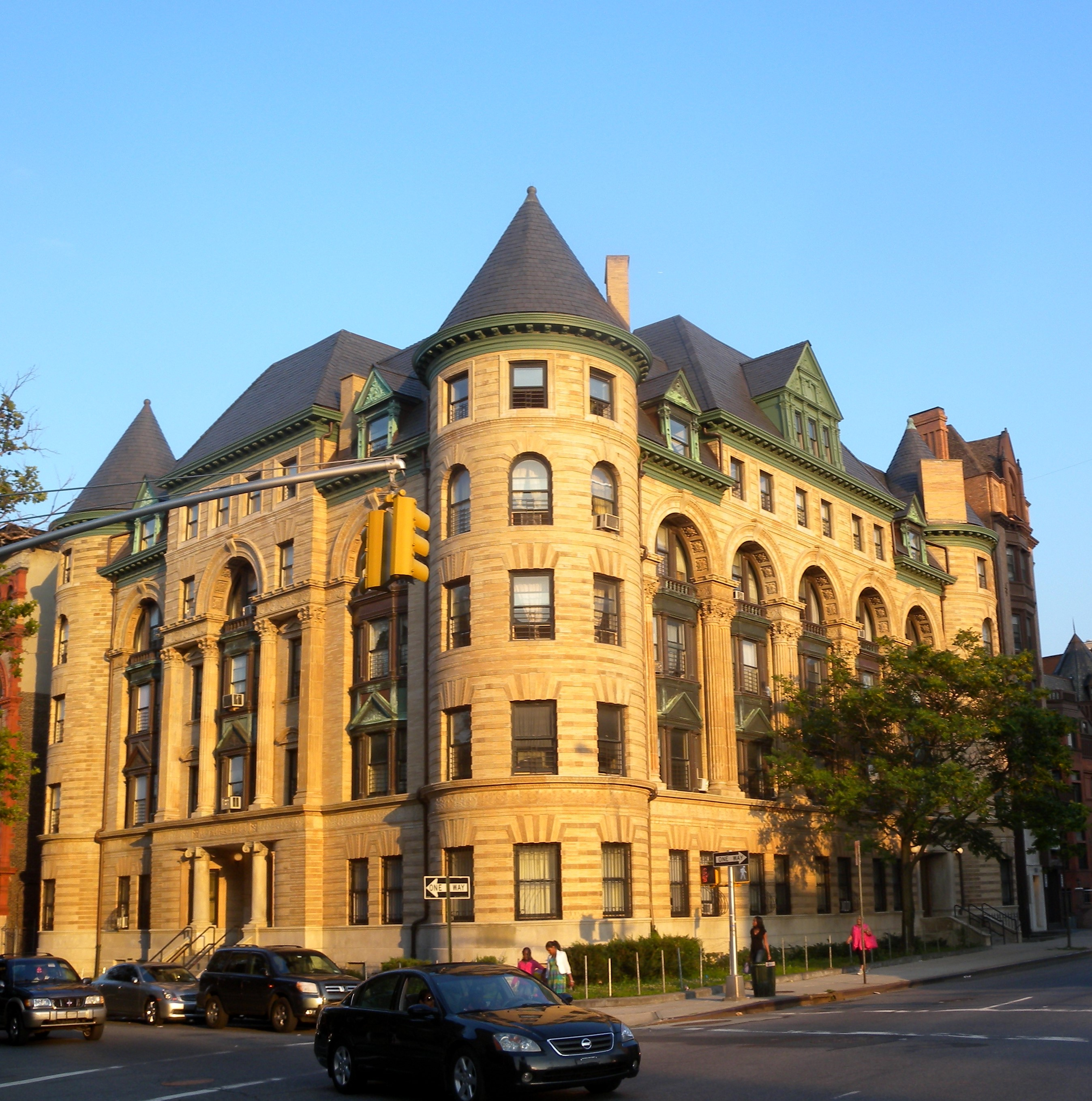
Imperial Apartments on Bedford Avenue, built in 1892

Crown Heights had begun as a fashionable residential neighborhood, a place for secondary homes in which Manhattan's growing bourgeois class could reside. The area benefited by having its rapid transit in a subway configuration, the IRT Eastern Parkway Line (2, 3, 4, and 5 trains), in contrast to many other Brooklyn neighborhoods, which had elevated lines. Conversion to a commuter town also included tearing down the 19th century Kings County Penitentiary at Carroll Street and Nostrand Avenue.

Beginning in the early 1900s, many upper-class residences, including characteristic brownstone buildings, were erected along Eastern Parkway. Away from the parkway were a mixture of lower middle-class residences. This development peaked in the 1920s. Before World War II, Crown Heights was among New York City's premier neighborhoods, with tree-lined streets, an array of cultural institutions and parks, and numerous fraternal, social and community organizations.

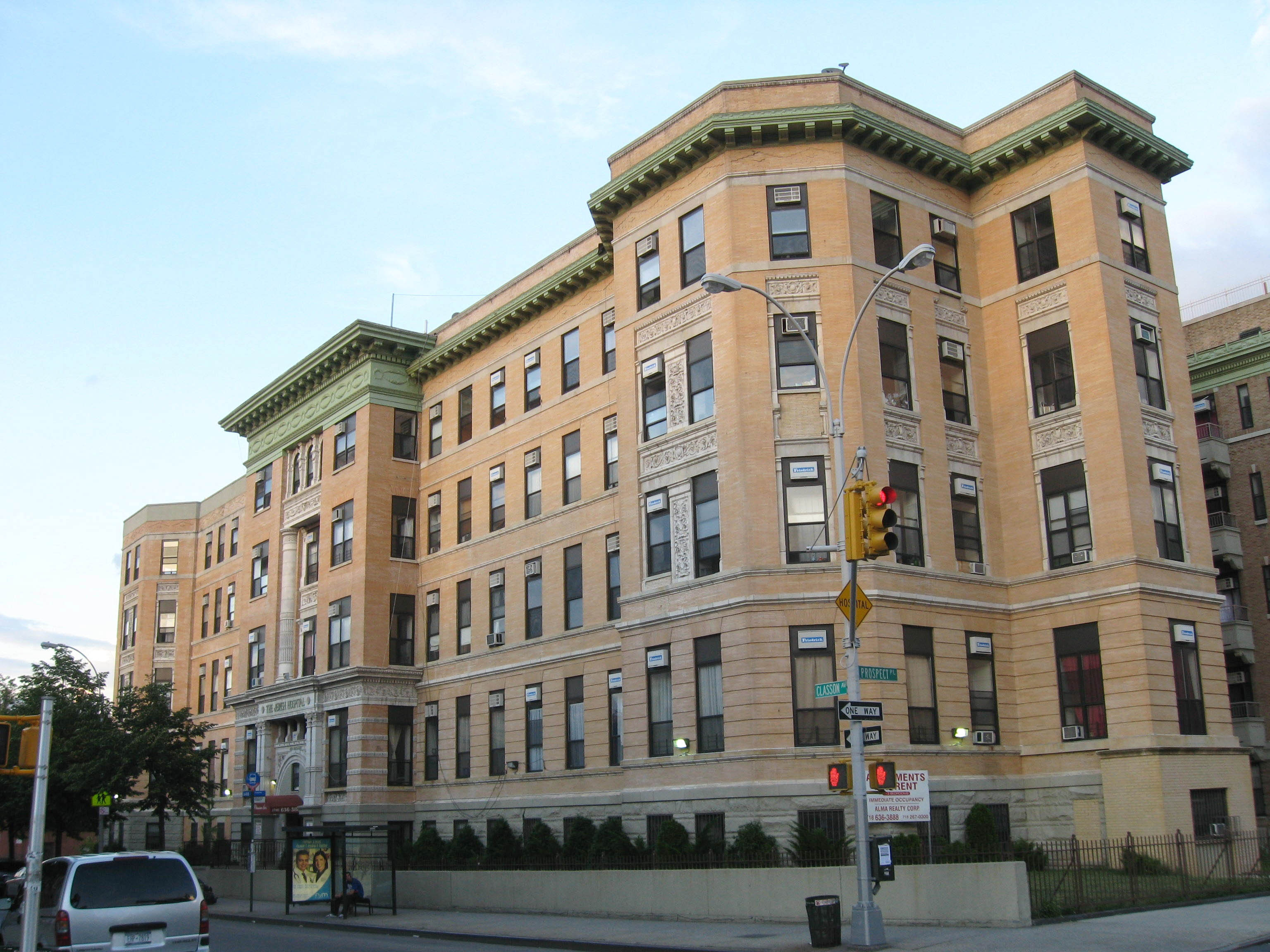
The former Jewish Hospital of Brooklyn, now an apartment building

From the early 1920s through the 1960s, Crown Heights was predominantly Ashkenazi Jewish reflecting the demographics of the city, at the time. In 1950, some 50 to 60 percent, or about 75,000 people, were Jewish. Many of them were Holocaust survivors and recent arrivals from Displaced Persons Camps in the Allied Zones of Occupation of Germany. (During this time period, Jews were not considered white as they are by many today; Jews faced discrimination, such as including being barred from hotels and restaurants and being denied employment in certain professions or companies. They also faced quotas at universities.) New arrivals from the West Indies and the American South created a growing Black presence. By 1957, there were about 25,000 Black people in Crown Heights, making up about one-fourth of the population. Around the same time, suburbanization began to rapidly affect Crown Heights and Brooklyn. Robert Moses expanded the borough's access to eastern Long Island through expressway construction; by way of the G.I. Bill, many families moved east. As the Jewish, Irish and Italian populations of Crown Heights moved out of the neighborhood as the housing stock deteriorated and crime rapidly escalated, black people from the south and immigrants from the Caribbean continued to move there. The 1957 departure of the Brooklyn Dodgers and the destruction of Ebbets Field for public housing for its Black population symbolically served as the end of the old Crown Heights and in the 1960s the neighborhood experienced mass white flight. The demographic change was astounding; by 1970 the neighborhood was 70% Black. The one exception to this pattern were the Lubavitch Hasidic Jewish Community, who remain there today.

There were thirty-four large synagogues in the neighborhood, including the Bobov, Chovevei Torah, and 770 Eastern Parkway, home of the worldwide Lubavitch movement. There were also three prominent Yeshiva elementary schools in the neighborhood, Crown Heights Yeshiva on Crown Street, the Yeshiva of Eastern Parkway, and the Reines Talmud Torah.

=== Late 20th century ===
The 1960s and 1970s were a time of turbulent race relations in the area: with increasing poverty in the city, racial conflict plagued some of its neighborhoods, including Crown Heights, with its racially and culturally mixed populations. At the request of their leader, the Lubavitcher Rebbe Menachem Mendel Schneerson, the neighborhood's mostly white and relatively large population of Lubavitch Hasidim stayed in the community as other whites were leaving.

In 1964 the Labor Day Carnival celebrating Caribbean culture was moved to the neighborhood when its license to run in Harlem was revoked. It now attracts between one and three million people and is held on the first Monday in September.

During the Lyndon B. Johnson administration, Crown Heights was declared a primary poverty area due to a high unemployment rate, high juvenile and adult crime rate, poor nutrition due to lack of family income, relative absence of job skills and readiness, and a relatively high concentration of elderly residents. Violence broke out several times in the neighborhood during the late 20th century, including during the New York City blackout of 1977: More than 75 area stores were robbed, and thieves used cars to pull up roll-down curtains in front of stores.

In 1991, there was a three-day outbreak known as the Crown Heights riot, which started between the neighborhood's West Indian/African American and Jewish communities. The riots began on August 19, 1991, after Gavin Cato, the son of two Guyanese immigrants, was struck and killed by a car in the motorcade of prominent Hasidic rabbi Menachem Mendel Schneerson. A mob began to attack a Jewish volunteer ambulance, which withdrew. Rumors, which later proved to be unfounded, circulated that the ambulance refused to treat Gavin Cato's injuries while removing members of Schneerson's motorcade instead. Yankel Rosenbaum, a visiting rabbinical student from Australia, was killed in the riot, while Jews were assaulted, and there was property damage amid rock throwing in the ensuing riots. The riot unveiled long-simmering tensions between the neighborhood's Black and Jewish communities, which impacted the 1993 mayoral race and ultimately led to a successful outreach program between Black and Jewish leaders that somewhat helped improve race relations in the city. Through the 1990s, crime, racial conflict, and violence decreased in the city and urban renewal and gentrification began to take effect including in Crown Heights.

=== Early 21st century ===
In the 2010s, Crown Heights experienced rapid gentrification. In some areas the increasing rents have caused the displacement of long-time residents. Not only did rents for each apartment increase drastically but building management firms such as BCB Realty, affiliated with companies that buy up buildings in the neighborhood, aimed to remove long-term residents by buying them out or pressuring them to move by "failing to adequately maintain apartments", according to a housing activist, with the aim of forcing out the rent-stabilized. Other tactics include relocating residents from their apartments claiming renovation and locking them out, as employed by another realtor in the neighborhood, ZT Realty. In 2017, real estate developer Isaac Hager faced opposition from activists when he proposed building a 565-unit apartment complex in Crown Heights; in April 2019, a judge issued a restraining order against the project.

In the wake of the 2010 opening of Basil Pizza & Wine Bar, a series of upscale, kosher, foodie restaurants opened in Crown Heights, which The Jewish Week described as "an eating destination".

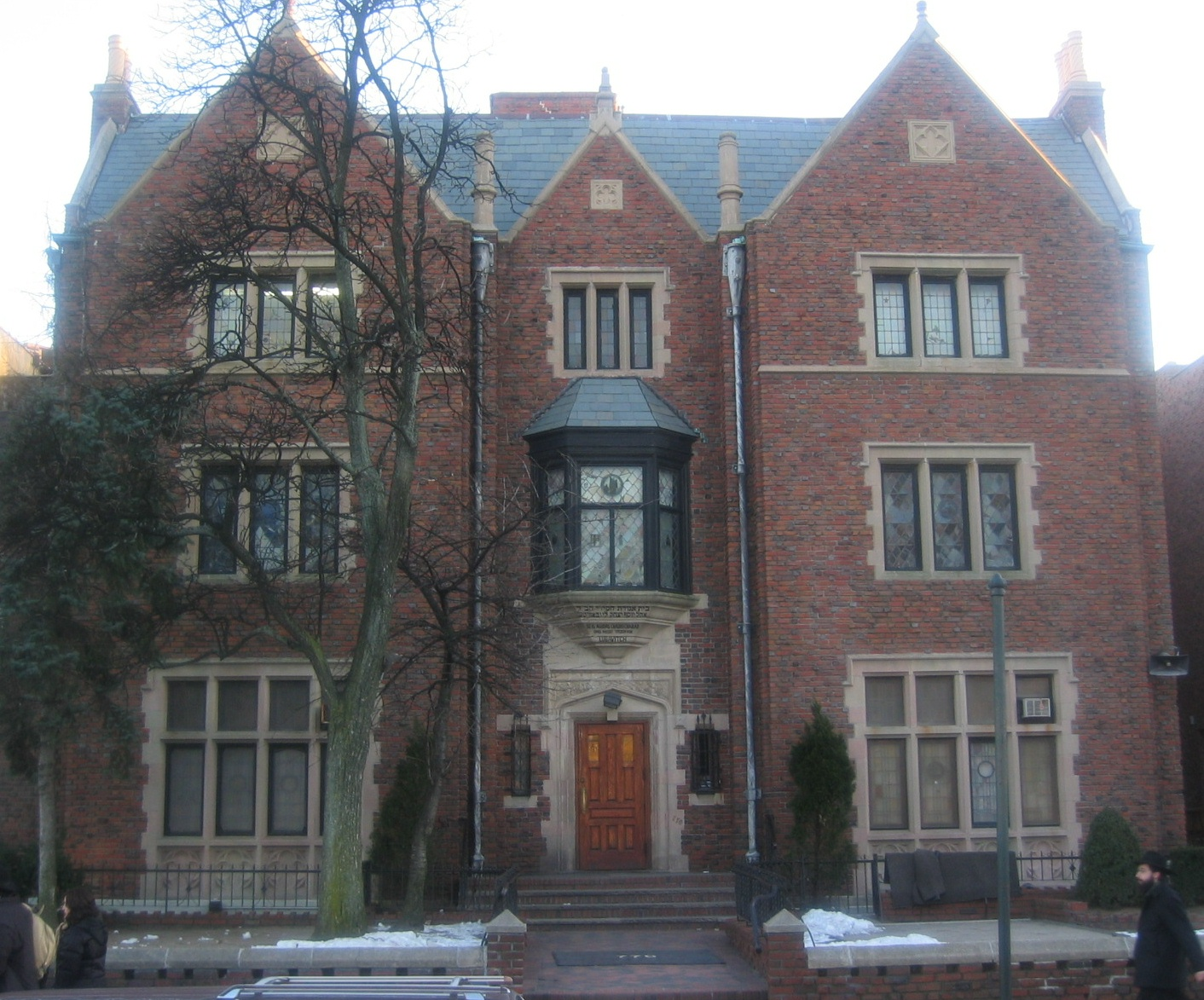
770 Eastern Parkway the headquarters of the Chabad movement

In November 2013, a series of attacks on Jewish residents were suspected to be part of "knockout games". Media attention to knockout attacks increased following the incidents in Crown Heights. In response to the violence, the Jewish community hosted an event for African-American teens, designed to promote greater understanding of Jews and their beliefs. The event, hosted by the Jewish Children's Museum, was coordinated by local Jewish organizations, public schools, and by the NYPD's 71st and 77th precincts.

On January 8, 2024, clashes broke out at the World Headquarters of the Chabad-Lubavitch movement at 770 Eastern Parkway, after a group tried to stop workers who were trying to infill an illegal tunnel excavated by students; the incident resulted in nine arrests.

== Demographics ==
Crown Heights is divided into two neighborhood tabulation areas, Crown Heights North and Crown Heights South, which collectively comprise the population of Crown Heights.

Crown Heights has a majority West Indian and African American population according to the 2010 census. Reflecting the most varied U.S. population of Caribbean immigrants outside the West Indies, Crown Heights is known for its annual West Indian Carnival. The vivid celebration goes along Eastern Parkway, from Utica Avenue to Grand Army Plaza. According to the West Indian-American Day Carnival Association, over 3.5 million people participate in the parade each year.

Crown Heights also contains a significant number of Hasidic Jews. It is the location of the Worldwide Headquarters of the Chabad-Lubavitch Hasidic Jewish movement, at 770 Eastern Parkway. An Orthodox Jewish community which established itself in Crown Heights in the 1940s has continued to thrive around that location.

=== Crown Heights North ===
Based on data from the 2010 United States census, the population of Crown Heights North was 103,169, a change of -293 (-0.3%) from the 103,462 counted in 2000. Covering an area of 1,185.56 acres (479.78 ha), the neighborhood had a population density of 87 inhabitants per acre (56,000/sq mi; 21,000/km^{2}).

The racial makeup of the neighborhood was 49% African American, 31% White, 3% Asian, 0.2% Native American, 0% Pacific Islander, 0.4% from other races, and 1.9% from two or more races. Hispanic or Latino of any race were 14% of the population.

The entirety of Community District 8, which covers Crown Heights North, had 97,130 inhabitants as of NYC Health's 2018 Community Health Profile, with an average life expectancy of 79.2 years. This is lower than the median life expectancy of 81.2 for all New York City neighborhoods. Most inhabitants are middle-aged adults and youth: 20% are between the ages of 0–17, 37% between 25 and 44, and 22% between 45 and 64. The ratio of college-aged and elderly residents was lower, at 9% and 12% respectively.

As of 2016, the median household income in Community District 8 was $60,107. In 2018, an estimated 21% of Crown Heights North residents lived in poverty, compared to 21% in all of Brooklyn and 20% in all of New York City. One in eleven residents (9%) were unemployed, compared to 9% in the rest of both Brooklyn and New York City. Rent burden, or the percentage of residents who have difficulty paying their rent, is 50% in Crown Heights North, lower than the citywide and boroughwide rates of 52% and 51% respectively. Based on this calculation, as of 2018, Crown Heights North is considered to be gentrifying.

According to the 2020 census data from New York City Department of City Planning, there is still an overwhelming Black population majority of 40,000 or more residents, but there is a diverse cultural population with each of the White and Hispanic populations at between 10,000 and 19,999 residents.

=== Crown Heights South ===
Based on data from the 2010 United States census, the population of Crown Heights South was 39,670, a change of -2,700 (-6.8%) from the 42,370 counted in 2000. Covering an area of 366.94 acres (148.50 ha), the neighborhood had a population density of 108.1 inhabitants per acre (69,200/sq mi; 26,700/km^{2}).

The racial makeup of the neighborhood was 62.8% (24,921) African American, 25.8% (10,221) White, 0.7% (285) Asian, 0.2% (81) Native American, 0% (12) Pacific Islander, 0.3% (127) from other races, and 1.5% (601) from two or more races. Hispanic or Latino of any race were 8.6% (3,422) of the population.

The entirety of Community District 9, which covers Crown Heights South, had 98,650 inhabitants as of NYC Health's 2018 Community Health Profile, with an average life expectancy of 81.2 years. This is equal to the median life expectancy of all New York City neighborhoods. Most inhabitants are middle-aged adults and youth: 22% are between the ages of 0–17, 30% between 25 and 44, and 25% between 45 and 64. The ratio of college-aged and elderly residents was lower, at 9% and 14% respectively.

As of 2016, the median household income in Community District 9 was $51,072. In 2018, an estimated 22% of Crown Heights South residents lived in poverty, compared to 21% in all of Brooklyn and 20% in all of New York City. One in nine residents (11%) were unemployed, compared to 9% in the rest of both Brooklyn and New York City. Rent burden, or the percentage of residents who have difficulty paying their rent, is 55% in Crown Heights South, higher than the citywide and boroughwide rates of 52% and 51% respectively. Based on this calculation, as of 2018, Crown Heights South is considered to be gentrifying.

As of the 2020 census, according to New York City Department of City Planning, there were between 20,000 and 29,999 Black residents and 10,000 to 19,999 White residents. The concentration of Black residents in South Crown Heights is slightly lower than North Crown Heights.

== Politics ==
The neighborhood is part of New York's 9th congressional district, represented by Democrat Yvette Clarke since 2013. It is also part of the 19th and 20th State Senate districts, represented by Democrats Roxanne Persaud and Zellnor Myrie, and the 43rd and 57th State Assembly districts, represented respectively by Democrats Brian A. Cunningham and Phara Souffrant Forrest. Crown Heights is located in New York's 35th and 36th City Council districts, represented respectively by Democrats Crystal Hudson and Chi Ossé. As compared to most other parts of New York City, however, Crown Heights is more politically moderate; several of its precincts voted for Donald Trump in the 2020 United States presidential election.

Crown Heights is served by Brooklyn Community Board 8 north of Eastern Parkway and Brooklyn Community Board 9 south of Eastern Parkway.

== Police and crime ==
Crown Heights is patrolled by two precincts of the NYPD. Crown Heights North is covered by the 77th Precinct, located at 127 Utica Avenue, while Crown Heights South is patrolled by the 71st Precinct, located at 421 Empire Boulevard.

The 77th Precinct ranked 42nd safest out of 69 patrol areas for per-capita crime in 2010, while the 71st Precinct ranked 46th safest. As of 2018, with a non-fatal assault rate of 85 per 100,000 people in Crown Heights North and 73 per 100,000 people in Crown Heights South, both areas' rates of violent crimes per capita are greater than that of the city as a whole. The incarceration rates of 872 per 100,000 people in Crown Heights North and 598 per 100,000 people in Crown Heights South are both greater than that of the city as a whole.

The 77th Precinct has a lower crime rate than in the 1990s, with crimes across all categories having decreased by 85.7% between 1990 and 2018. The precinct reported 2 murders, 32 rapes, 180 robberies, 297 felony assaults, 158 burglaries, 397 grand larcenies, and 72 grand larcenies auto in 2018. The 71st Precinct also has a lower crime rate than in the 1990s, with crimes across all categories having decreased by 82.7% between 1990 and 2018. The precinct reported 8 murders, 26 rapes, 166 robberies, 349 felony assaults, 143 burglaries, 464 grand larcenies, and 68 grand larcenies auto in 2018.

== Fire safety ==
The New York City Fire Department (FDNY) operates four fire stations in Crown Heights:

- Engine Company 234/Ladder Company 123/Battalion 38 – 1352 St Johns Place
- Rescue 2 – 1472 Bergen Street
- Engine Company 280/Ladder Company 132 – 489 St Johns Place
- Engine Company 227 – 423 Ralph Avenue

== Health ==
As of 2018, preterm births in Crown Heights and births to teenage mothers in Crown Heights North are more common than in other places citywide, though births to teenage mothers in Crown Heights South are less common than in other places citywide. There were 92 preterm births per 1,000 live births in Crown Heights North and 91 preterm births per 1,000 live births in Crown Heights South (compared to 87 per 1,000 citywide). Additionally, there were 24.6 births to teenage mothers per 1,000 live births in Crown Heights North and 14.8 births to teenage mothers per 1,000 live births in Crown Heights South (compared to 19.3 per 1,000 citywide). Both neighborhoods have a relatively high population of residents who are uninsured, or who receive healthcare through Medicaid. In 2018, this population of uninsured residents was estimated to be 12% in Crown Heights North and 16% in Crown Heights South, compared to the citywide rate of 12%.

The concentration of fine particulate matter, the deadliest type of air pollutant, is 0.008 milligrams per cubic metre (8.0×10^{−9} oz/ft^{3}) in Crown Heights North and 0.0078 milligrams per cubic metre (7.8×10^{−9} oz/ft^{3}) in Crown Heights South, slightly higher than the citywide and boroughwide averages. Eighteen percent of Crown Heights North residents and eight percent of Crown Heights South residents are smokers, compared to the city average of 14% of residents being smokers. In Crown Heights North, 26% of residents are obese, 13% are diabetic, and 33% have high blood pressure—compared to the citywide averages of 24%, 11%, and 28% respectively. By comparison, in Crown Heights South, 32% of residents are obese, 15% are diabetic, and 37% have high blood pressure. In addition, 19% of children are obese in both Crown Heights North and South, compared to the citywide average of 20%.

Eighty-four percent of Crown Heights North and eighty-one percent of Crown Heights South residents eat some fruits and vegetables every day, which is slightly lower than the city's average of 87%. In 2018, 78% of Crown Heights North and 84% of Crown Heights South residents described their health as "good", "very good", or "excellent", compared to than the city's average of 78%. For every supermarket, there are 25 bodegas in Crown Heights North and 21 bodegas in Crown Heights South.

== Post offices and ZIP Codes ==
Crown Heights North is covered by ZIP Codes 11238, 11216, 11213, and 11233 from west to east, while Crown Heights South is covered by ZIP Codes 11225 and 11213 from west to east. The United States Postal Service operates two post offices nearby: the Saint Johns Place Station at 1234 St Johns Place, and the James E Davis Station at 315 Empire Boulevard.

== Education ==
Crown Heights generally has a similar ratio of college-educated residents to the rest of the city as of 2018. In Crown Heights North, 44% of residents age 25 and older have a college education or higher, while 16% have less than a high school education and 40% are high school graduates or have some college education. In Crown Heights South, 35% of residents age 25 and older have a college education or higher, while 16% have less than a high school education and 48% are high school graduates or have some college education. By contrast, 40% of Brooklynites and 38% of city residents have a college education or higher. The percentage of Crown Heights North students excelling in reading and math has been increasing, with reading achievement rising from 31 percent in 2000 to 37 percent in 2011, and math achievement rising from 22 percent to 47 percent within the same time period. In Crown Heights South, reading achievement rose from 31 percent in 2000 to 37 percent in 2011, and math achievement rose from 21 percent to 47 percent within the same time period.

Crown Heights' rates of elementary school student absenteeism are higher than the rest of New York City. The proportions of elementary school students who missed twenty or more days per school year were 28% in Crown Heights North and 22% in Crown Heights South, compared to the citywide average of 20% of students. Additionally, 71% of high school students in Crown Heights North and 77% of high school students in Crown Heights South graduate on time, compared to the citywide average of 75% of students.

=== Schools ===
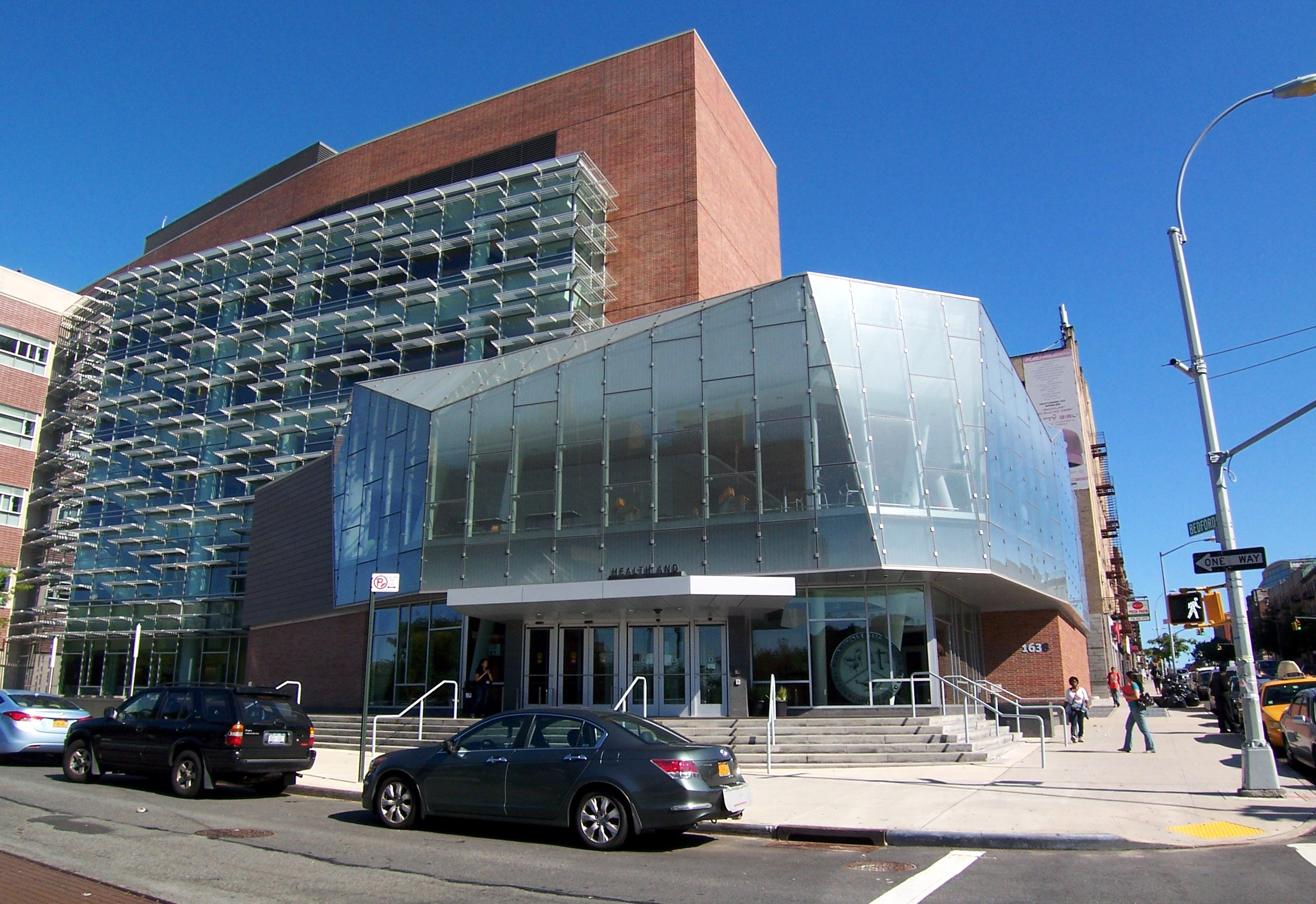
Medgar Evers College, Building A

Among the public schools are the International Arts Business School, The League School, The School for Human Rights, The School for Democracy and Leadership and the High School for Public Service: Heroes of Tomorrow, all on the campus of the now-closed George W. Wingate High School, and Success Academy Crown Heights, part of Success Academy Charter Schools. M.S. 587, New Heights Middle School, Achievement First Crown Heights Elementary School, and Achievement First Crown Heights Middle School are all located in Crown Heights, housed in the Mahalia Jackson School building. Explore Empower Charter School is also located in Crown Heights. The PS 373 Brooklyn Transition Center at H594K, serving grades 9–12, is located at 561 Grand Avenue at the border of Crown Heights and Prospect Heights.

Medgar Evers College is an institution of higher education in the neighborhood.

The orthodox Jewish community is serviced by gender-segregated schools. Among the girls schools are Beth Rivkah Academy, founded in 1941 by the sixth Lubavitcher Rebbe, Yosef Yitzchak Schneerson, as the oldest Chasidic school for girls; the school now hosts preschool through higher learning institutions. Newer schools include Bnos Menachem, Bais Chaya Mushka, Bnos Chomesh and Chabad Girls Academy. The boys are educated at Oholei Torah, Yeshiva Tomchei Temimim Lubavitch, Cheder Ohr Menachem, Gan Academy, Darchei Menachem and various other smaller schools.

=== Libraries ===
The Brooklyn Public Library (BPL) has three branches in Crown Heights:

- The Crown Heights branch, on the border with Flatbush/Prospect Lefferts Gardens, is located at 560 New York Avenue near Maple Street. The branch was built in 1958 as part of a plan by mayor Abraham Beame.
- The Brower Park branch is located on the ground floor of the Brooklyn Children's Museum. The original Brower Park branch at 725 St. Marks Avenue was built in 1963 under the Beame plan; at the time, it was northern Brooklyn's first new library in four decades. A new library was announced in 2017, and the original building at 725 St. Marks Avenue was vacated in 2020. Brower Park Library reopened for lobby service in the Brooklyn Children's Museum in 2021, with full service resuming in 2023.
- The Eastern Parkway branch and Eastern Parkway Learning Center is located at 1044 Eastern Parkway at Schenectady Avenue. It is a two-story, limestone-clad Carnegie library branch with 12,000 square feet (1,100 m^{2}) of floor space. The branch was renovated at least four times, most recently in 2016.

== Transportation ==
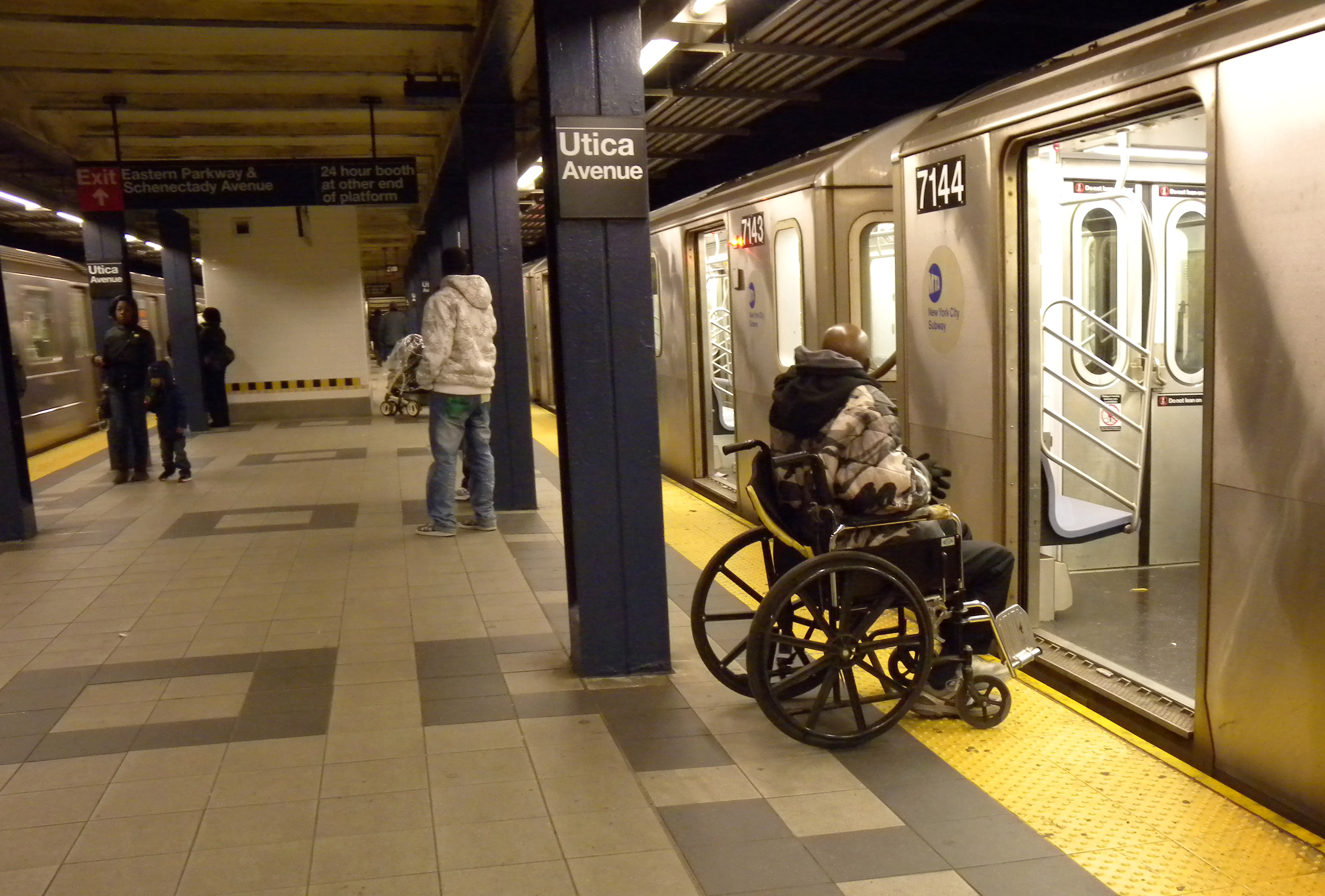
Crown Heights–Utica Avenue station

Crown Heights is served by the New York City Subway's IRT Eastern Parkway Line, with stations at Franklin Avenue (2, 3, 4, and 5 trains), Nostrand Avenue (3 train), Kingston Avenue (3 train), and Utica Avenue (3 and 4 trains). It is also served by the IRT Nostrand Avenue Line at President and Sterling Streets (2 and 5 trains). The subway's BMT Franklin Avenue Line, served by the S train contains stations at Botanic Garden and Park Place. The IND Fulton Street line runs on its namesake street, 2 blocks north of the border between Crown Heights and Bedford-Stuyvesant, stopping in the Crown Heights area from Clinton-Washington Avenues to Ralph Avenue and Broadway Junction. Just east of the Utica Avenue station, on the border with Brownsville, there is a park called Lincoln Terrace (also known as Arthur S. Somers Park), which slopes gently down toward the southern Brooklyn coastline; the IRT New Lots Line transitions from a tunnel to an elevated structure within this park.

Several bus lines serve the area, including the B12, B14, B15, B17, B43, B44, B44 SBS, B45, B46, B46 SBS, B47 and B65.

== Recreation ==
Crown Heights has one botanical garden:

- Brooklyn Botanic Garden

There are also four museums in Crown Heights:

- Brooklyn Museum
- Brooklyn Children's Museum
- Jewish Children's Museum
- Weeksville Heritage Center

Crown Heights has several parks:

- Prospect Park and Mount Prospect Park runs along Crown Heights' western edge.
- Brower Park
- St. John's Park and Recreation Center
- Hamilton Metz Field
- Wingate Park
- Parkside Playground

== Landmarks and places of interest ==
=== Commercial ===
Street signs at the corner of Kingston Avenue and Empire Boulevard in Crown Heights, fall 2026.

The primary commercial corridors in Crown Heights are Franklin Avenue, Nostrand Avenue, Kingston Avenue, and Utica Avenue. Kingston Avenue has a high concentration of business serving the needs of the neighborhood's Hasidic community. Atlantic Avenue, which forms the northern border of Crown Heights, is dominated by auto-oriented commercial uses, including repair shops and gas stations. However, a 2025 rezoning led by New York City Council members Crystal Hudson and Chi Ossé legalized the construction of apartments on Atlantic Avenue between Vanderbilt Avenue and Nostrand Avenue.

=== Notable locations ===
- 23rd Regiment Armory
- 770 Eastern Parkway (central headquarters of the Chabad-Lubavitch Hasidic movement)
- Crown Heights North Historic District
- Ebbets Field Apartments
- former Empire Roller Disco
- George W. Wingate High School
- Hunterfly Road Historic District
- Kol Israel Synagogue
- Medgar Evers College
- former Nassau Brewing Company
- Park Place Historic District
- St. Bartholomew's Protestant Episcopal Church and Rectory

== Notable people ==
- Abraham Abraham (1843–1911), businessman who was the founder of the department store Abraham & Straus in 1865
- Bob Arum (born 1931), founder and CEO of Top Rank, a professional boxing promotion company
- Abraham Beame (1906–2001), 104th mayor of New York City, serving from 1974 to 1977
- Robert S. Bennett (born 1939), attorney who represented President Bill Clinton during the Lewinsky scandal
- William Bennett (born 1943), Secretary of Education under President Ronald Reagan
- Oni Blackstock, primary care and HIV physician, researcher, and founder of Health Justice, a racial and health equity consulting practice
- Uché Blackstock, physician
- James Bouknight (born 2000), professional basketball player
- Steve Bracey (1950-2006), NBA basketball player
- Buckshot (born 1974), rapper
- Shirley Chisholm (1924–2005), educator and politician
- Iris Cantor (born 1931), philanthropist
- Clive Davis (1932-2026), music industry executive
- James E. Davis (1962–2003), police officer, corrections officer, councilmember, minister and community activist
- Byron Donalds (born 1978), politician and businessman serving as the U.S. representative for Florida's 19th congressional district since 2021
- Israel Englander (born 1948), billionaire hedge fund manager
- Joseph Esposito (born 1950), NYC Emergency Management commissioner, started as a beat cop in Crown Heights
- Bobby Fischer (1943 – 2008), chess grandmaster and the 11th World Chess Champion .
- Phara Souffrant Forrest (born 1989), member of the New York State Assembly from the 57th district
- Avraham Fried (born 1959), Hasidic singer
- Benny Friedman (born 1984), Hasidic singer
- Yitzchak Ginsburgh (born 1944), American-born Israeli rabbi
- Allen Grubman, entertainment lawyer
- Maggie Haberman (born 1973), journalist
- Jamie Hector (born 1975), actor, portrays Marlo Stanfield on the HBO series The Wire
- Sidney "Sonny" Hertzberg (1922–2005), professional basketball player who played for the New York Knicks
- Regina Herzlinger (born c. 1944), professor at Harvard Business School
- Gavriel Holtzberg (1979–2008), murdered Orthodox rabbi and Chabad emissary to Mumbai, India
- J.I the Prince of N.Y (born 2001), rapper
- Simon Jacobson (born 1956), rabbi, author and journalist
- Yosef Yitzchak Jacobson (born 1972), rabbi and orator
- Hakeem Jeffries (born 1970), U.S. Representative (NY-8), leader of the House Democratic Caucus, and House Minority Leader
- Harold S. Koplewicz (born 1953), child and adolescent psychiatrist
- Harold Kushner (1935–2023), rabbi, author, and lecturer; wrote When Bad Things Happen to Good People and When All You've Ever Wanted Isn't Enough
- Carol Laderman (1932–2010), medical anthropologist.
- Nas (born 1973), famous hip-hop artist, songwriter, record producer and actor
- Norman Mailer (1923–2007), novelist, journalist and author
- Marty Markowitz (born 1945), former Brooklyn borough president
- Matisyahu Miller (born 1979), reggae artist
- Stephanie Mills (born 1957), singer
- Mark D. Naison (born 1946), professor of history and former political activist
- Lemrick Nelson (born 1975), convicted of violating Yankel Rosenbaum's civil rights in his murder during the 1991 Crown Heights riot
- Linda Nochlin (1931–2017), art historian best known for her pioneering 1971 article "Why Have There Been No Great Women Artists?"
- Mendy Pellin, Hasidic comedian
- Mary Pinkett (1926–2003), politician who served in the New York City Council from 1974 to 2001, representing the 28th and 35th districts, who was the first black New York City Councilwoman
- Harvey Pitt (1945–2023), lawyer and SEC chairman
- Aaron Raskin, religious leader, Chabad Lubavitch rabbi and author
- Diana Richardson (born 1983), politician who served as a member of the New York State Assembly from 2015 to 2022
- Kendall Schmidt (born 1990), television actor (Big Time Rush) and singer
- Menachem Mendel Schneerson (1902–1994), the seventh Rebbe of the Chabad-Lubavitch movement and one of the most influential Jewish leaders of the 20th century
- Meyer Seewald (born 1988) community activist, founder of the Jewish Community Watch, an organization whose mission is the prevention of child sex abuses in the Orthodox community
- Allie Sherman (1923–2015), National Football League player and head coach
- Sholom Shuchat (born 1984), Chabad-Lubavitch rabbi, dayan and posek
- Shyne (born 1978 as Jamal Barrow), rapper and politician
- Carl Sigman (1909–2000), songwriter
- Beverly Sills (1929–2007), opera singer and administrator
- Mighty Sparrow (born 1935), Calypso musician from Trinidad/West Indies
- Susan McKinney Steward (1847–1918), first African-American woman to earn a medical degree in New York
- Aaron Swartz (1986–2013), computer programmer, writer, archivist, political organizer, and internet activist
- William L. Taylor (1931–2010), attorney and civil rights advocate
- Simcha Weinstein (born 1975), author and rabbi
- Mendy Werdyger (born 1959), Hasidic Jewish singer, songwriter, and record store owner
- Yoni Z (born Yoni Zigelboum in 1991), Jewish recording artist, songwriter and entertainer

== In popular culture ==
=== Film ===
- Project 2x1, a 2013 documentary shot with Google Glass, features scenes shot by the Caribbean and Hasidic residents.
- Crown Heights (2004), a television film by Jeremy Kagan for Showtime.
- Crown Heights (2017)
- Brooklyn Babylon

=== Television ===
- Location for 4th season of High Maintenance (2016–2020)

=== Music ===
- The disco band Crown Heights Affair
- The 2004 song "King Without a Crown" by Matisyahu
- The song "Act Like U Want It" by Black Moon references Franklin Avenue
- The video "Moshpit" by Baby Keem
