= Brooklyn Children's Museum =

Children's museum in Brooklyn, New York

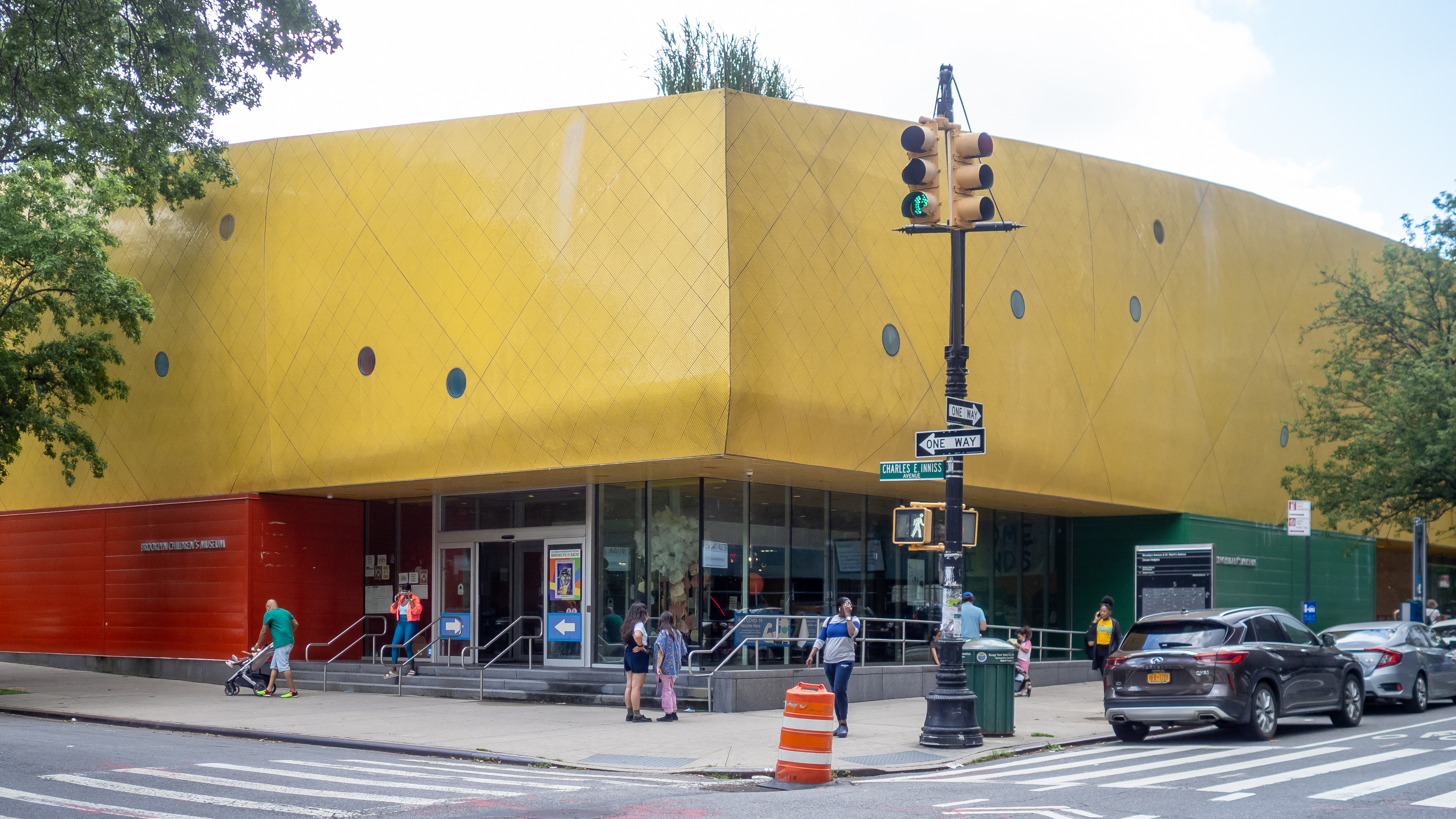
- The western side of the museum
- Established: 1899; 127 years ago
- Location: 145 Brooklyn Avenue, Crown Heights, Brooklyn, New York, U.S.
- Coordinates: 40.67448°N 73.9439°W
- Public transit access: Subway: Kingston Avenue; Kingston-Throop Avenues; Bus: B43, B44, B65
- Website: Official website

The Brooklyn Children's Museum is a children's museum in the Crown Heights neighborhood of Brooklyn in New York City. Founded in 1899, it is the first children's museum in the United States and, according to Time magazine, the world's oldest such museum. It is unusual in its location in what is predominantly a residential area. Housed in a multi-level underground gallery, the museum underwent an expansion and renovation to double its space, reopened on September 20, 2008, and became the first green museum in New York City.

== Exhibits ==
The museum's collection and exhibitions reflect its long history as well as the changes in children's educational needs over time and the changing environment. Its original focus was the presentation of natural science to children raised in an urban environment, but following World War II, technology and cultural awareness became more important. The underground gallery in which the museum was located following a 1975 move provided the ideal location for arranging evolving exhibits. The museum was not intended to solely attract the interest of a young audience, but rather to engage their minds from a young age. Children contribute extensively in the planning of museum exhibits, and have done so for a significant part of its history.

== History ==
=== Original museum ===
The Museum was founded following a proposal from the Brooklyn Institute of Arts and Sciences (now the Brooklyn Museum) on December 16, 1899, in the Adams House. The museum operated under the direction of the Brooklyn Institute and received approximately $70,000 in funds from New York City each year to supplement the donations it received. Attendance grew quickly, with monthly visitation exceeding 13,000 by October 1905.

In 1929, the museum opened the Smith House annex. In the 1930s, the Works Progress Administration supplied hundreds of workers to the museum, which thrived in the Great Depression. Among these workers was Ellis Credle, who painted murals before her career as an author began. By October 1930, monthly visitation had reached 60,000 and by 1939, the museum had received move than 9 million visitors since it opened back in 1899. In 1968 the Brooklyn Children's Museum opened MUSE, the Bedford Lincoln Neighborhood Museum.

=== Brower Park space ===
In 1975, the museum moved to a new space, housed underneath Brower Park at St Mark's and Brooklyn Avenues, following the demolition of the Victorian houses that served as its prior home. In 1996, the museum was once again renovated at a cost of $7 million to include miniature amphitheaters and a number of new galleries. Two years later, it became a part of Heart of Brooklyn, a cultural partnership established to promote tourism to Brooklyn.

In 2005, it was among 406 New York City arts and social service institutions to receive part of a $20 million grant from the Carnegie Corporation, which was made possible through a donation by New York City mayor Michael Bloomberg. In the same year, work began on the $43 million expansion that was to nearly double the size of the museum, and handle more than 400,000 visitors each year. As part of its commitment to environmental integrity and energy efficiency, the institution has taken credit for being the first New York City museum to use geothermal wells for heating and cooling purposes.

A section of the museum's building was converted into space for the Brower Park branch of Brooklyn Public Library, as part of a wider partnership between the museum and the library system. It opened in July 2023. Gans and Company was hired to design another renovation of the Brooklyn Children's Museum, which commenced in August 2024 at a cost of $15 million. The renovation was planned to include a 20,000-square-foot (1,900 m^{2}) courtyard, as well as a new retaining wall along Brower Park, and was to be completed in 2025.

== See also ==
- List of museums and cultural institutions in New York City
