= Overcoming Life's Disappointments =

Book by Harold Kushner

- Overcoming Life's Disappointments
- Author: Harold Kushner
- Language: English
- Subject: Theism; God; Religion
- Genre: Non-fiction
- Publisher: Anchor Books
- Publication date: 2006
- Publication place: United States
- Pages: 192 pp
- ISBN: 1-4000-3336-5
- Preceded by: The Lord Is My Shepherd: Healing Wisdom of the Twenty-third Psalm
- Followed by: Practice Random Acts of Kindness: Bring More Peace, Love, And Compassion

Overcoming Life's Disappointments (ISBN 1-4000-3336-5) is a 2006 book by Harold Kushner, a Conservative rabbi. Kushner addresses in the book the question of how to cope when disappointing things happen to you. He uses Biblical examples, such as how Moses coped with being denied entrance to The Promised Land, as well as secular examples, such as how Abraham Lincoln coped with depression. The emphasis is on the common disappointments faced by many throughout life, such as the breakup of a marriage, death of a loved one, loss of a job, or financial reversals.

Rabbi Kushner's book was a New York Times bestseller for many months in the "nonfiction" category.

== Recognition ==
- New York Times bestseller, "nonfiction"
