= Green museum =

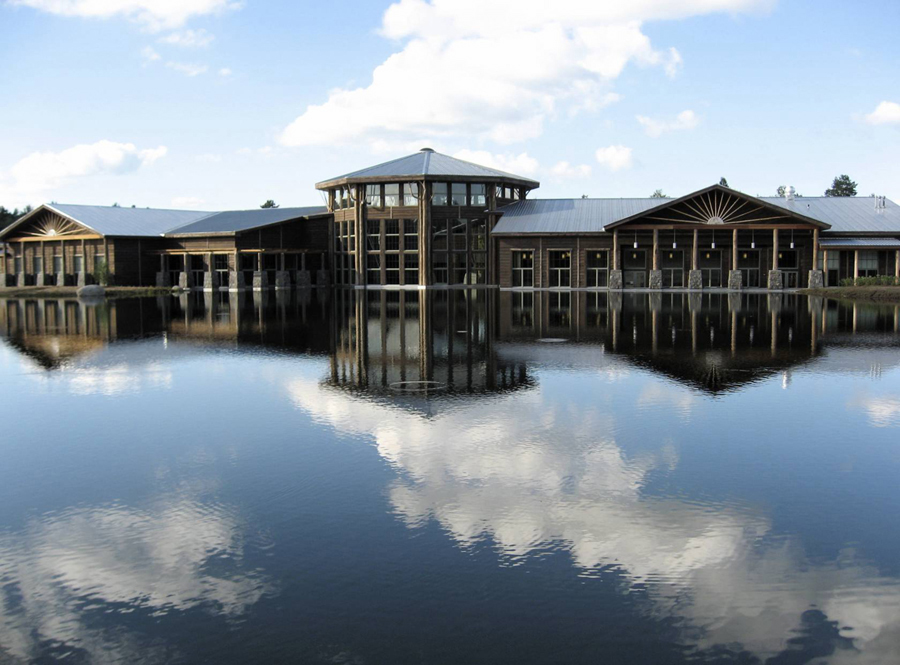
The Wild Center, a natural history museum in Tupper Lake, New York, United States

A green museum is a museum that incorporates concepts of sustainability into its operations, programming, and facility. Many green museums use their collections to produce exhibitions, events, classes, and other programming to educate the public about the natural environment. Many, but not all, green museums reside in a building featuring sustainable architecture and technology. Green museums interpret their own sustainable practices and green design to present a model of behavior.

Green museums strive to help people become more conscious of the limitations of their world, and how their actions affect their world. The goal is to create positive change by encouraging people to make sustainable choices in their daily lives. They use their position as community-centered institutions to create a culture of sustainability.

== Definitions ==
=== Museum ===
Museums make a "unique contribution to the public by collecting, preserving, and interpreting the things of this world", according to the American Alliance of Museums’ Code of Ethics. There are many types of museums that specialize in various fields, including anthropology, art, history, natural history, science, and can have living collections such as public aquariums, botanical gardens, nature centers, and zoos, or no collections like planetariums, and children's museums.

=== Green ===
The word "green" means environmentally thoughtful practice. The words "green" and "sustainable" are buzzwords often used interchangeably. However, according to Brophy and Wylie, "green" and "sustainable" have distinctly different definitions. "Green refers to products and behaviors that are environmentally benign, [...] while sustainable means practices that rely on renewable or reusable materials and processes that are green or environmentally benign." Another frequently cited definition for "sustainability" that is used in various contexts was developed by the United Nations (1987): "Development that meets the needs of the present without compromising the ability of the future generations to meet their own needs."

Sustainability reflects a complex system where components are closely linked and do not exist in isolation from one another. A sustainable system affects and is affected by the individual and collective behaviors of its members. Sustainability, therefore, recognizes the human impact on the environment, and aims to mitigate negative effects.

=== Culture of sustainability ===
Green museums aim to promote a culture of sustainability, which can be defined in two parts: culture, which includes the values, practices, beliefs and aspirations of a society. Whilst sustainability asks people to adapt at a cultural level, changing their beliefs and behavior.

Museums are in a unique position to establish and promote a culture of sustainability as they are arenas that simulataneousy preserve and create culture. As a result, museums are now considered to have a key role in shaping a sustainable future. These changes can be achieved through their exhibitions as well as their active engagement in debates surrounding climatic and environmental changes.

Museums have the capacity to influence visitor attitudes toward their local environment that can have a positive impact, for example, on the preservation of local biodiversity. Bristol Museum & Art Gallery joined a global coalition (United for #Biodiversity) to raise awareness about the protection of biodiversity and launched its exhibit Extinction Voices which aimed to highlight the threat of wildlife extinction and gather ideas for collective action. Another aspect of museums role in the culture of sustainability is getting their visitors to engage in climate change and sustainability issues more widely.

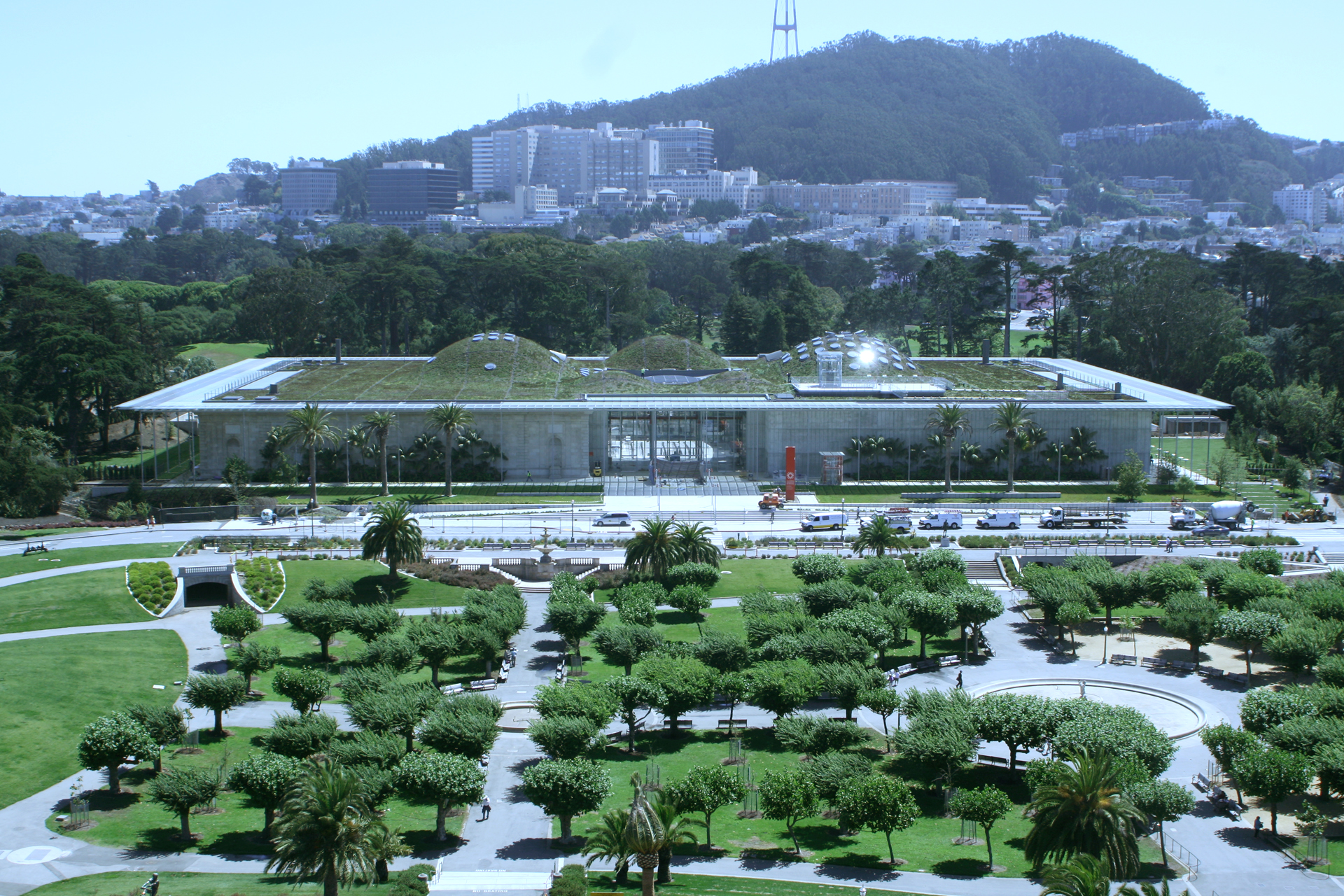
The California Academy of Sciences uses native plantings on its green roof to reduce heating and cooling energy requirements and contains many other energy and water saving features. It has been widely recognized as likely the "greenest" building currently on the planet.

== History ==
Discussions within museums about environmental sustainability began in the 1990s and have continued to grow. Green museums are receiving a lot of attention from academia and the mass media. Some scholars believe that a focus on sustainability is a way for museums to be relevant in the 21st century. However, most conventional museums are not engaged in sustainable practices.

The green museum movement began in science and children's museums. Science museums found that environmental advocacy and education fit easily within their missions and programming. Children's museums saw that using green design in their inside environments created a healthy playground for their young visitors. Once sustainability became a topic of discussion in museum circles, zoos and aquariums realized that their existing missions and programming of species conservation was in essence sustainable education. Recently, the Association of Zoos and Aquariums revised its accreditation standards to include a requirement of environmental advocacy.

With the green museum movement beginning in children's museums, The Children's Discovery Museum in Normal, Illinois, became the first LEED certified children's museum on October 3, 2005, when it received a Silver certification. The Wild Center in Tupper Lake, NY became the first LEED certified green museum in 2008, followed by The Brooklyn Children's Museum, who achieved the LEED Silver certification in 2010. In addition, this museum used rapidly renewable and recycled features such as bamboo and recycled rubber flooring to construct the building as well as used photovoltaics to generate electricity. Other good examples of green museums include The Boston Children's Museum who earned a LEED Gold certification in 2007, and Pittsburgh Children's Museum, who received a LEED Silver certification in 2006.

Science museums and zoos were quick to follow children's museums in the green movement. One of the first science museums to adopt green initiatives was ECHO, Leahy Center for Lake Champlain in Burlington, Vermont, which was the first LEED certified building in Vermont. The Natural History Museum of Utah is another museum that has taken charge in the green museum movement. The Rio Tinto Center of the museum has been certified with a Gold LEED Certificate.

Zoos and botanical gardens have also become leaders in the green museum field. The Denver Zoo, Woodland Park Zoo, and Cincinnati Zoo all received Green Awards at the 2011 Association of Zoos and Aquariums conference. The Phipps Conservatory & Botanical Gardens was given a LEED silver certification for its new Welcome Center, which "is designed to evoke the geometry of the historic glass houses behind it." It has 11,000 square feet of lobby, ticketing, gift shop, and cafe space with a 34 ft high glass dome that is insulated to control glare and heat. Architects partially built the structure into the terrain, with 14th feet of usable space below ground. It was determined that by doing this, Phipps would save 40-50% of annual energy costs compared with an entirely above ground structure, and demonstrated that sustainable design could be created in ways that were still sympathetic to historic settings. Phipps will also be opening the Center for Sustainable Landscapes, which will house a center for education, research, and administration. It is scheduled to open in the spring of 2012, and is planned to exceed the LEED platinum certification, and achieve the Living Building Challenge.

Art museums are now also joining the movement. The Grand Rapids Art Museum became the world's first LEED certified art museum complex in 2008 when it received LEED Gold certification, with such innovative features as a heat recovery ventilator, CO_{2} sensors, and on site grey water reuse.

One specific example of a green museum is The Toledo Zoo in Toledo, Ohio. In 2007, the institution redefined its mission statement to focus on informing the public about conservation. As part of its mission, the Toledo Zoo committed to green construction, which was shown in the parking lot renovation project. The main parking lot was redesigned in order to increase parking capacity and aid traffic flow, and the project incorporated green elements such as rain gardens and reusing concrete. The renovation also included a residential-sized wind turbine and three solar panels to power the ticket booths at the park's entrance. The wind-turbine and solar panels generate 3600 kilowatt hours per year, which can be redirected into the zoo's main power grid when the booths are not in use and reduce the zoo's carbon footprint by 5600 pounds annually.

Another project at the Toledo Zoo is the Solar Walk, which opened in November 2010 and includes over 1400 solar panels that produce 104,000 kilowatt hours per year, the same amount of energy used by ten typical homes in Ohio. The Toledo Zoo and the Solar Walk's design team wanted the project to be a visual reminder to all zoo visitors and traffic from nearby highway of the zoo's commitment to conservation. In order to accomplish the project, the Toledo Zoo turned to a local companies, and used funds from private contributions and an energy grant from ODOD to cover the $14,750,000 price. Also, The Toledo Zoo, in keeping with their mission statement, included informational panels on how the Solar Walk works and the amount of energy produced to date, so that visitors can be informed on the conservational value of the project. The Solar Walk will reduce the Zoo's carbon footprint by over 75 metric tons each year, which is equivalent to 15 medium-sized cars. The Toledo Zoo has further committed to incorporate green construction into its building plans through geothermal wells, environmentally friendly insulation and other renewable energy and green construction materials.

== Green exhibits ==
Museums are taking a more active approach to the project development of their exhibits. Children's museums initiated the green museum movement, mainly out of health concerns for the young visitors. Using toxic materials and chemicals on structures intended for children became a high worry for both the museum staff and parents. "In its 2004 expansion project the Children's Museum of Pittsburgh used only adhesives, sealants, paints, carpets, and composite wood that are certified formaldehyde free with near-zero off-gassing."

Before the reduce, reuse, recycle mantra became mainstream, a small number of museums had already begun promoting sustainable decision making through exhibits. The Boston Children's Museum, developed a concept known as "The Recycle Shop".

Organizations are working to develop a standard rating system for the specific needs of green exhibitions. In 2008, the Oregon Museum of Science and Industry (OMSI) developed the OMSI Green Exhibit Certification guide to assist museums in assessing the environmental sustainability of their exhibits, and to help develop more sustainable forward plans. Based on the U.S. Green Building Council (USGBC) Leadership in Energy and Environmental Design (LEED) rating system, the OMSI Green Exhibition Certification guide simplified and adapted the LEED system to cater to the specific needs of the museum sector, especially in view of the limited financial and human resources found in many museums.

The guide provides a checklist for organizations who follows eight elements regularly used in exhibit design. After evaluation, they are awarded 0-4 points:

1. Rapidly Renewable Materials
2. Resource Reuse
3. Recycled Content
4. End-life Assessment
5. Low-Emitting Materials
6. Certified wood
7. Conservation
8. Regional Materials

Through the project, Sustainability: Promoting Sustainable Decision Making in Informal Education, funded by the National Science Foundation (NSF), OMSI also developed Exhibit Social Environmental and Economic Development (Exhibit SEED) in collaboration with multidisciplinary professionals across the United States. Exhibit SEED is a toolkit designed to help museums create holistically sustainable museum exhibits. The guide is based on "Three Pillars of Sustainability for Museums," considerations based on environmental sustainability, economic sustainability, and social sustainability, and provides multiple examples of how a museum might reasonably adjust their practices to incorporate these pillars. Many museums across the globe has since developed and shared their own guidelines for sustainability in museums. The Madison Children's Museum in Madison, WI developed their own "green guide" for sustainable museum practice; their green initiatives in sustainable materials, community outreach, and museum programming led them to become the first Wisconsin museum to receive LEED certification.

== Issues ==
=== Mission ===
Some scholars suggest that sustainability and green design are a natural extension of a museum's mission statement. Some museums choose to make sustainability a central part of their identity, writing their commitment to being green in their mission statements. Sustainability can be seen as relating to three aspects included in most museum missions: field of research, purpose of public service, and the mandate for education. Museums that model green behavior enhance their missions and support their communities.

=== Education ===
As informal education centers that serve the public, museums are in a position to teach about sustainability to a large audience in meaningful ways. Through a combination of motivation and information, green museums try to initiate changes in behavior in people's everyday lives. Green museums lead by example by explaining to visitors what sustainable activities they are doing and why through signage, programming, and websites. The goal is that visitors will learn about sustainable practices at the museum and then be able to implement them at home.

Many museums dedicated to sustainability and conservation education often utilize the works of theorists like Richard Louv and David Sobel to find the most effective ways to motivate their audiences to conservation action. For instance, Disney's Animal Kingdom cites Richard Louv's Nature Deficit Disorder as one justification for their Kids' Discovery Clubs, which focuses on encouraging children to not only learn about animals but also find out what they can do to help wildlife. Another museum to cite Louv's Nature Deficit Disorder for their programming is the North Carolina Museum of Natural Sciences. They spearheaded the national Take a Child Outside Week, which encourages children and adults to spend time together outdoors. Many museums also approach sustainability issues with Ecophobia in mind. Ecophobia is David Sobel's theory that if you introduce abstract and difficult environmental issues to children at too early of an age, and without the proper background knowledge, they will retreat from nature. An example of a museum attempting to overcome Ecophobia would be one that promotes a love of nature and presents a variety of actions guests can take to help the environment before presenting them with more controversial and abstract environmental and sustainability issues. The Brooklyn Children's Museums respects the developmental stages of children by using their LEED certified building to teach children and their families about environmental conservation through interactive, age appropriate exhibits and activities.

=== Social responsibility ===
In recent years, calls for museums to become sustainable institutions have come from within the museum field as a way for museums to achieve social responsibility and civic engagement. Sustainability is an opportunity for thoughtful, proactive museum work. "Museums can play a critical role in moving the communities they serve towards a more sustainable future. Aligning their missions and programs with sustainability principles ... will recalibrate their own daily practices as well as awaken their community to the array of choices perhaps otherwise invisible to them" (183).

Museums, as a trusted part of the informal education system, are able to address the economic, cultural, and social dimensions of sustainability. They achieve this by engaging the public with interactive exhibits and by publicizing their own green efforts. The goal, stated or unstated, is to educate patrons about the effect they have on their environment, the ecological, economic, and cultural risks taken when they ignore their impact on the world, and introduce ways that they can reduce their carbon footprint. Thus, museums achieve civic engagement and social responsibility through teaching.

Some museums, such as the Royal Saskatchewan Museum in Saskatchewan, Canada, take a global approach to civic engagement. The Royal Saskatchewan Museum's green exhibit is titled The Human Factor and aims to show patrons the human ecological impact on the planet, what practices they can adopt to lessen this impact, and project what the future will be if humans do not take action. Visitors are helped to understand what Earth looked like before humans and gradual human impact over time through colorful depictions in the "Time Tunnel". The subsequent gallery, "Living Planet", explains how a global ecosystem functions and what human stresses are to the Earth's global ecosystem on a rotating globe. Specifically identified as a stress to the global ecosystem is the rising population. Curators placed clocks in the exhibit that count increases in population across the globe. Beneath the clocks are the forms of humans and in their shadow is the images of industrial productivity. The following gallery, "Causes of Stress," identifies the source of ecological stresses as rampant consumerism and explains what causes this extreme behavior. The solutions gallery depicts sustainable development and an electronic display of sustainability success stories. This is an effort to show patrons how their choices impact not only themselves and their parts of the world but other people and their environments. The last gallery, "Looking Ahead," describes the projected future of the globe if humans adopt the prescribed changes. The desired effect is an emotional response to the human impact on the global ecosystem.

The Bronx Zoo seeks to educate its patrons about water resources and the impact of restroom use on water resources through the EcoRestroom exhibit. At the same time, by installing this restroom with composting toilets the Zoo has reduced its carbon footprint. The restroom serves men and women with 12 toilets and six sinks for women and two toilets, four waterless urinals and four sinks for men. The sinks do not rely on electricity or battery power; rather, they recharge as water runs through them. The used water runs into a Grey Water garden that is unharmed by the bio-compatible soap available for use by patrons. The restroom doubles as exhibition space, informing visitors of water conservation. Along the pathway to the entrance of the restroom there are water-droplet-shaped signs that give visitors tips for conserving and repurposing water at home. Signs continue over the sinks, providing visitors with facts about water use meant to inspire thought about their own use and what they can do to use less water. Signs on the inside of the stall doors inform visitors how composting toilets function and the impact they have on the environment. This installation not only shows patrons how they can make simple changes to conserve water but implements those changes in real time at the Zoo. In educating, the Zoo is also making a difference.

As stewards of the public trust, museums bear a responsibility to maintain collections utilizing the most efficient methods available. Museums must do their part to ensure that there is a public to enjoy the collection and resources to exhibit the collection. One way museums can conserve resources is to incorporate energy saving practices into their daily operations, altering the facilities they already inhabit rather than building anew. Brophy and Wylie identify simple solutions such as installing motion sensors that turn the lights on when visitors enter the gallery and turn the lights off when they exit, such as those found at Colonial Williamsburg in Virginia. Those light bulbs could even be replaced with long-lasting LED bulbs. Other museums that manipulate their facilities location include the Morgan Library, as identified by Brophy and Wylie, whose storage is "carved out of Manhattan bedrock." The bedrock provides natural cool storage without using electricity to generate an air conditioned climate. Thus neither money nor electricity are spent to control the climate of the storage space, which stresses not only museum funds but increasingly scarce electricity too.

Museums achieve further social responsibility through implementation of sustainable practices that they advocate in building or altering facilities such that they are sustainable. This includes using LEED building practices and sourcing materials locally. Purchasing building materials and employing local labor stimulates the economy in the vicinity of the museum. It also reduces the carbon footprint of construction; materials purchased from local suppliers do not need to be delivered on a tractor-trailer, on an airplane, or on a ship, all of which consume fuel, time and money. The Museum of Contemporary Art in Denver, CO, has incorporated locally sourcing materials into its LEED-Gold design plan. The Museum highlights that its green roof, furniture fixtures and equipment have all been locally sourced. The museum also encourages the use of public transportation by offering discounts to visitors who use this as a means of accessing the museum. In building to the LEED Gold standard, the Museum of Contemporary Art has also made its operations more energy efficient. The façade is built to maximize climate control and limit the use of traditional forced air. Radiant flooring circulates heat around the perimeter of the building. These are two ways that MCA Denver conserves energy. The Museum of Contemporary Art San Diego purchased paint, office furnishings, windows and doors from local vendors. By educating the community and putting advocacy into action, museums become socially responsible.

== Landscapes and outdoor spaces ==
One approach green museums are taking to improve sustainability is to consider their outdoor spaces and landscape design. Greening outdoor spaces provides multiple benefits beyond aesthetics and museums are increasingly using their outdoor spaces to further sustainable strategies and educational goals. According to the National Clearinghouse for Educational Facilities, there are many types of educational, recreational, and social skills that may be successfully taught outdoors. Outdoor museum spaces include pathways, trails, pavilions, picnic areas, fountains, courtyards, waste management areas, rooftops, and the greater surrounding environment. Whether a new facility or an existing one, green museums use these outdoor areas to implement sustainable practices. For instance, incorporating native plants, wetlands, bioswales, rain gardens, butterfly gardens, vegetable gardens, and green roofs are all ways museums can maximize the use of, and green their grounds. Additionally, the natural surrounding environment can be an integral part of the green museum (where the land is part of the museum). Incorporating these outdoor spaces provides a more flexible learning environment with greater educational opportunities. Outdoor spaces allow for hands-on projects that promote environmental awareness and are an ideal catalyst for community involvement.

Increasingly, green museums are incorporating sustainable thinking in their outdoor planning. For example, the Peggy Notebaert Nature Museum designed a rooftop that won the 2003 Chicago Green Roof Award. The living portion of the roof reduces the volume of storm water runoff and solar panels generate electricity used by the museum below.

The ability to quantify the performance of outdoor spaces is important to be a trusted example in the green museum community. There are multiple rating systems and interactive tools online and there is a growing consultancy field aimed at helping museums audit, develop baselines, and benchmark their performance. One strategy for museums going green is to become LEED Certificated. In 2000, the US Green Building Council (USGBC) introduced the Leadership in Energy and Environmental Design (LEED) rating system that ranks sustainability in buildings and operations. To date, LEED is focused mostly on structures and development, while landscape issues are minimally addressed. The Sustainable SITES Initiative (SITES) is a new benchmark and rating system that was created, as a joint venture by the American Society of Landscape Architects, the Lady Bird Johnson Wildflower Center and the United States Botanic Garden. Modeled after the LEED program, SITES is a work in progress to establish benchmarks and a rating system that addresses site selection, landscape design, construction, operations, maintenance and monitoring. Currently SITES is in the pilot project phase, and will be completed in June 2012.

== Greening the field of preventive conservation ==
The needs of conserving artifacts and landmark buildings are often seen as conflicting with the most efficient and effective means of “going green.” Light, temperature, humidity, pollutants, particulates, and pests must all be monitored in order to properly preserve objects and historic buildings - the energy spent to control and maintain ideal environments for historic building and artifacts alone is staggering. Since the heart of authenticity for many types of museums is the display of artifacts and specimens from their collections, it can be challenging to create ideal environments for these objects while also creating greener museum buildings and exhibition spaces. For example, the California Academy of Sciences, which is housed in a LEED Platinum building designed by Renzo Piano, utilizes a natural ventilation system that could expose its collections to airborne flora and fauna, fluctuations in temperature and humidity, and strong daylight. In order to combat these factors, Jonathan Katz, CEO of Cinnabar, Inc., the firm that was hired by the California Academy of Sciences to design exhibits for the main floor of its new Natural History building, devised a “kit of parts” system where specimen display cases themselves could be configured to control temperature, humidity, and light. These cases had to reflect the sustainability mission of the museum and thus had to be built in such a way that they could be reconfigured and reused as exhibits changed. This is simply one example of how the perceived conflict between green exhibition and building design and the preservation of objects was resolved.

The struggle to reconcile green practices and object conservation goes far beyond the exhibition hall, as most museums only display a fraction of the objects in their collections. Museum conservators are tasked with the care, preservation, and restoration of these objects – the American Institute for Preservation, a professional organization in the United States that establishes and upholds professional standards among its members, states that the goal of its conservators is “to preserve the material evidence of our past so we can learn from it today and appreciate it in the future.” In striving to be “greener,” conservators must also now “consider not only the interaction of materials and environment with the art and artifacts [they] treat, but also the use, production, and disposal of the materials [they] employ in [their] work.” Thus, another problem facing conservators is the issue of finding non-toxic or lower VOC replacements for tried and true conservation treatments. In order to fully understand the challenges associated with green conservation practices, then, it is helpful to examine what conservation professionals identify as core issues. Patricia Silence, in “How Are US Conservators Going Green? Results of Polling AIC Members” identifies five areas pertaining to sustainable practices: recycling, energy consumption, waste, improved sustainability through products and procedures, and education. The following list was composed based on findings from Silence's paper:

Recycling

- Reusable materials (rags, sponges, brushes)
- Less paper (digital archives)
- Saving scrap (for later use)

Energy Consumption

- Temperature Control (radiant heating systems)
- RH Control (finding creative and pragmatic solutions to display and storage of objects)
- Light Control (Using more energy efficient lighting schemes to illuminate museum objects, )
- Using renewable energy to power environmental systems
- Using more energy-efficient environmental systems

Waste

- Use less energy (environmental controls and office appliances) and materials (wood, paper, plastic, foam)
- Try to reuse or recycle a greater proportion of used items
- Proper disposal training for toxic items

Improved Sustainability through Products and Procedures

- Less toxic chemicals and solvents
- Water-based cleaning systems and/or natural products
- Organic cotton rags and towels
- Recycled or re-purposed products
- Used equipment, furniture, tools
- Less toxic packing materials
- Less toxic pest management chemicals
- Re-distilling
- Procedures for proper disposal
- Procedures for testing new materials

Education

- Best Practices Manual
- Resource List
