= Brooklyn Community Board 8 =

Brooklyn Community District 8
- Community District
- Country: United States
- State: New York
- City: New York City
- Borough: Brooklyn
- Neighborhoods: List: Crown Heights; Prospect Heights

Government
  - Chairperson: Irsa Weatherspoon
  - District Manager: Michelle George

Area
  - Total: 1.6 sq mi (4.1 km^{2})

Population (2020)
  - Total: 108,259 ▲
  - Density: 68,000/sq mi (26,000/km^{2})

Ethnicity
  - Black: 45.9%
  - White: 28.7%
  - Hispanic and Latino (any race): 13.1%
  - Asian: 5.0%
  - Others: 7.3%
- Time zone: UTC−5 (Eastern)
  - Summer (DST): UTC−4 (EDT)
- ZIP codes: 11213, 11216, 11233, 11238, and 11225
- Area code: 718, 347, 929, and 917
- Police Precincts: 77th (website); 78th (website)
- Website: www.brooklyncb8.org

Brooklyn Community Board 8 is a New York City community board that encompasses the Brooklyn neighborhoods of Crown Heights, Prospect Heights, and Weeksville. It is delimited by Flatbush Avenue on the west, Atlantic Avenue on the north, Ralph Avenue on the east, and Eastern Parkway on the south.

Its current Chairperson is Irsa Weatherspoon, Robert Matthews is Chair Emeritus, and its District Manager is Michelle George.

== Demographics ==
Historical population
Census	Pop.	Note	%±
1990	96,878		—
2000	95,953		−1.0%
2010	96,317		0.4%
2020	108,259		12.4%
U.S. Decennial Census

Brooklyn Community Board 1 recorded a population of 108,259 in the 2020 United States census, a 12% increase since the 2010 United States census, when the figure stood at 96,317.

Population by race as of 2010 and 2020 censuses:
Race	2010		2020	
Black	63,111	65.52%	49,705	45.91%
White	16,056	16.67%	31,077	28.71%
Asian	2,712	2.82%	5,451	5.03%
Other	636	0.66%	1,467	1.35%
Multiracial	2,304	2.39%	6,428	5.94%
Hispanic (any race)	11,498	11.94%	14,131	13.05%
Total	96,317	100%	108,259	100%
