= Harold Kushner =

American rabbi (1935–2023)

Harold Samuel Kushner
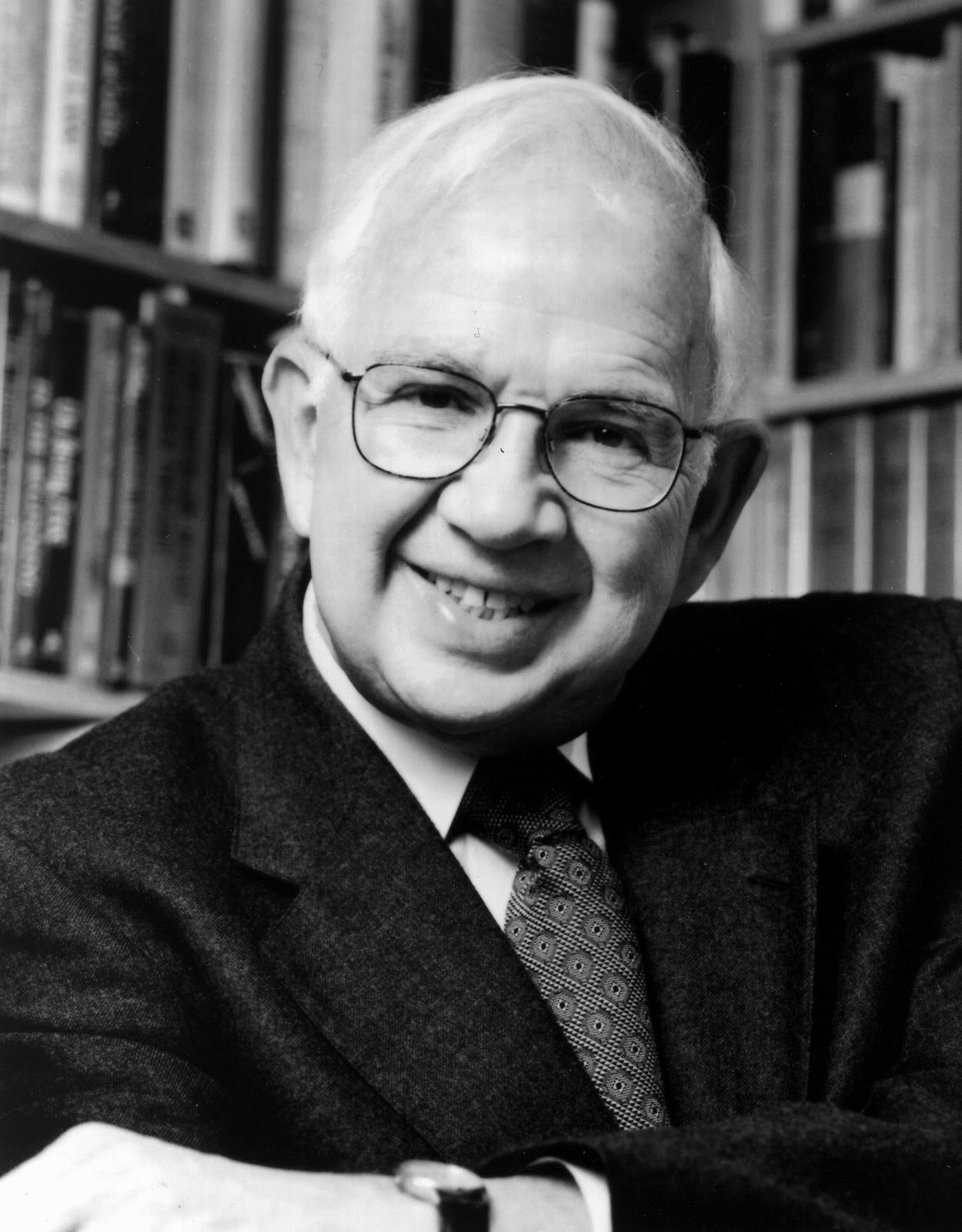
- Born: April 3, 1935; New York City, U.S.
- Died: April 28, 2023 (aged 88); Canton, Massachusetts, U.S.
- Education: Columbia University
- Occupations: Rabbi; author
- Notable work: When Bad Things Happen to Good People; When All You've Ever Wanted Isn't Enough

Harold Samuel Kushner (April 3, 1935 – April 28, 2023) was an American rabbi, author, and lecturer. He was a member of the Rabbinical Assembly of Conservative Judaism and served as the congregational rabbi of Temple Israel of Natick, in Natick, Massachusetts, for 24 years.

Kushner gained widespread recognition for his many popular books that simplify complex theological ideas for both Jewish and non-Jewish readers. He received numerous awards, including the Christopher Award in 1987 and the Jewish Book Council's Lifetime Achievement Award in 2007. His most prominent works include When Bad Things Happen to Good People, delving into human suffering, divine kindness, and theodicy following his son's death from progeria, and When All You've Ever Wanted Isn't Enough, exploring existential themes of life's purpose and the pursuit of fulfillment.

Considered to have been one of America's most prominent rabbis, Kushner was known for his Reconstructionist views and for his ideological progressiveness within the Conservative movement. He argued against the notion of an omnipotent, interventionist God, and instead focused on God's role in offering comfort and solace to those who suffer.

== Early life and education ==
Harold Samuel Kushner was born to Conservative Jewish parents Julius and Sarah (née Hartman) Kushner in Brooklyn, New York City. When he began elementary school, his family relocated to the Crown Heights neighborhood. Kushner was an avid fan of the Brooklyn Dodgers in his early years. While his mother was a homemaker, his father owned Playmore Publishing, a shop at Fifth Avenue and 23rd Street that specialized in selling children's books and toys, primarily Bible stories. Julius had hoped that his son would take over the business someday, but Harold did not believe he possessed the same level of business acumen as his father.

After graduating from Erasmus Hall High School, he attended Columbia University, where he initially intended to major in psychology but later switched to literature after being taught by Mark Van Doren, a Pulitzer Prize-winning poet. At Columbia, Kushner's extracurricular positions included working for Jester of Columbia and WKCR, where he eventually became the director of sports broadcasting, and serving as the president of the student Zionist organization.

Despite having a strong religious upbringing, Kushner had no plans to become a rabbi until he joined an evening program at the Jewish Theological Seminary in New York City. He became certain about his calling to be a rabbi during his junior year at Columbia. He completed his bachelor's degree in religious education in 1955, and after completing his master's degree in the social and philosophical foundations of education in 1960, he enrolled full-time at the seminary, where he was ordained that same year. Kushner received his doctorate in Hebrew literature in 1972. He also completed a year of graduate work at the Hebrew University of Jerusalem and held teaching positions at Clark University and the Rabbinical School of the JTS.

== Rabbinical career ==
Following his rabbinic ordination, Kushner went to court to request the waiver of his military exemption. He served for two years as a first lieutenant in the Army's Chaplain Corps at Fort Sill in Oklahoma. After his discharge from the military, Kushner returned to New York and served as an assistant rabbi at Temple Israel in Great Neck from 1962 to 1966.

In 1966, Kushner assumed the position of rabbi at the 450-family congregation Temple Israel in Natick, Massachusetts. He fulfilled the role of congregational rabbi there for 24 years while also being a member of the Rabbinical Assembly, the "clerical arm" of the Conservative movement. From 1972 to 1974, he served as the president of the New England Region of the Rabbinical Assembly. Initially serving as Temple Israel's full-time rabbi, he shifted to part-time in 1983 to allocate more time for writing and in 1990, he transitioned to full-time writing and lecturing. The synagogue deemed Kushner, who was 55 years old at the time, too young to be appointed as rabbi emeritus, so he was bestowed the title of rabbi laureate in 1983. The title, held by only a few American rabbis, underlined his commitment to maintaining an enduring connection with both his congregants and the rabbinate. He attended the synagogue until his death.

Kushner's presence in the Conservative movement was described as "inescapable". In 2001, he co-authored Etz Hayim: A Torah Commentary, the new official Torah commentary of the Conservative movement, in collaboration with Chaim Potok. The comprehensive work comprises four layers of commentary, encompassing insights on Conservative observance of Jewish law and traditional and contemporary interpretations of scripture (midrash), curated by Kushner.

Kushner spoke at the interfaith prayer service for the second inauguration of Bill Clinton. He was also a eulogist at the state funeral of Ronald Reagan in the Washington National Cathedral in 2004, where he offered a reading from the Book of Isaiah.

== Writing ==
With the backing of Rabbi Ira Eisenstein, the founder of the Reconstructionist Rabbinical College, Kushner released his inaugural book in 1971 under the title When Children Ask About God: A Guide for Parents Who Don't Always Have All the Answers. Rather than reinforcing the notion of God as an all-knowing and all-powerful creator, he aimed to foster a healthy skepticism and encourage questioning as a means of developing a meaningful religious faith. The book primarily targeted parents and aimed to address the concerns of people who were seeking a new Jewish belief system more in line with their broader worldview.

Kushner is best known for his international best-selling book on the problem of evil, When Bad Things Happen to Good People, published in 1981. Written following the death of his son, Aaron, from the premature aging disease progeria, it deals with questions about human suffering, God, omnipotence, and theodicy. Kushner aimed to assist individuals in maintaining their belief in God's benevolence despite experiencing personal tragedies. His book offers a fresh interpretation of the Book of Job, suggesting that while God may not have the power to prevent suffering, God provides solace to those who are afflicted. His contemporary interpretation of theodicy in the book laid the groundwork for the modernist theological literature within the Conservative Jewish community, alongside works by Elliott N. Dorff, Neil Gillman, Harold M. Schulweis, and David Wolpe. The book resonated with readers across religions and was translated into at least 12 languages. Its success propelled it to the top of The New York Times Best Seller list, and established Kushner as a well-known author and commentator. In 1991, it tied for the ninth position with four other books in the Book of the Month Club's list of the top ten books that had the most significant impact on American lives, based on a nationwide survey. The book was described as "arguably one of the most widely read books written by a rabbi in centuries" and as "one of the most widely read Jewish books of our generation" by Neil Gillman. Its popularity was partly attributed to Protestant clergy members promoting it in their sermons and distributing copies to their congregations. Four million copies had been sold by the book's 20th anniversary.

In 1986, Kushner published When All You've Ever Wanted Isn't Enough: The Search for a Life That Matters, delving into existential themes of life's meaning and individual pursuit of happiness within the context of Ecclesiastes. Its title was deemed an "apt summary of Ecclesiastes". Kushner's goal was to dissect the unfulfillment experienced even by achievers, asserting that "What we miss in our lives, no matter how much we have, is that sense of meaning." He rejected the notion of a singular answer to life's complexities and contended that such answers are found in daily experiences, relationships, and the quest for integrity. Central to his argument was Ecclesiastes, which he called "the most dangerous book in the Bible" for its call to contemplation over blind worship, as Kushner contended that life's richness emerges from thoughtful engagement, emphasizing that an unfulfilled life is more daunting than death itself. The book earned praise as a "useful spiritual survival manual" from The Washington Post and received the 1987 Christopher Award for its "contribution to the exaltation of the human spirit."

Who Needs God, published in 1989, argued for the ongoing relevance of God in a world characterized by unprecedented human achievements. As with Kushner's previous works, Reconstructionist views were apparent in his attempt to make room for religious life and the notion of God without the belief in an all-powerful creator. He aimed to bridge the gap between religious fundamentalism and atheism, highlighting that organized religion's greatest offering is not theology but rather the comfort and support of a spiritual community. Kushner also asserted that the existence of God endows individuals with the ability to perceive holiness in the world and attain a greater sense of purpose.

Kushner authored several other well-received theological books, such as How Good Do We Have to Be? and To Life!. Works such as When All You've Ever Wanted Isn't Enough, Who Needs God? and How Good Do We Have to Be? reached a wide readership of millions. In 2007, Kushner received a Lifetime Achievement Award from the Jewish Book Council.

Carolyn Hessel, director of the Jewish Book Council, attributed Kushner's success to his ability to appeal to everyone regardless of their background. Burton Cooper, a professor of theology at the Louisville Presbyterian Theological Seminary, argues that Kushner's popularity and significance arise from his skill in reaching individuals with a "modern consciousness", a perspective informed by science, and resonating with their longing for religious faith.

In the fall of 2001, Kushner achieved his sixth best-seller with Living a Life That Matters, focused on Jacob from the Old Testament, the sole figure with a complete biography in the Bible. He examines Jacob's complex moral choices, such as deceiving his father to secure his blessing. He interprets Jacob's encounter with an angel as an internal struggle, symbolizing the conflict within his soul and his progression towards integrity. While Kushner's stance suggests Jacob's victory through loss, the Torah presents an alternate perspective, depicting Jacob as the undisputed winner.

Kushner's response to Simon Wiesenthal's question of forgiveness was included in a revised 1997 edition of the book The Sunflower: On the Possibilities and Limits of Forgiveness, alongside those of 45 other leading intellectuals and commentators. Wiesenthal's inquiry emerged from a real-life scenario during the Holocaust, when he confronted a dying Nazi soldier who sought absolution for his heinous deeds, prompting the question: Can such profound wrongdoing be forgiven? Kushner conveyed the essence of forgiveness as follows:

Forgiving is not something we do for another person, as the Nazi asked Wiesenthal to do for him. Forgiving happens inside us. It represents a letting go of the sense of grievance, and perhaps most importantly a letting go of the role of victim. For a Jew to forgive the Nazis would not mean, God forbid, saying to them "What you did was understandable, I can understand what led you to it and I don't hate you for it." It would mean saying "What you did was thoroughly despicable and puts you outside the category of decent human beings. But I refuse to give you the power to define me as a victim. I refuse to let your blind hatred define the shape and content of my Jewishness. I don't hate you; I reject you." And then the Nazi would remained chained to his past and to his conscience, but the Jew would be free.

Kushner was an editor of the journal Conservative Judaism from 1980 to 1984.

Kushner frequently used examples from TV shows and movies in his teachings and writings to connect with his audience, as he believed many people are more familiar with these cultural references than with the Bible, although he expressed concern over the semi-literacy of the Bible and found it surprising when people were not familiar with biblical stories.

== Views ==
Kushner, affiliated with Conservative Judaism, championed progressive concepts within the movement while deeply influenced by Mordecai Kaplan, his teacher and the founder of Reconstructionist Judaism, whom he regarded as the most influential thinker in American Jewish history. During a speech to the Rabbinical Assembly in 1980, he commented that the Conservative movement had faced an ongoing crisis regarding the authority of halakhah (Jewish law) since its inception. He emphasized that the goal of Conservative rabbis was to demonstrate that leading a religious life in the modern era could be fulfilling, without imposing strict observance on less practicing Jews. Paraphrasing Jewish theologian Martin Buber, Kushner also once stated that "people want less theology and more religion." He rejected the definition of religion "as an individual experience", emphasizing its communal aspect.

Informed by the teachings of Kaplan, Kushner was a proponent of Jewish religious naturalism. Discarding the notion of an omnipotent God, he proposed that God lacks complete dominion over the universe and is not culpable for evil. Within this Reconstructionist framework, he identified two core life forces: the randomness of nature and purposeful divine actions. He rejected the notion of God causing suffering as punishment, advocating instead for a God who shares in human pain, as evidenced by God's name "I am with you" in the Book of Exodus. Viewing God as a source of empathy and love, Kushner once recalled being concerned that during Yom Kippur, his synagogue's congregants focused too much on guilt and did not give themselves the chance to experience God's forgiveness. His aphorism "forgiveness benefits us more than the person we forgive" was one of many adopted by religious leaders of various faiths. Drawing from the Reconstructionist tradition, Kushner asserted that God shouldn't be perceived as a distant entity in space, emphasizing that the question of God's existence doesn't necessarily revolve around the concept of a heavenly population.

Kushner's writing and ideas were popular among Christians, but traditional Jews held mixed opinions. He once expressed, "I always thought Judaism was at its best when it not only looked at text, but when it looked at people." Kushner's approach, rooted in a focus on human needs, occasionally led him to reinterpret Jewish theology for emotional solace. This resulted in some Orthodox Jews feeling defensive of traditional Jewish teachings and accusing him of promoting un-Jewish ideas. In When Bad Things Happen to Good People, Kushner reconciled Jewish beliefs in God's omnipotence and benevolence constraining God's influence over random hazards in life. He likened God to a benevolent watchmaker who created the world and its natural laws. This perspective portrays God as taking pride in his creation while permitting it to operate within these established laws, including the occurrence of random challenges. This implies that God intentionally refrains from complete control over every aspect of life, enabling individuals to navigate and respond to various situations while supporting them only with his presence. This view contradicts traditional Jewish teaching and led to criticism from Orthodox Jews, although Kushner himself acknowledged that he may have been wrong about God. Literary critic and journalist Ron Rosenbaum was not convinced by Kushner's argument in the book, describing Kushner's position as "diminishing God to something less than an Omnipotent Being – to something more like an eager cheerleader for good, but one decidedly on the sidelines in the struggle against evil."

In line with Kaplan's influence and Reconstructionist theology, Kushner perceived the Torah as a fully human creation that, while acknowledging its human origins, serves to commemorate significant religious experiences in life. He sometimes expressed doubt about the reliability of individuals who claim to have heard divine messages, and cited the Binding of Isaac as a problematic narrative that contradicts fundamental religious tenets. The story tells of Abraham going to sacrifice his son, Isaac, as an offering to God in obedience to a divine directive. Although Kushner believed that Abraham heard the message, he was skeptical that God actually said it.

== Personal life ==
In 1960, Kushner married Suzette Estrada and moved to Massachusetts. Estrada died in 2022. The couple had a son named Aaron, who died of progeria at the age of 14, a daughter named Ariel, and two grandchildren. Kushner's brother Paul was a rabbi in Bellmore and Merrick on Long Island, and died in 2019.

In 1995, Christian inspirational group the Christophers included Kushner in their list of "50 individuals who have made a positive impact on the world over the past 50 years." He was the recipient of six honorary doctorates.

Kushner moved into a senior residence in Canton, Massachusetts in 2017. He died on April 28, 2023, at age 88.

== Bibliography ==
- When Children Ask About God. Reconstructionist Press. 1971. ISBN 978-0805208795.
- When Bad Things Happen to Good People. Schocken Books. 1981. ISBN 978-1400034727.
- When All You've Ever Wanted Isn't Enough: The Search for a Life That Matters. Summit Books. 1986. ISBN 978-0446670029.
- Who Needs God. Summit Books. 1989. ISBN 978-0743234771.
- To Life: A Celebration of Jewish Being and Thinking. Little Brown and Company. 1993. ISBN 978-0446670029.
- When Children Ask About God: A Guide for Parents Who Don't Always Have All the Answers. Knopf Doubleday Publishing Group. 1995. ISBN 978-0805210330.
- How Good Do We Have to Be? A New Understanding of Guilt and Forgiveness. Little Brown and Company. 1996. ISBN 978-0316507417.
- Living a Life That Matters: Resolving the Conflict Between Conscience and Success. Knopf Doubleday Publishing Group. 1996. ISBN 978-1447206392.
- The Lord Is My Shepherd: Healing Wisdom of the 23rd Psalm. Anchor Books. 2003. ISBN 978-1400033355.
- Overcoming Life's Disappointments. Anchor Books. ISBN 978-0739326503.
- Practice Random Acts of Kindness: Bring More Peace, Love, And Compassion. Conari Press. 2007. ISBN 978-1573242721.
- Faith & Family: Favorite Sermons of Rabbi Harold S. Kushner. self-published. 2007. ISBN 978-0979884306.
- Conquering Fear: Living Boldly in an Uncertain World. Knopf Doubleday Publishing Group. 2009. ISBN 978-0307385895.
- The Book of Job: When Bad Things Happened to a Good Person. Schocken. 2012. ISBN 978-0805243079.
- Nine Essential Things I've Learned about Life. Anchor Books. 2015. ISBN 978-0804173452.
- Echoes of Sinai. Curtis Brown Unlimited. 2018. ISBN 978-1944377298.
