= Congregation Kol Israel =

Orthodox synagogue in Brooklyn, New York

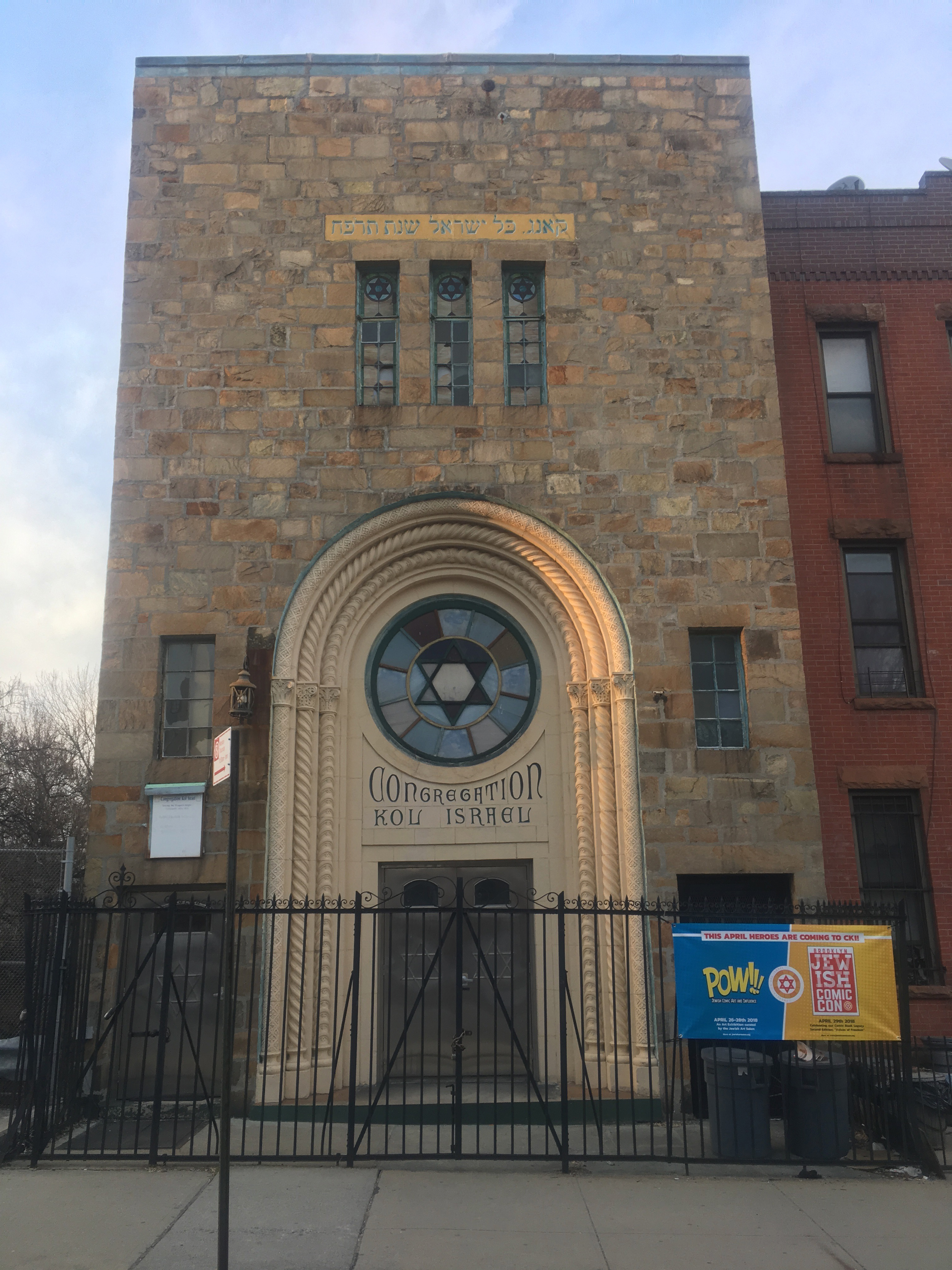
- The synagogue in 2018

- Location in New York City

Religion
- Affiliation: Modern Orthodox Judaism
- Ecclesiastical or organisational status: Synagogue
- Leadership: Rabbi Ben Keil
- Status: Active

Location
- Location: 603 St. John's Place, Brooklyn, New York City, New York 11238
- Country: United States
- Coordinates: 40°40′29″N 73°57′29″W

Architecture
- Architect: Tobias Goldstone
- Type: Synagogue architecture
- Style: Moorish Revival
- Established: 1924 (as a congregation)
- Completed: 1928
- Materials: Stone, brick

Website
- ckibrooklyn.org
- Kol Israel Synagogue
- U.S. National Register of Historic Places
- Area: Less than one acre
- NRHP reference No.: 09000966
- Added to NRHP: December 2, 2009

Congregation Kol Israel is a historic Modern Orthodox Jewish congregation and synagogue, located at 603 St. John's Place in the Crown Heights neighborhood of Brooklyn, New York City, New York, in the United States.

== History ==
The congregation was established in 1924 as an Orthodox congregation. The synagogue was built in 1928 and is a vernacular "tenement synagogue." It is a small, two story rectangular building faced in random laid fieldstone. It was designed by Brooklyn architect Tobias Goldstone. The western side of its midblock lot overlooks the open cut of the Franklin Avenue Line of the New York City Subway.

The synagogue building was listed on the National Register of Historic Places in 2009.

=== Eruv ===
In 2015, "after several failed attempts to bring in new members," the board hired Rabbi Sam Reinstein to "transform his ailing Modern Orthodox synagogue into a place young people consider cool." In addition to adding monthly art shows and after-parties to its programming, the synagogue in 2016 hosted "the first Jewish Comic Con," which featured comics artists Isaac Goodheart of Postal and Jordan B. Gorfinkel.

In June 2016, an eruv built to benefit the Kol Israel congregation "increased sixfold the area in which observant Jews can carry items, and, most importantly, push strollers during Shabbat," but was opposed by Hasidic Chabad neighbors who believed the neighborhood was geographically and halakhically impossible to enclose in an eruv. Chabad's Crown Heights beth din rabbinical court issued a ruling rejecting the eruv as a "devastation of the Shabbat." A few months after the eruv was repeatedly vandalized and its organizers allegedly harassed, two Chabad members were arrested and charged with criminal mischief, although the New York City Police Department had previously said that they would be charged with criminal mischief as a hate crime and criminal tampering.
