= Brower Park =

Public park in Brooklyn, New York

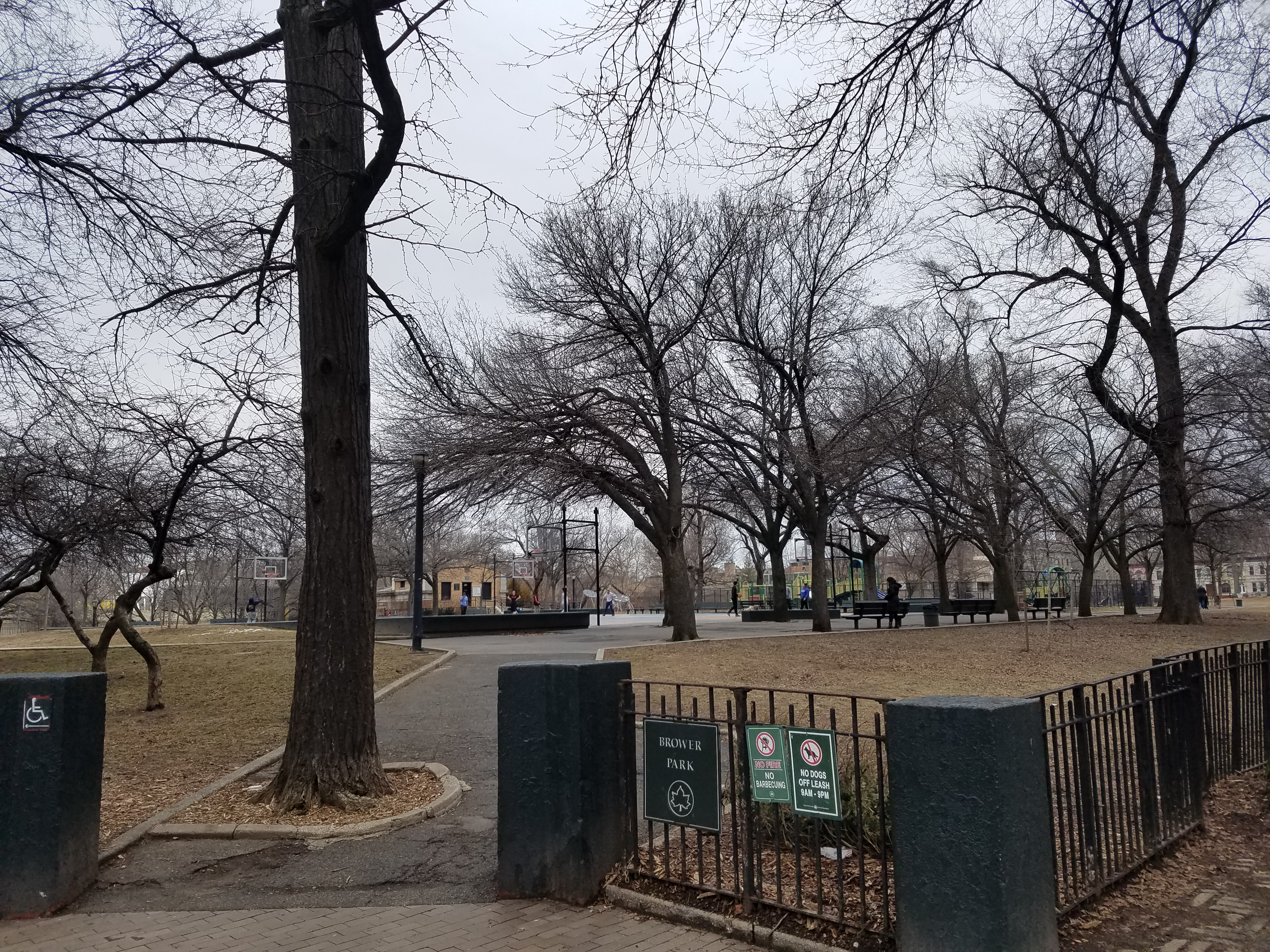
- Brower Park in February 2018

- Location within New York City Location within New York Location within the United States
- Type: Urban park
- Location: Crown Heights, Brooklyn, New York City, New York, United States
- Coordinates: 40°40′28″N 73°56′38″W
- Area: 4.5-acre (0.018 km^{2})
- Created: 1892
- Website: Official website

Brower Park is a municipal park in Crown Heights, Brooklyn, New York City. It is located between Brooklyn Avenue to the west and Kingston Avenue to the east, and between St. Marks Avenue to the north and Park Place to the south. The T-shaped park encompasses roughly 4 acres (1.6 ha) and shares a square block with the Brooklyn Children's Museum and P.S. 289 George V Brower.

== History ==
The park, like the elementary school which occupies the same block, was named after George Vanderhoof Brower (c. 1839–1921), the Commissioner of Parks for the boroughs of Brooklyn and Queens from 1889 to 1894 and from 1898 to 1901. Previously known as Bedford Park, the park was renamed after Brower in 1921. After serving as an apprentice to a Pennsylvania judge, George Brower moved to Brooklyn in 1867 to practice law. He served as general appraiser of the Port of New York for four years before being appointed as Commissioner of Parks. Brower died in his home, at 1084 Park Place directly southeast of the park, in 1921.

The City of Brooklyn purchased what is now the southern portion of the park in 1892. A comfort station was erected in the park 1905, and a World War I memorial was dedicated there in 1919. The park was altered in 1936 by the addition of drinking fountains, benches, and a playground. A park improvement scheme in 1939 provided the park with a new grass lawn planted by boy scouts. These improvements were completed in 1941. Additional parkland was purchased in 1947. The George V. Brower School (P.S. 289) opened in 1958, and Prospect Place was closed between Brooklyn and Kingston Avenues, bringing together the northern and southern portions of the park. In the 1950s, a new playground and handball courts were constructed. A monarch butterfly garden was built in 2014 with the help of the Friends of Brower Park. The Shirley Chisholm Circle was dedicated in 2016. The paved, circular terrace along Kingston Avenue was named after Shirley Chisholm, an American politician, educator, and author who, in 1968, became the first African American woman elected to the United States Congress. Chisholm represented New York's 12th Congressional District for seven terms from 1969 to 1983.

== Facilities ==
Brower Park has basketball courts, bathrooms, fitness paths, handball courts, a playground, a skate park, and spray showers.

=== Brower Park Skate Park ===
The Brower Park skate park opened September 10, 2011, the second concrete skatepark in Brooklyn. Eric Adams, who was State Senator at the time, approved the skate park. An organization led by Traci and Jay Johnson rallied for the park to be built. The park consists of handful of boxes/ledges, and a small ramp.

== Gallery ==
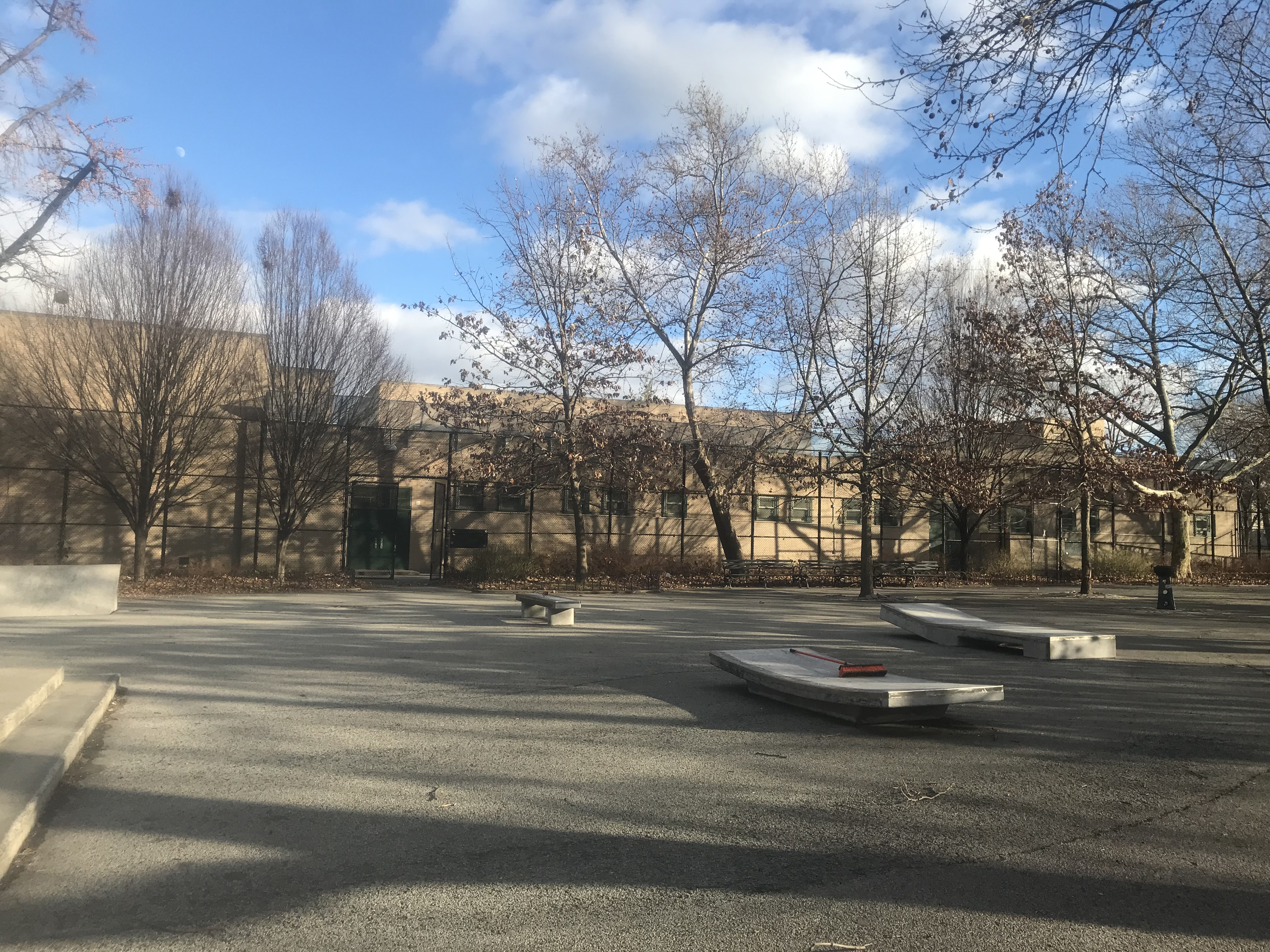
Brower Park Skatepark - January 2020

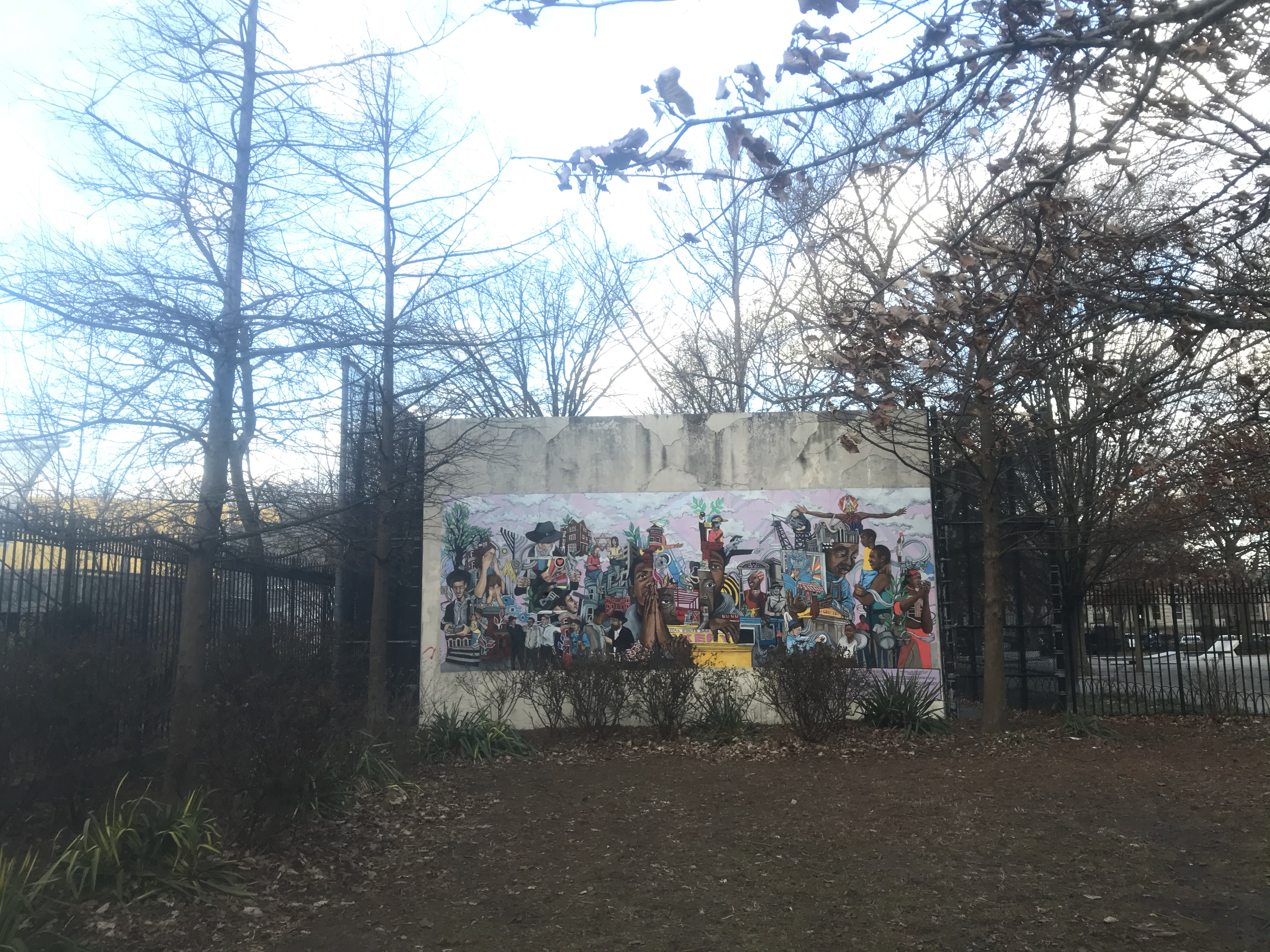
Mural in Brower Park - January 2020
