= Mark D. Naison =

American professor and activist

- Born: 1946 (age 79–80); Brooklyn, New York City
- Other name: Dr. Naison
- Occupation: History professor
- Known for: political activism

Academic background
- Education: Columbia University

Academic work
- Discipline: Historian
- Sub-discipline: African-American history; 20th century American history
- Institutions: Fordham University
- Notable works: Before the Fires: The Bronx An Oral History of African American Life in the Bronx from the 1930s to the 1960s

Mark D. Naison (born 1946) is a professor of history at Fordham University, the Jesuit University of New York.

Naison, a former political activist, was a member of Congress of Racial Equality (CORE) and Students for a Democratic Society (SDS) in the 1960s. He is a graduate of Columbia University and holds a Ph.D. in American history.

== Early life ==
Mark D. Naison was born in 1946 in the Crown Heights section of Brooklyn, New York. As the only child of Jewish intellectuals (both schoolteachers), Mark D. Naison had an easy childhood. Although he was happy as a child, Naison felt ostracized from his peers because his parents put such an importance on intelligence. Naison rebelled and turned to sports as an outlet and to help him fit in better with the neighbor kids.

== Early Days at Columbia University ==
Naison entered Columbia University in the fall of 1962. By the end of his freshman year, he began to feel like he had to oppose racial segregation more actively. By the fall of 1963, he joined the Columbia chapter of the Congress of Racial Equality (CORE). CORE is a civil rights organization that was pivotal in the United States, particularly in the 1950s and 1960s. CORE was started in 1942 and was open to "anyone who believes that 'all people are created equal' and is willing to work towards the ultimate goal of true equality throughout the world." CORE quickly became one of the university's biggest political-action groups. He signed up to tutor and help organize tenants in East Harlem. He earned his BA and MA in American History at Columbia in June 1966 and June 1967, respectively. Naison went on to earn his Ph.D. in American History from Columbia in January 1976.

== Students for a Democratic Society ==
By 1967, Naison was participating in anti-war activities sponsored by Students for a Democratic Society (SDS). Although Naison was against the Vietnam War, he had objections to SDS's political style. He felt that they were too wrapped up in Marxist thinking and not concerned enough with the human aspect of the war. In the spring of 1967, SDS held a demonstration against the Reserve Officers’ Training Corps (ROTC) on the Columbia campus. Naison participated in the demonstration, but to distinguish himself from SDS members, he wore his athletic jacket and carried a sign saying "jocks for peace". In February 1968 Naison was arrested for civil disobedience at a protest on the Columbia campus at the proposed Harlem site for the new gym. In April of that same year, Naison's father and Martin Luther King Jr. died within two weeks of each other. Both of these deaths had profound impacts on Naison. At this point in his life he decided that he needed to be more involved in radical politics. Two weeks after King's death there was another protest against the gym and again Naison participated. This time it was organized by the Columbia chapter of SDS and SAS (Student African-American Society). Mark Rudd, SDS's leader, urged the group (of almost 500) to seize buildings to make sure their voices were heard. They soon overtook Hamilton Hall, giving them leverage that no other demonstration had ever held. During the building occupation, Naison spoke briefly about the historical context of the march. During his speech he said that "the forces opposing university expansion have the upper hand. Let's not leave this building until we get some serious concessions." During the protest, Naison realized that while he did not necessarily agree with SDS's contempt for white protesters, he also felt that their tactics in the gym protest were far more effective, a realization that led him to join SDS after the strike. After he joined, Naison was asked by Rudd to use his knowledge of African-American and labor movement history to argue that the nationalist impulse was a progressive force in African-American life in SDS's leadership's fight against the Progressive Labor Movement. The PLM (generally referred to as PL) included members of SDS who were arguing that black nationalism was reactionary and that no revolution could be built with separate black and white wings. By that fall, Naison had taken on an even greater role in SDS, both in the regional offices and nationally. He participated in many protests and attended the SDS national convention in Chicago in 1969.

When the group calling itself Weatherman was instituted at the SDS national convention in Chicago, Naison was there. Naison even joined another member of the group to sign a lease on a house in South Brooklyn. Naison participated in discussions for the Days of Rage to be held in Chicago in the fall of 1969. On a Saturday in October 1969 all that changed. Naison was in a park with a group of friends, and while there they met a group of teenagers. They started talking and soon learned that a café across the way would not serve them because they looked like hippies. Furious, Naison and the others marched into the café and demanded that they be served. The police were called and a fight ensued resulting in eleven arrests. After a couple of days in jail, Naison was released on bail (by his comrades) with the assumption that he would contact a gym teacher at a local school to get the word out about the Days of Rage. Naison did not want to put his life on the line and be back in jail within the week. After tangling with members of the Weatherman, Naison ceased associating with the group. Naison was briefly investigated by the FBI. According to his memoir, the FBI bugged his house electronically and tried to question his neighbors, who, however, refused to say anything about him. After three days, the FBI was satisfied that he was no longer in the Weatherman and they left him alone. Naison lost one of his dearest friends, Ted Gold, during the accidental explosion of a Greenwich Village townhouse by an amateur SDS bomb-making group. Kathy Boudin, in the house at the time, had been one of his favorite contacts in the New York Collective, and she survived the blast. In his grief over the loss of Gold, Naison wrote a poem, published in Radical America, as a tribute to his fallen friend.

"I remember Ted Gold best...
"He is dead...
Of a bomb meant for better targets..."

== Presently ==
Asked about his arrest during the Columbia incident, Naison replied, "Getting arrested to protest Columbia's attempt to build a gym in a Harlem Park was something I was proud of at the time—and am still proud of now." Naison claims that his only regret in life has been not leaving Weatherman when they started talking about getting rid of monogamy.

Naison has been on the faculty of Fordham University in New York City since 1970, where he is Professor of African American Studies and History, Director of the Bronx African American History Project, and has served as Director of Urban Studies. His most popular course at Fordham, "From Rock & Roll to Hip Hop: Urban Youth Cultures in Post War America", was the subject of an interview with him on National Public Radio.

He has written over a hundred articles and published three books on urban history, African-American History, and the history of sports. Naison has also appeared on The O'Reilly Factor, Chappelle's Show, and the Discovery Channel's The Greatest American. He has also been an outspoken critic of Teach for America.

Naison is co-founder of the Badass Teachers Association, a group dedicated to fighting the Common Core Curriculum and corporate influences on American education.

== Publications ==
- Communists in Harlem During the Depression (1984)
- White Boy: A Memoir (2002)
- It Takes a Village to Raise a Child: Growing Up in the Patterson Houses in the 1950s - An Interview with Archibald Good" (2003) - Published in the Spring 2003 issue of the Bronx County Historical Journal
- From Doo Wop to Hip Hop: The Bittersweet Odyssey of African Americans in the South Bronx" (2004) - Published in the Spring 2004 issue of the Bronx County Historical Journal
- Pure Bronx (2013) - Co-written with Melissa Castillo-Garsow
- Badass Teachers Unite! Writing on Education, History, and Youth Activism (2014)
- Before the Fires: An Oral History of African American Life in the Bronx from the 1930s to the 1960s (2016) - Co-written with Bob Gumbs
