= Frank B. Dilley =

American philosopher

- Born: 17 November 1931; Athens, Ohio
- Died: 18 April 2018 (aged 86); Delaware
- Occupation: Philosopher

Frank Brown Dilley (17 November 1931 – 18 April 2018) was an American philosopher who served for many years as Chair of the Philosophy Department at University of Delaware.

== Biography ==
Dilley obtained BA and MA degrees from Ohio University, a Master of Divinity from Union Theological Seminary and a PhD from Union Theological Seminary and Columbia University. He became Chair of the Philosophy Department at University of Delaware in 1967. He was influential in bringing the American Philosophical Association headquarters to the University of Delaware. He was executive director of the American Philosophical Association in 1990–1991. Dilley was president of the University of Delaware's Faculty Senate and received the Excellence in Service Award in 1995. He was the co-founder of Delaware Humanities Forum (DHF) and was a member of its council.

Dilley defended substance dualism and theistic finitism.

== Family ==
Dilley's father Frank was Director of Admissions at Ohio University, his mother was Geneva Steiner Dilley. He had two brothers and a sister, all academics. He was married to Jane Dilley, they had several children; Brian, Carol and Kathryn.

== Selected publications ==
- Metaphysics and Religious Language (1964)
- Mind-Brain Interaction and PSI (1988)
- Philosophical Interactions with Parapsychology: The Major Writings of H. H. Price on Parapsychology and Survival (1995)
- A Finite God Reconsidered (2000)
- Taking Consciousness Seriously: A Defense of Cartesian Dualism (2004)
