= Badass Teachers Association =

Social justice activist organization

The Badass Teachers Association (BAT or BATs) is an education and social justice activist organization that challenges what it describes as corporate-driven education reform efforts and advocates for social justice.

== History ==
The Badass Teachers Association (BAT) is an American education activist organization. BAT was founded on June 14, 2013 by Priscilla Sanstead and Mark D. Naison. Mark Naison left BAT in April 2014.

The BAT mission statement says that the organization was created to give voice to every teacher who refuses to be blamed for the failure of society to erase poverty and inequality through education. According to BAT, its members refuse to accept assessments, tests and evaluations created and imposed by so-called corporate-driven entities that have contempt for authentic teaching and learning. The BAT goals are to reduce or eliminate the use of high-stakes testing, increase teacher autonomy in the classroom and work to include teacher and family voices in legislative decision-making processes that affect students. BAT teachers engage in organized group actions such as phone calls, emails, or letter writing. As Sanstead claimed, "vexed teachers raising their hands quietly was not working. "

BAT has a closed Facebook page with over 56,000 members, a Twitter feed with over 23,000 followers, a website, a blog, Facebook groups in every state, International Facebook groups for teachers, and special interest Facebook groups where members can go and "chat" about their special areas of expertise in education.

BAT began as a Facebook group, but its current purpose is to organize education activism around the nation. BAT members present on panels at conferences, write op-eds that appear in local, national, and state news outlets, and organize protests/events.

BAT has held two summer events to protest US Department of Education policies, and held a Teachers Congress in 2015.

Some commentators have stated that BAT is "left leaning" organization in its political messaging.

== Activity ==
- October 24, 2013 - On Long Island, New York, BAT Executive Director Marla Kilfoyle testified before a New York State Assembly hearing about how standardized testing had harmed her son, and stated that the Common Core Standards was a developmentally-inappropriate teaching method.
- November 2, 2013 - In New Jersey, BAT Assistant Executive Director Melissa Tomlinson attended a campaign rally held by New Jersey Governor Chris Christie. Tomlinson asked Christie "Why, do you continue to spread the myth that our schools and teachers are failing?" Christie reportedly replied, "Because they are!" Christie also said: "I am tired of you people. What do you want?" This confrontation landed Tomlinson on the national news.
- January 28, 2014 - In Renton, Washington, two members of the NEA BAT Caucus, Julianna Krueger Dauble and Becca Ritchie, attended a Board of Education meeting and read "statements of professional conscience". In these statements, the teachers said they would refuse to administer standardized tests to their students.
- February 2014 - BAT revived the Twitter hashtag #Evaluate, which trended with stories of teachers performing work beyond their job requirements for students.
- June 26, 2014- In Washington State, over 300 BAT teachers staged a protest during rush hour against the alleged influence of The Gates Foundation. Protestors alleged that the Foundation funds organizations that blames teachers and teacher unions for struggling schools. The protest was aimed at highlight links between childhood poverty and school performance.
- July 28, 2014 - In Washington, D.C. over 500 teachers, parents and students staged a protest in front of the USDOE. The protest resulted in a 45-minute meeting with Secretary of Education Arne Duncan.
- October 27, 2014 - BAT responded to the cover of Time magazine that purportedly labeled teachers as "Rotten Apples". Time later printed a response to the BAT charges.
- November 7, 2014 - The California BAT issued a statement in support of Ethnic Studies in California classrooms
- November 9, 2014 - The Tennessee BAT co-hosted "Educating Nashville", an education forum featuring noted education historian Diane Ravitch. BAT stated that the goal of the forum was expose the hoax of education privatization.
- November 28, 2014 - Members of the Washington State Badass Teachers Association plan a Boycott of Microsoft on Black Friday.
- February 10, 2015 - Members of the Florida Badass Teachers Association protest an education summit held by Jeb Bush. FLBATS protest Bush's education policies that have been reported to be a massive failure in Florida.
- June 23, 2015 - The Oregon State Badass Teachers Association led a protest against testing giant Pearson at their national conference held at the Hilton in Portland, Oregon
- August 20, 2015 - The Ohio Badass Teachers Association take to social media to fight against the privatization efforts of Gov. Kasich in Ohio. They are recognized in the media for the creation of their Twitter hashtag #NeverVote4Kasich.
- September 5, 2015 - Ohio Badass Teacher Dawn Neely-Randall makes strong national statement that she can no longer throw her students to the "testing wolves".
- October 17, 2015 - Members of the New York Badass Teachers Association co-host and help to plan a conference for educational justice titled Call to Educational Justice!! Lean In.

== Policy Work ==
In 2014/2015 The Badass Teachers Association teamed up with the American Federation of Teachers to conduct a Quality of Work Life Survey in order to study teacher working conditions. The Survey which had over 80 questions was completed by 30,000 teachers. The results found that 1 in 5 educators feel respected by government officials or the media. 14% strongly agree with the statement that they trust their administrator or supervision. 75% say they do not have enough staff to get the work done. 78% say they are often physically and emotionally exhausted at the end of the day. 87% say the demands of their job are at least sometimes interfere with their family life. As a result of this survey Senator Cory Booker and Senator Michael Bennet created the Booker-Bennet Amendment which was added to the Reauthorization of the Elementary and Secondary Education Act. The Act called for a comprehensive study of teacher workplace stress and working conditions. It would require that Title II funds be used to conduct and publicly report on educator workplace conditions.

In the summer of 2015 The Badass Teachers Association conducted a "Lobby Day" in which over 60 appointments were made in Washington D.C. by BATs from over 25 states to speak with federal lawmakers about education policy and education decision making. At the event it was reported that BATs from New York, Washington State, Oregon, and Virginia occupied Senator Bernie Sanders office until his staff agreed to talk with organizers of the association about education policy. Sen. Sanders education liaison in Washington D.C. subsequently called BATs Executive Director Marla Kilfoyle to talk about education policy and procedures.

The Badass Teachers Association created a caucus in the National Education Association (NEA) in 2014 which grew to over 200 members by 2015. They also created a caucus in the American Federation of Teachers (AFT) in 2016.

== Ongoing Efforts ==
The Badass Teachers Association submitted an Amicus Brief in the case of Friedrichs vs. CTA in November 2015. BATs continue to appear frequently on radio stations and podcasts such as the Education Town Hall, Just Let Me Teach Radio, The Jeff Santos Show, and The Rick Smith Show.

== Criticism ==
The group has been known to remove people from its Facebook group for challenging its message. It has removed members who disagreed with its leadership on certain issues and deleted messages that it found "inappropriate". It also purged students from the group.

Some critics have questioned the allegiances that the group has made with the Tea Party and related groups, as part of their shared opposition to issues like the Common Core State Standards Initiative. The organization defines itself solely as a "left leaning" organization.
