= Regina Herzlinger =

American businessperson and academic

Regina E. Herzlinger (born c.1943) is an American businessperson and academic. She is the Nancy R. McPherson Professor of Business Administration at Harvard Business School (HBS) where she teaches courses about Innovating in Health Care in the Master of Business Administration program. Herzlinger was the first woman to obtain tenure or become a chair at HBS. She has also been the first woman on several public company boards. Her approach has been described as socially liberal and fiscally conservative.

== Background ==
Herzlinger was born Regina Elbinger circa 1943 in Tel Aviv, Israel, to Ella and Alexander Elbinger. Her father was the last in a line of renowned rabbinical scholars. He had fled Russia in the 1920s. Herzlinger's parents then fled Nazi-controlled Germany in 1939 and moved to Palestine, which allowed entrance because he had presciently bought housing there. Her lively mother was a smart card player and her father a successful businessman. The Elbingers emigrated to the United States when Regina was eight years old. She grew up in a Jewish community in Crown Heights, Brooklyn, where she attended a small Orthodox yeshiva, graduating in 1961. She was the first woman from her school to leave the community and the first from that high school to enter MIT . Herzlinger received a bachelor's degree in economics from Massachusetts Institute of Technology in 1965. Herzlinger met her future husband, George Herzlinger, when they were classmates at MIT. They were married in 1966 .They had two children -a physician and a retired 10th mountain infantry division captain and medical device specialist - and four grandchildren,

After graduating from MIT, Herzlinger worked as a consultant  and  obtained her  Doctor of Business Administration degree from HBS in 1972. Shortly after being told, in 1972, that  she, as a woman, could not  teach   there because women cannot teach in a  male dominated environment, she  quietly  resigned her HBS  Assistant Professor tenure track position. When she was asked to return in 1973, and allowed to teach, she was  pregnant  with her first child, whose birth   her remarkable  students celebrated.  She celebrated  earning  the first student-selected award as best teacher in 1999>.[4][5][6]

== Career ==
Herzlinger has served as director or board member of Bard, Cardinal Health, ChemoCentryx, HCR Manor Care (bankrupt), John Deere, Lumenos (now Anthem Inc.), Noven Pharmaceuticals (now Hisamitsu Pharmaceutical), Physicians Interactive, RealMed Corporation, Schering-Plough, Total Renal Care (where as chairperson of the firm's reorganization committee, she named her former student as the CEO of what is now DaVita Inc.), and Zimmer Holdings. To assure alignment with the public shareholders' interests, her compensation was received only in stock and never in cash Herzlinger sat on the board of WellCare from 2003 to 2010 where she led the board's audit committee. She resigned in 2010, citing a lack of co-operation from other board members in her efforts to deal with a number of accounting errors.

Herzlinger describes herself as a healthcare "consumer -driven health care activist" and argues to correct governmental and insurance barriers to the transparency and funding that health care users need. Although she admires the excellent technology, physicians, and care sites of US health care, she cites the use of the word "patient", as in health care consumers must be patient, for evidence of a self referential health care system. Her HBS students are required to create a business plan for a health care innovation .Many have founded a number of health care innovations that often, but not always, do good and do well and staffed the health care venture and private equity firms whose number and activity blossomed during the decades that she has taught her Innovating in Health Care courses,

She has advised the United States Congress and President George W. Bush on healthcare policy. Herzlinger serves on an advisory committee of the U.S. Centers for Disease Control and has served on the Scientific Advisory Group of the United States Secretary of the Air Force. She was instrumental in the introduction of a bipartisan law in the US House of Representatives that requires hospitals, in real time, to share data about their available or needed ICU beds with hospitals in their region during a public health emergency .She hopes this law will avoid the needless morbidity and mortality during COVID and other emergencies, when due to the absence of shared capacity data, patients were directed to overcrowded hospitals rather than neighboring ones with available resources. Herzlinger is the author of several best-selling books and has written for The Wall Street Journal, NY Times, and HuffPost. She was profiled by the Economist as her book, Who Killed Health Care?, was recognized by the United States Chamber of Commerce as one of the 10 most influential books in the healthcare debate.

Herzlinger founded Belmont Medical Technologies (formerly known as Belmont Instrument Corporation) with her husband. Their company's medical technology, which has saved many lives, is primarily designed for fluid warming and temperature regulation and as a bridge to heart transplant, with George Herzlinger's -an MIT Phd in Physics—design of the intra-aortic Balloon Pump.

Herzlinger is also closely involved with the Commission on the Accreditation of Healthcare Management Education (CAHME). In collaboration with CAHME, the Herzlingers developed the CAHME/George and Regi Herzlinger Innovation Education Award. It has been awarded to five schools of health care management for their advances in teaching health care innovation.

Herzlinger has created The GENiE Group (Global Educators Network for Health Innovation Education), a charity devoted to furthering health care innovation and funding .

== Selected publications ==
- Market-Driven Health Care: Who Wins, Who Loses in the Transformation of America's Largest Service Industry? (Boston, USA: Perseus, 2000)
- Consumer-Driven Health Care: Implications for Providers, Payers, and Policymakers (San Francisco, USA: Jossey-Bass, 2004)
- Who Killed Health Care? (New York, USA: McGraw-Hill, 2009)

== Awards ==
Herzlinger has twice received the American College of Healthcare Executives James A. Hamilton Book of the Year Award (1977 and 1998).
