= When Bad Things Happen to Good People =

1981 book by Harold Kushner

- First edition
- Author: Harold Kushner
- Language: English
- Subject: Theism; God; Religion
- Genre: Non-fiction
- Publisher: Schocken Books
- Publication date: 1981
- Publication place: United States
- Pages: 176 pp
- ISBN: 1-4000-3472-8
- OCLC: 56349149
- Followed by: To Life: A Celebration of Jewish Being and Thinking

When Bad Things Happen to Good People (ISBN 1-4000-3472-8) is a 1981 book by Harold Kushner, a Conservative rabbi. Kushner addresses in the book one of the principal problems of theodicy, the conundrum of why, if the universe was created and is governed by a God who is of a good and loving nature, there is nonetheless so much suffering and pain in it—essentially, the evidential problem of evil. The book argues for theistic finitism. Kushner proposes a finite God solution to the problem of evil. God is benevolent but not all-powerful to prevent evil.

Rabbi Kushner's book was a New York Times bestseller for many months in the non-fiction category. It has been translated into at least a dozen languages.

== Thesis ==
Kushner seeks to offer comfort to grieving people. His answer to the philosophical problem is that God does his best and is with people in their suffering, but is not fully able to prevent it.

Kushner's beliefs, which seem to question God's omnipotence, have been criticized by some conservative scholars associated with Orthodox Judaism as well as evangelical Christianity.

Atheist philosopher Michael Martin has disputed Kushner's finite God theodicy.

== Recognition ==
- New York Times bestseller, "nonfiction"
