= When All You've Ever Wanted Isn't Enough =

1986 book by Harold Kushner

- First edition
- Author: Harold Kushner
- Language: English
- Subject: Theism; God; Religion
- Genre: Non-fiction
- Publisher: Summit Books
- Publication date: 1986
- Publication place: United States
- Pages: 192 pp
- ISBN: 0-7432-3473-1

When All You've Ever Wanted Isn't Enough: The Search for a Life That Matters (ISBN 0-7432-3473-1) is a 1986 book by Harold Kushner, a Conservative rabbi. Kushner addresses in the book matters of existentialism, particularly the meaning of life and the individual pursuit of happiness.

Kusher explained that he aimed to explore why individuals who achieve success may not feel fulfilled with their lives.

When All You've Ever Wanted Isn't Enough makes several references to the book of Ecclesiastes, which is described as "the most dangerous book in the Bible" because it asks readers to think about life instead of blindly worshipping. Kushner argues that readers can learn from Ecclesiastes that life is its own reward, that death is less fearful than never having lived, and that the worst hell is realizing that one could have been a better human being but never made the effort. It also drew insights from modern thinkers like psychologist Carl Jung, author Johann Wolfgang von Goethe, and philosophers Jean-Paul Sartre and Martin Buber.

When All You've Ever Wanted Isn't Enough was a bestseller and won a Christopher Award in 1987.
