= Spartanburg High School =

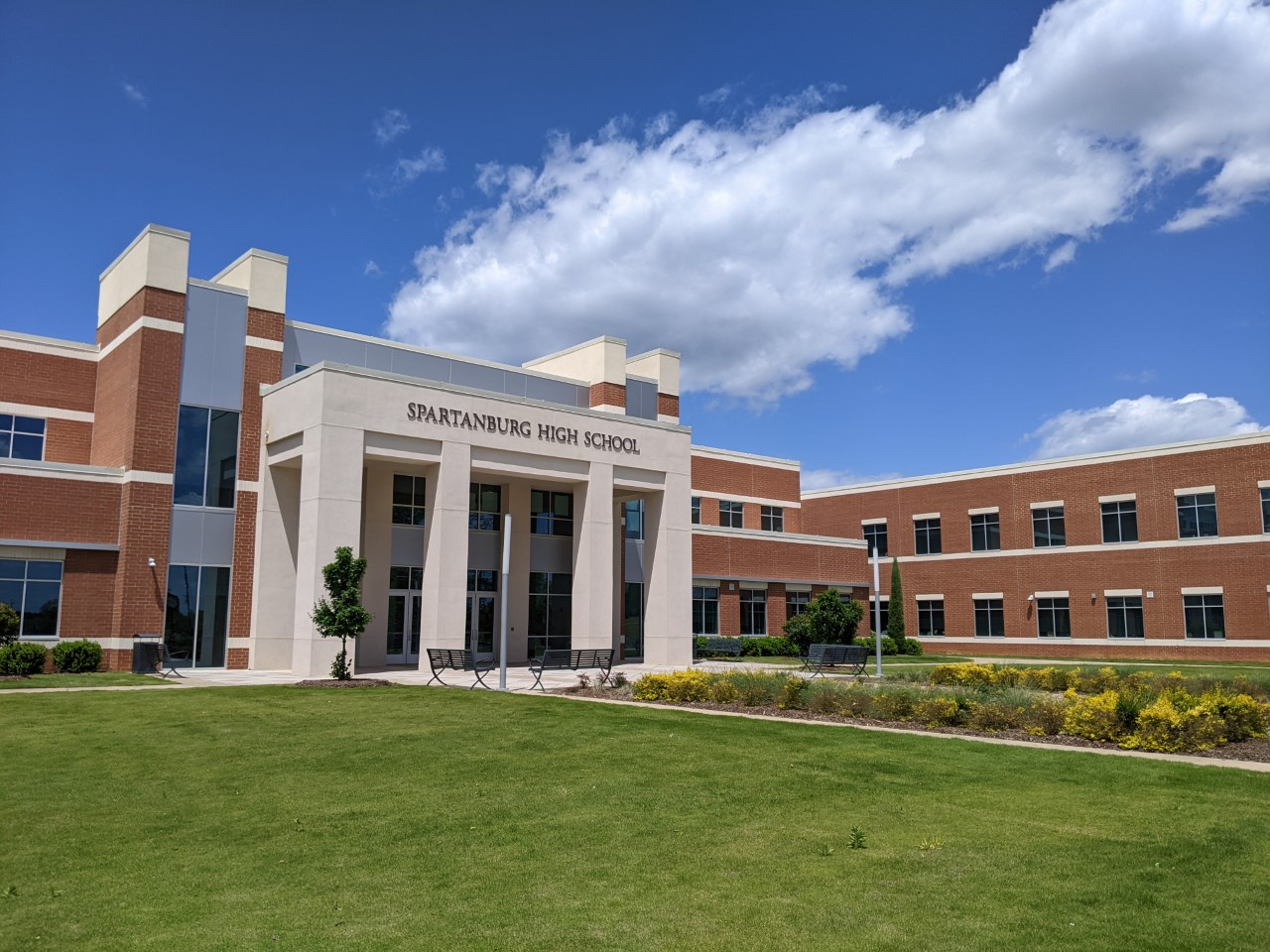
- Spartanburg High School in 2023

Location
- 2250 East Main Street; Spartanburg, South Carolina 29307; United States
- Coordinates: 34°58′46″N 81°52′47″W

Information
- Type: Public; Secondary
- Motto: Sapientia, Vires, et Pax (Wisdom, Strength, and Peace)
- School district: Spartanburg County School District 7
- Principal: Andrew McMillan
- Staff: 137.45 (FTE)
- Grades: 9–12
- Gender: Co-educational
- Enrollment: 2,205 (2023–2024)
- Student to teacher ratio: 16.04
- Campus size: 189 acres (764,856 m²)
- Campus type: Urban (small city)
- Colors: Navy and gold
- Mascot: Viking
- Rival: Gaffney High School
- Accreditation: Blue Ribbon
- Newspaper: Norse News
- Website: www.spartanburg7.org/o/spartanburghigh

Spartanburg High School is a public high school in Spartanburg, South Carolina, United States. It is part of Spartanburg County School District 7.

The current principal is Andrew McMillan, former principal of Chapman High School in Inman, South Carolina.

== History ==
Spartanburg High School began operations under the name of Converse Street High School in 1897. The institution was run in a six-classroom building near Spartanburg's downtown. The original student body numbered less than 200, with ten faculty members in charge. A new wing was added to the facility facing South Dean Street in 1921, and was concurrently renamed Frank Evans High School in honor of a district superintendent. This building became a middle school in 1959 after the high school was relocated to a new building located at 50 Emory Road in Spartanburg. The former site of Evans Junior High is now the Downtown Campus of Spartanburg Community College; the property at 50 Emory Road is the current location of McCracken Middle School.

In 1970, integration of public schools was ordered by federal courts. Carver High School, a former Spartanburg educational facility and historically black institution, closed, merging with Spartanburg High School; the Carver High School campus is now the location of Carver Middle School. Following integration, Spartanburg High School's mascot, the Viking, and school colors, blue and gold, were chosen. To accommodate for the influx of new students, the school was renovated, with 41 new classrooms, a media center, and student center being among the additions to the campus.

=== Relocation and current building ===
On March 15, 2016, residents of Spartanburg County School District 7 voted on a bond referendum allocating $185 million for three building projects, one of which proposed relocating Spartanburg High School onto a former country club property situated along U.S. Route 29 in Spartanburg. Construction of a new high school building on the site would be funded by a tax increase of 10 mills. The measure passed with 63% of 7,191 voters in favor of the plan.

On December 14, 2016, ground was broken on the site of the future Spartanburg High School campus at a ceremony with about 200 attendees. Work on the site commenced early in 2017, with as many as 200 personnel following an "aggressive" completion schedule for the project. During this period, construction went over-budget by around $10 million as a result of preparation of the property for building. However, work was completed in time for the 2019-20 school year, with doors opening at the new Spartanburg High School at 2250 East Main Street on August 19, 2019.

== Campus ==
The current campus of Spartanburg High School measures nearly 200 acres, a ~300% increase in size from the previous site on Emory Road in Spartanburg. The main academic building contains 124 classrooms across two stories and four wings. Two outdoor wings exist as courtyard spaces, and a basement wing serves as the athletic department. Attached to the academic building is the District 7 Fine Arts Center, which possesses a seating capacity of 1,000, and the Viking Arena, which can seat up to 2,500 people.

Outdoor features of the school's campus include the Viking Stadium, which has 7,500 seats. Numerous other athletic areas support track and field, baseball, softball, and tennis. Spartanburg High School's walking trails, outdoor classroom, wetlands, and irrigation system, alongside the property's energy efficiency measures, resulted in the school receiving two Green Globe Awards from the Green Building Initiative in 2020; it is the ninth such institution nationally to receive this distinction, and the first in South Carolina.

== Programs ==
=== Academics ===
==== School performance ====
As of 2022, Spartanburg High School's on-time graduation rate was 85.4%, equivalent to that of Spartanburg School District 7 and 1.6% higher than the state average. 5.4% of students at the school dropped out, up 2.7% from the year prior. The number of students facing grade retention was 4.5%, and the rate of chronic student absenteeism increased 16.1% from the previous term to 34.3%. Gifted and talented program participation decreased from the 2021 rate by 2.9% to 17.1%. Spartanburg High School received an "Average" rating of 57/100 on their 2022 SCDOE School Report Card, indicating the institution's performance met criteria enabling all students to fulfill state graduation requirements.

==== Accolades ====
- Washington Post: "America's Most Challenging High Schools" (5 times, consecutively)
- National Blue Ribbon School (4 times, non-consecutively)

=== Arts ===
Spartanburg High School hosts classes for band, choir, orchestra, theatre, and visual arts.

In 2022, Spartanburg High School won exclusive South Carolina school rights to stage the musical Frozen, marking the non-Broadway-affiliated premiere of the work in the state. The institution was picked as a representative for the state as part of the "United States of Frozen: Love is an Open Door" competition, which resulted in the selection of one high school from every American state and territory to produce the work as part of the first-ever school performances of the musical. With contributions from musicians, staff, stage crew, and 287 student actors from across Spartanburg County School District 7, the school ran two free and four ticketed, sold-out showings in the District 7 Fine Arts Center.

=== Athletics ===
Spartanburg High School offers the following seasonal sports:

Fall

- Co-ed competitive cheer
- Competitive cheer
- Boys' cross country
- Girls' cross country
- Football
- Girls' golf
- Boys' swimming
- Girls' swimming
- Girls' tennis
- Volleyball

Winter

- Boys' basketball
- Girls' basketball
- Girls' sideline cheer
- Boys' wrestling
- Co-ed wrestling

Spring

- Boys' baseball
- Boys' golf
- Boys' lacrosse
- Girls' lacrosse
- Boys' soccer
- Girls' soccer
- Girls' softball
- Boys' tennis
- Boys' track
- Girls' track

== Notable alumni ==
- Julie Story Byerley, Pediatrician and Vice Dean for Education for the University of North Carolina at Chapel Hill School of Medicine
- John Cannady, former National Football League player
- Landon Cohen, former National Football League player
- Ralph Coleman, former National Football League player. Graduated from Carver High School
- Stephen Davis, former National Football League player
- Tavien Feaster, former National Football League player
- Art Fowler (1922–2007), pitcher and pitching coach in Major League Baseball
- Steve Fuller, former National Football League player
- Trey Gowdy, Republican U.S. Congressman representing South Carolina's 4th congressional district from 2011 to 2019
- T. J. Johnston, Anglican bishop
- Bud Moore, NASCAR team owner and member of the NASCAR Hall of Fame
- Kris Neely, artist and educator
- Trip Payne, puzzlemaker
- Anthony Simmons, former National Football League player
- Laura Story, contemporary Christian music singer-songwriter
- Pete Tinsley, former National Football League player
- Sid Tinsley, former National Football League player
- Wayne Tolleson, former baseball player
- General William Westmoreland, commanding general during the Vietnam War
- Howie Williams, former National Football League player. Graduated from Carver High School

== See also ==
- List of high schools in South Carolina
