= Timeline of the history of the United States (2010–present) =

This section of the timeline of United States history includes major events from 2010 to the present.

== 2010s ==
=== Presidency of Barack Obama ===
- 2010 – The Deepwater Horizon oil rig in the Gulf of Mexico explodes, spilling millions of gallons of oil into the sea. The spill becomes the worst oil spill in American history.
- 2010 – In the 2010 Midterm elections, the Republicans retake the House of Representatives as the Democrats lose 63 seats.
- 2011 – Representative Gabrielle Giffords is severely wounded in an assassination attempt when a gunman went on a shooting spree, killing federal judge John Roll and five other people, and wounding at least 13 others, at an event Giffords was hosting in suburban Tucson, Arizona.
- 2011 – The ATF gunwalking scandal emerged, wherein thousands of guns were allowed to "walk" through interdiction to Mexico, supposedly to aid in the capture of criminals.
- 2011 – A series of tornadoes cause heavy damage in the South, Alabama being the hardest hit. 324 people are killed in the deadliest American natural disaster since Hurricane Katrina.
- 2011 – Osama bin Laden, leader of al-Qaeda and mastermind of the September 11 attacks, is killed in Abbottabad, Pakistan, by U.S. Navy SEALs.
- 2011 – Flooding devastates the Mississippi River valley causing $2 to $4 billion in damage.
- 2011 – A tornado devastates Joplin, Missouri, killing 158 and injuring over 1,000, making it the deadliest single U.S. tornado since the advent of modern weather forecasting
- 2011 – Casey Marie Anthony is acquitted of all charges related to the death of her daughter, Caylee; she was convicted of four counts of providing false information to a law enforcement officer. She was released a week later because of credit for time served.
- 2011 – STS-135: The Space Shuttle Atlantis touches down at the Shuttle Landing Facility at Kennedy Space Center, ending the 30-year shuttle program, which began with the launch of Space Shuttle Columbia on April 12, 1981.
- 2012 – A gunman kills 12 and injures 70 at a movie theater in Aurora, Colorado.
- 2012 – Hurricane Sandy strikes the Eastern Seaboard.
- 2012 – 2012 United States presidential election: Barack Obama reelected president, Joe Biden reelected vice president.
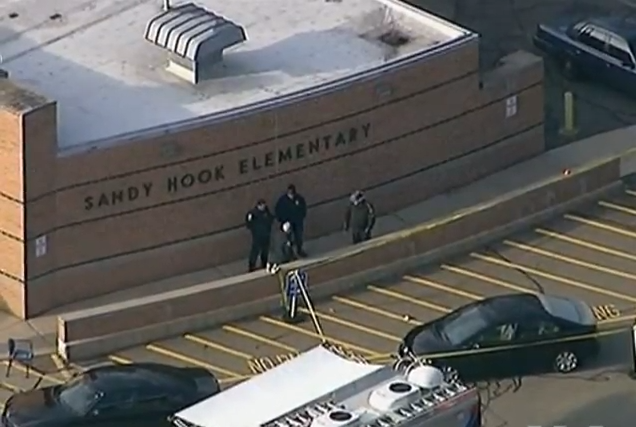
- Police arrive at Sandy Hook Elementary, after the shooting on December 14, 2012
  2012 – A gunman kills 26, including 20 children, at the Sandy Hook Elementary School in Newtown, Connecticut.
- January 20, 2013 – President Obama and Vice President Biden begin their second terms.
- 2013 – Christopher Dorner murders three people in Southern California, starting the largest manhunt in Los Angeles history. His spree ends in Big Bear Lake, California where he barricades himself in a cabin, kills a second officer, before committing suicide.
- 2013 – Edward Snowden leaks highly classified documents from the National Security Agency.
- 2013 – Terrorists attack the Boston Marathon by detonating two bombs at the finishing line of the race, killing three and injuring 283 runners and spectators. Suspects Tamerlan and Dzhokhar Tsarnaev then led Boston police on a high-speed chase, killing one officer at the Massachusetts Institute of Technology. Tamerlan was killed in a shootout with police and Dzhokhar was detained the day after.
- 2013 – A tornado devastates suburbs near Oklahoma City, killing 24.
- 2013 – The most destructive wildfire in Colorado history burns nearly 16,000 acres and kills two people.
- 2013 – The Supreme Court strikes down the Defense of Marriage Act, which banned the federal recognition of same-sex marriages and refused to recognize the legal standing of proponents of Proposition 8, which resulted in the re-legalization of same-sex marriage in California.
- 2013 – Black Lives Matter emerges as a political movement, protesting against widespread racial profiling, police brutality, and racial inequality in the United States criminal justice system.
- 2014 – A grand jury decides not to charge Officer Darren Wilson in the shooting death of Michael Brown inciting protests and riots against racism and police brutality in the St. Louis area Causing riot.
- 2014 – The Republicans win the Senate in the Midterm elections.
- 2015 – Dzhokhar Tsarnaev is convicted and sentenced to death for committing the Boston Marathon bombing.
- 2015 – Dylann Roof kills 9 people during a Bible study at the Emanuel African Methodist Episcopal Church in Charleston, South Carolina.
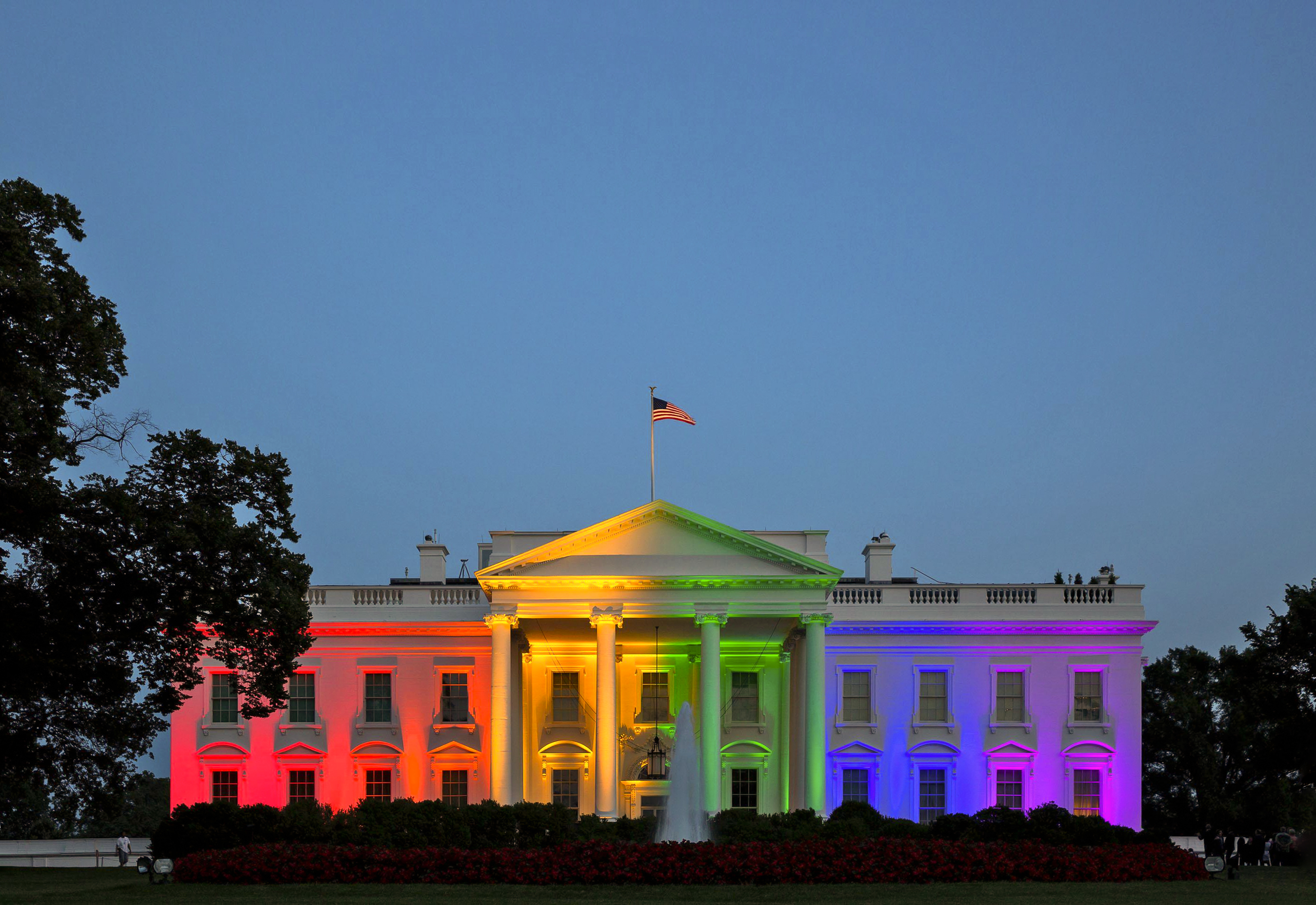
- After the Supreme Court announced the legalization of same-sex marriage following Obergefell v. Hodges, the White House is lit up in the colors of the rainbow pride flag
  2015 – Following Obergefell v. Hodges, same-sex marriage is legalized nationwide.
- 2015 – Rizwan Farook and Tashfeen Malik carried out an attack at the Inland Regional Center in San Bernardino, California, killing 14 and seriously injuring 22 others.
- 2016 – Omar Mateen kills 49 people and injures 53 members of the LGBT community at the Pulse nightclub.
- 2016 – 2016 United States presidential election: Donald Trump elected president, Mike Pence elected vice president.
- 2016 – 36 people are killed in the Oakland Warehouse Fire.
- 2017 – Fort Lauderdale airport shooting.

=== First presidency of Donald Trump ===
President Barack Obama meets with Donald Trump before his inauguration

- January 20, 2017 – Trump becomes the 45th president, Pence becomes the 48th vice president. Trump is the first person without prior military or government service to hold the office.
- 2017 – Trump fires FBI director James Comey, precipitating the Mueller investigation.
- 2017 – Relations between the U.S. and the U.N. and North Korea strain after the country tested missiles in various places.
- April 2017 – The United States drops missiles and bombs on Syria.
- 2017 – A white supremacist rally in Charlottesville, Virginia leads to three deaths and to the discussion about racism in modern American society. The term alt-right receives renewed popular consciousness.
- 2017 – Hurricane Harvey makes landfall in the United States, flooding broad swaths of Texas and Louisiana and causing tens of billions of dollars of damage, making it one of the costliest natural disasters in U.S. history.
- 2017 – Hurricane Irma makes landfall in Florida and causes tens of billions of dollars of damage. Irma also wrecks the Caribbean Islands.
- 2017 – Hurricane Maria made landfall on Puerto Rico as a Category 5 hurricane, killing hundreds and knocking out the island's power.
- October 1, 2017 – A gunman opens fire at a Las Vegas Strip concert, killing 60 people and injuring 867. This was the deadliest mass shooting in modern U.S. history.
- November 5, 2017 – A gunman kills 26 people and wounds 22 others at a church in Sutherland Springs, Texas, before killing himself. This was the deadliest mass shooting in Texas history and the deadliest shooting in an American place of worship in modern history.
- 2017 – Film producer Harvey Weinstein is accused of sexual harassment in a New York Times expose, marking the beginning of the Me Too movement.
- February 14, 2018 – A gunman kills 17 people and injures 17 at Marjory Stoneman Douglas High School in Parkland, Florida.
- 2018 – Donald Trump meets with North Korean leader Kim Jong-un in Singapore.
- 2018 – The entire West Virginia Supreme Court of Appeals is impeached.
- 2018 – In the 2018 United States elections, the Democrats retake the House while the Republicans keep the Senate.
- October 27, 2018 - A gunman opens fire on the Tree of Life congregation in the Pittsburgh synagogue shooting killing 11 and wounding 6.
- 2018 – Creator of SpongeBob SquarePants Stephen Hillenburg and Creative leader of Marvel Comics Stan Lee both die in November.
- November 30, 2018 – Former U.S. President George H. W. Bush dies from complications resulting from Parkinson's disease. He lies in the state at the U.S. Capitol building before being interred.
- 2019 – All the works published in 1923 except for sound recordings (2022 scheduled events) enter the public domain in the United States.
- January 1, 2019 – Washington bans all persons under 21 years of age from purchasing a semi-automatic rifle.
- January 25, 2019 – The second-longest government shutdown in American history, which lasted from December 22, 2018 to January 25, 2019 (35 days), officially ends.
- January 30, 2019 – Large portions of the United States are hit with a polar vortex. The city of Chicago once again hit a record low: 27 degrees below zero. It occurred for fifty-two straight hours.
- February 1, 2019 – President Donald Trump confirms that the U.S. will leave the Intermediate-range Nuclear Forces Treaty.
- 2019 – Mexican drug boss/lord Joaquín "El Chapo" Guzmán is found guilty on all ten counts at a drug-trafficking trial in New York.
- February 22, 2019 – Singer R. Kelly charged with ten counts of aggravated criminal sexual abuse for incidents dating back as far as the year 1998.
- February 27, 2019 – 2019 North Korea – United States Hanoi Summit held in Vietnam. It is the second summit between U.S. President Donald Trump and North Korean leader Kim Jong-un.
- March 26, 2019 – Vice President Mike Pence orders NASA to fly Americans to the Moon within the next five years, using either government or private carriers.
- 2019 –The Supreme Court case Bucklew V. Precythe rules 5 to 4 that inmates on death row are not guaranteed "painless executions" under the Constitution.
- April 4, 2019 – The 1973 War Powers Act Resolution is invoked for the first time when the House of Representatives votes 247–175 to end U.S. military assistance in Saudi Arabia in its intervention in the Yemeni Civil War.
- April 2019 – The first image of a black hole is taken.
- April 2019 – James Earl Carter Jr. becomes the longest ever living U.S. president at 94 years old, following the death of George H. W. Bush in December 2018.
- April 27, 2019 – A gunman kills one and injures three in a California synagogue. The suspect is white supremacist John Timothy Earnest, who was 19 years old at the time.
- May 31, 2019 – A city employee for Virginia Beach enters a municipal building with a gun and kills 12 people.
- June 8, 2019 – President Trump reaches an agreement with Mexico to avoid tariffs.
- June 9, 2019 – A construction crane falls on an apartment complex in Dallas, killing 1 person and injuring 6.
- June 14, 2019 – One person dies and two more are injured after a gunman entered a Costco in Southern California.
- July 26, 2019 – The Supreme Court rules in a 5–4 vote to give President Trump $2.5 billion to fund the Mexico–United States border wall.
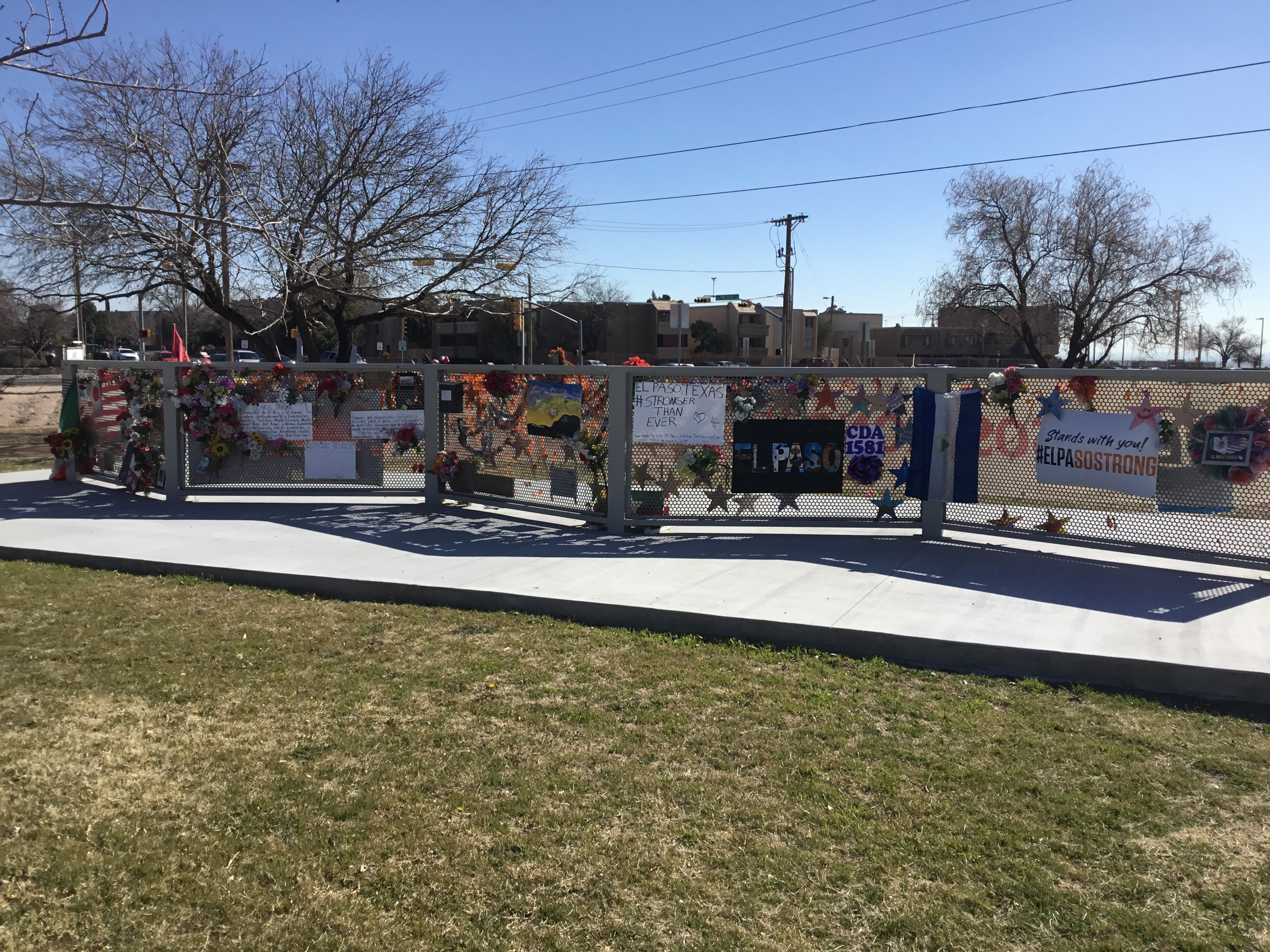
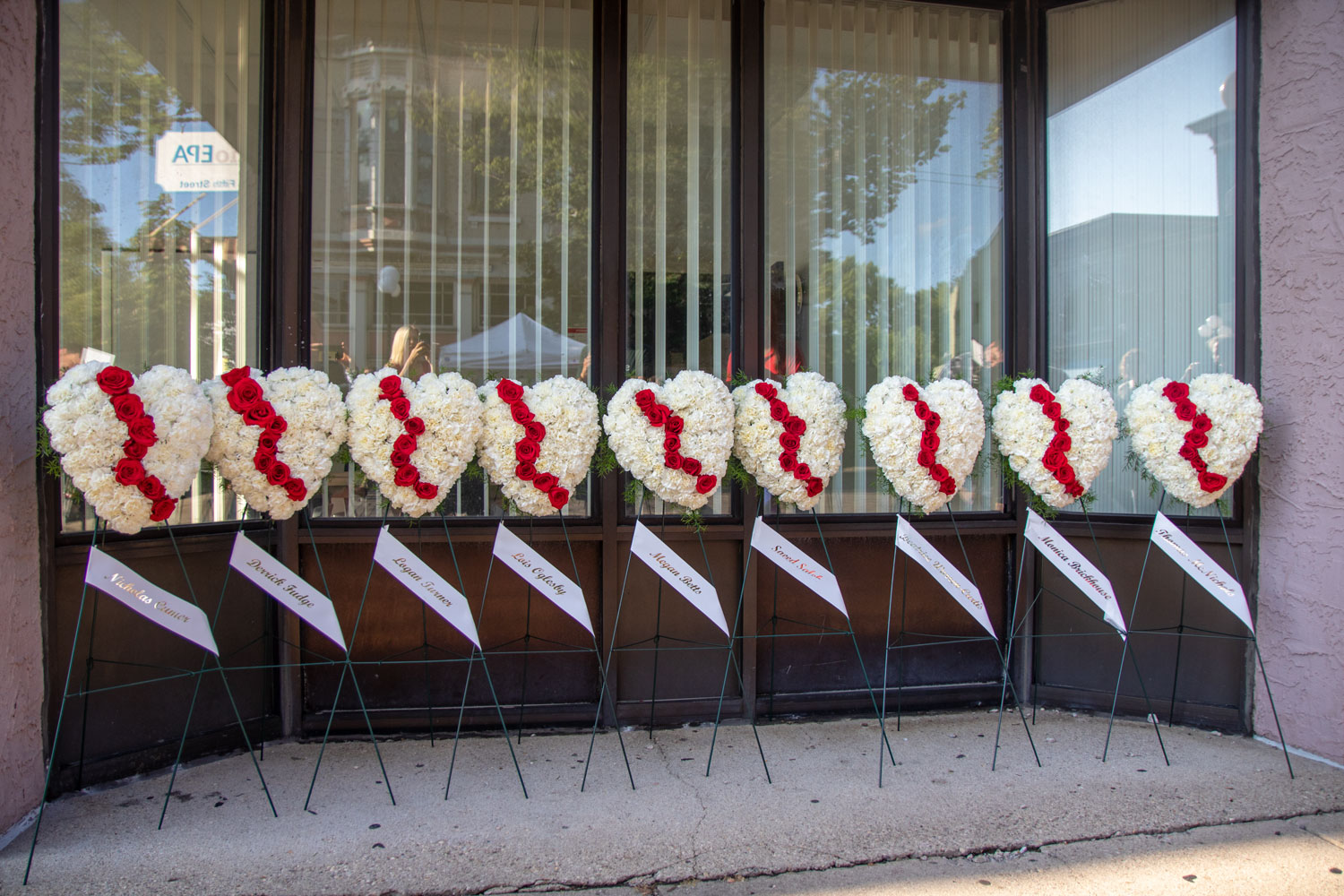
Temporary memorials created by mourners in El Paso and Dayton
- August 3, 2019 – 23 people are killed and another 23 are injured in a mass shooting at a Walmart in El Paso, Texas.
- August 4, 2019 – A gunman opens fire on a bar in Dayton, Ohio. He kills nine people and injures another 27.
- August 10, 2019 – Financier and convicted sex offender Jeffrey Epstein is found dead in his prison cell under mysterious circumstances. It was declared a suicide by hanging, although the ruling is widely disputed.
- August 12, 2019 – An anonymous whistleblower filed a complaint against Donald Trump and Rudy Giuliani, claiming that the two sought foreign intervention in the 2020 presidential election. This complaint would lead to an investigation into the Trump-Ukraine scandal.
- September 24, 2019 – Speaker of the House Nancy Pelosi announces the House of Representatives would begin an impeachment inquiry against Donald Trump.
- December 18, 2019 – The U.S. House of Representatives impeaches President Trump for high crimes and misdemeanors.

== 2020s ==
- January 3, 2020 – President Donald Trump approves the targeted killing of Iranian general Qasem Soleimani and Iraqi paramilitary leader Abu Mahdi al-Muhandis in Baghdad, Iraq.
- January 16, 2020 – The first impeachment trial of President Donald Trump begins in the U.S. Senate.
- January 21, 2020 – The first patient in the United States is diagnosed with coronavirus.
- January 26, 2020 – Kobe Bryant, along with his daughter, Gianna, and 7 others, perish in a helicopter crash.
- February 5, 2020 – The majority of the United States Senate votes to acquit President Trump of charges related to the Trump-Ukraine scandal.
- February 24, 2020 – Former film producer Harvey Weinstein is found guilty of rape.
- February 26, 2020 – 6 people are killed in a mass shooting in Milwaukee, Wisconsin before the perpetrator killed himself.
- February 29, 2020 – The Trump administration and the Taliban sign a conditional peace agreement in Doha, Qatar as part of a process to end the War in Afghanistan.
- March 3, 2020 – Super Tuesday 2020 takes place.
- March 5, 2020 – The U.S. Senate approves an $8.3 billion federal emergency aid package in response to the COVID-19 pandemic.
- March 11, 2020 – The World Health Organization officially declares COVID-19 a global pandemic.

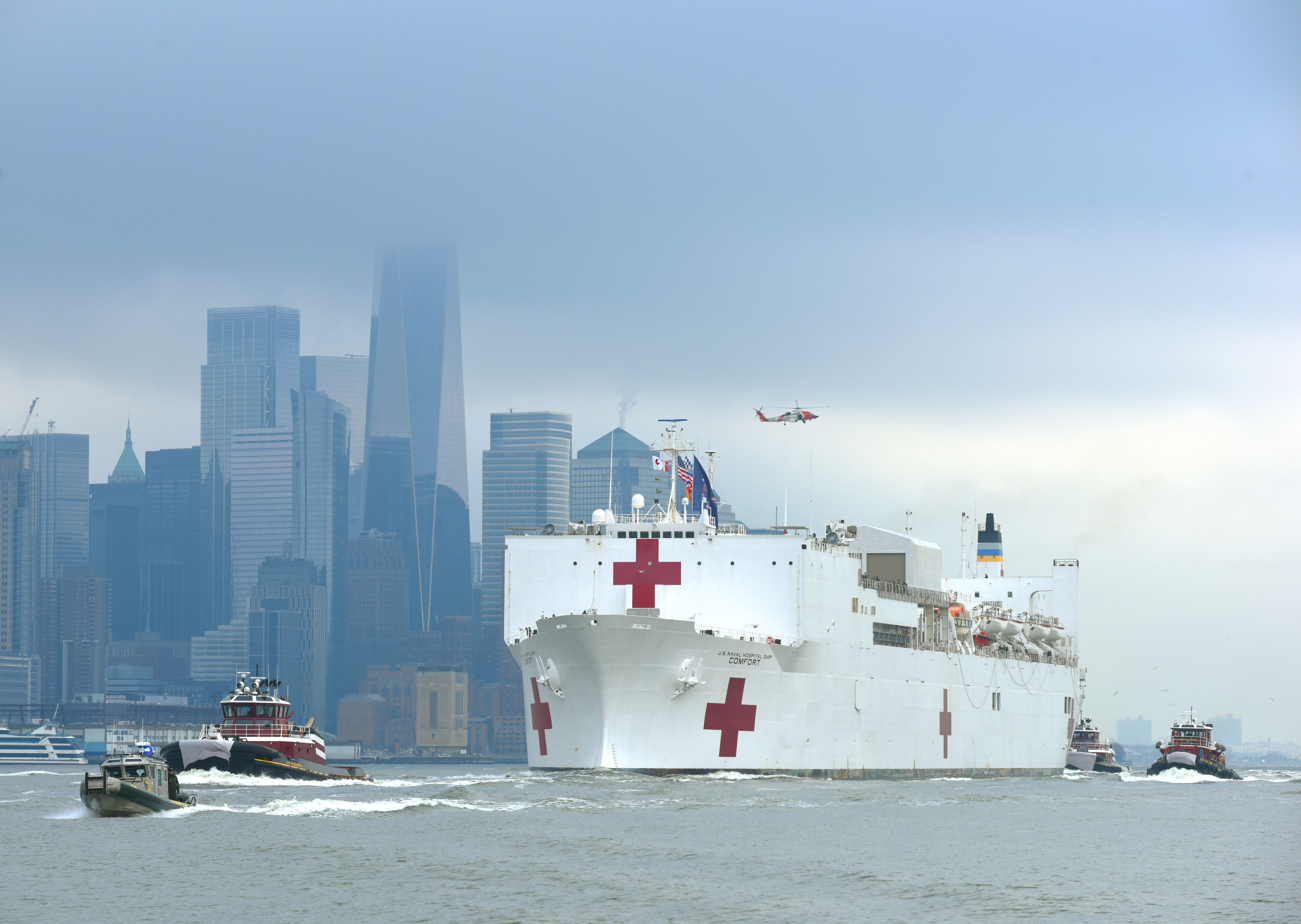
USNS Comfort off Manhattan to help with the COVID-19 pandemic in New York City, 2020

- March 13, 2020 – President Trump declares a national emergency in response to the COVID-19 pandemic, freeing up $50 billion in disaster relief funds.
- March 16, 2020 – The Dow Jones falls by −2,997.10, the single largest point drop in history and the second largest percentage drop ever at −12.93%, a larger crash than the Wall Street Crash of 1929. Most schools are also closed by this date.
- March 18, 2020 – President Trump signs the Families First Coronavirus Response Act into law and announces he will invoke the Defense Production Act to improve U.S. medical resources as well as directing the Housing and Urban Development Department (HUD) to suspend evictions and foreclosures of federal housing until the end of April.
- March 24, 2020 – The U.S. box office records zero revenue for the first time ever.
- March 26, 2020 – The Trump administration indicts Venezuelan president Nicolás Maduro's government of drug trafficking and narcoterrorism and offers a $15 million reward for information leading to Maduro's arrest.
- March 27, 2020 – President Trump signs the CARES Act in response to the COVID-19 pandemic.
- April 8, 2020 – Senator Bernie Sanders suspends his presidential campaign, leaving Joe Biden as the presumptive Democratic nominee.
- April 11, 2020 – The U.S. becomes the country with the highest number of reported COVID-19 deaths: over 20,000, overtaking Italy.
- April 14, 2020 – President Trump announces that he will suspend U.S. funding of the World Health Organization (WHO) pending an investigation into its early response to the outbreak.
- April 15, 2020 – Michigan governor Gretchen Whitmer faces two federal lawsuits accusing her of violating constitutional rights during the state's containment efforts. Thousands of people attend a protest in Lansing as anti-lockdown sentiment spreads.
- April 16, 2020 – It is revealed that nearly 22 million Americans have filed for unemployment within a single month due to COVID-19 lockdowns, the worst unemployment crisis since the Great Depression.
- April 21, 2020 – Oil prices reach a record low, falling into negative values, due to the ongoing COVID-19 pandemic and the Russia–Saudi Arabia oil price war.
- April 27, 2020 – The US Pentagon releases three UFO videos.
- April 30, 2020 – Armed protesters enter the Michigan State Capitol building to demand an end to lockdown measures.
- May 15, 2020 – The Trump administration formally announces Operation Warp Speed, a public–private partnership for accelerating the development of a COVID-19 vaccine.
- May 25, 2020 – George Floyd, an African-American man living in Minneapolis, dies by asphyxiation after police officer Derek Chauvin knelt on Floyd's neck and back for over nine minutes. This occurred during an arrest in which Floyd was suspected of using a counterfeit twenty-dollar bill. Chauvin was arrested for murder and multiple demonstrations against police brutality occurred globally.
- August 28, 2020 – Actor Chadwick Boseman dies from colon cancer.
- May 27, 2020 – The official nationwide COVID-19 death toll surpasses 100,000—more Americans than were killed in the Vietnam and Korean wars combined, and approaching that of the First World War, when more than 116,000 Americans died in combat.
- September 18, 2020 – Supreme Court Justice Ruth Bader Ginsburg dies.
- October 2, 2020 – President Donald Trump and First Lady Melania Trump are diagnosed with COVID-19. The former is taken to Walter Reed hospital.
- October 8, 2020 – The FBI announces that thirteen men have been arrested for plotting to kidnap Gretchen Whitmer.
- October 10, 2020 – Lee Keltner, a navy veteran and custom western hat maker, was shot following a "patriot rally" in Denver.
- October 31, 2020 - Most protest-related deaths this year involved shootings, with many incidents stemming from confrontations at protests that escalated fatally when at least one participant was armed.
- November 3, 2020 – 2020 United States presidential election
- November 7, 2020 – Four days after election day, Joe Biden is elected president; Kamala Harris is elected vice president.

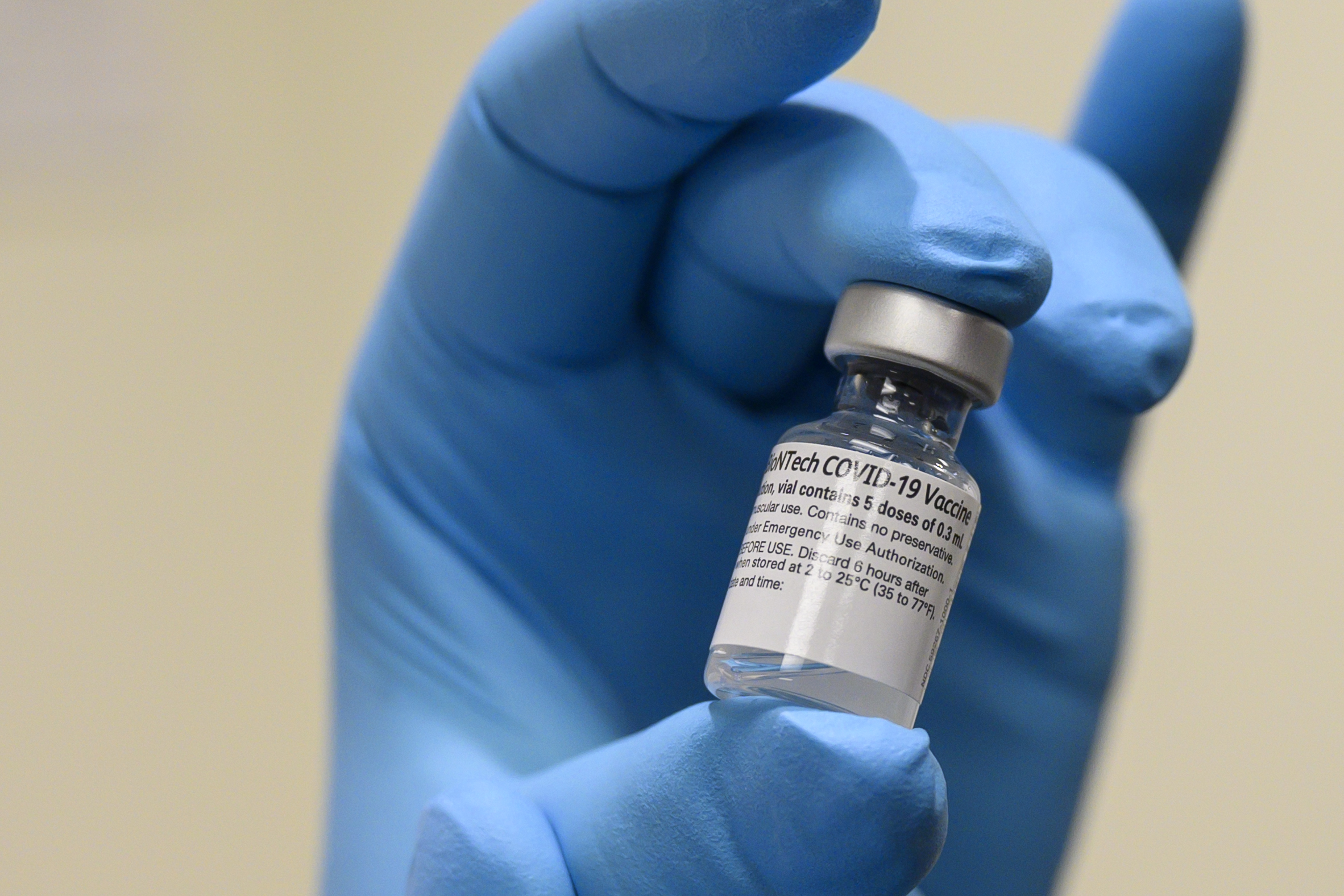
Pfizer–BioNTech COVID-19 vaccine

- December 14, 2020 – The first doses of the Pfizer COVID-19 vaccine are given out in the United States.
- January 6, 2021 – Trump-supporting rioters storm the United States Capitol, forcing Congress to evacuate and interrupting the Electoral College vote count that certified Joe Biden's victory.
- January 13, 2021 – Trump becomes the only president to be impeached for a second time. Ten Republicans join all Senate Democrats in voting to impeach Trump.

=== Presidency of Joe Biden ===
- January 20, 2021 – Biden becomes the 46th president and Harris becomes the 49th vice president. Harris is the first woman to hold her office.
  - President Biden signs his first executive orders reversing several Trump administration actions, including rejoining the Paris Agreement and the World Health Organization, repealing the 2017 travel bans, ending funding for the United States–Mexico border wall, and revoking the permit for the Keystone XL pipeline.
- February 13, 2021 – Donald Trump is acquitted by the Senate in his second impeachment trial. Seven Republicans joined Democrats in voting to convict Trump.
- February 13–17 – A major winter storm kills 58 people in the United States (and 12 in Mexico) and causes over 9,724,000 power outages across 13 states in the Midwest and Southwest, with Southwest Power Pool declaring an "energy emergency".
- February 15 – House Speaker Nancy Pelosi announces that Congress will establish a 9/11-styled commission to investigate the January 6 riot at the United States Capitol.
- March 7, 2021 – Floods in Hawaii leave one missing, destroy six homes, force evacuations, and leave 1,300 without electricity.
- March 11, 2021 – American Rescue Plan Act of 2021 is passed.
- March 16, 2021 – A spa shooting in Atlanta leaves 8 dead; 6 of the victims were of Asian descent.
- March 22, 2021 – Ten people are killed in a mass shooting at a King Soopers location in Boulder, Colorado. This is the second mass shooting with at least 8 dead in a week.
- March 31, 2021 – Four people are killed and two others, including the suspect, are injured in a shooting at an office building in Orange, California.
- April 2, 2021 – The Capitol Building in Washington, D.C. is placed under lockdown after a suspect rams a car into a barricade on Constitution Avenue and exits the vehicle holding a knife. Two police officers are injured in the attack and taken to a hospital, where one dies from his injuries. The suspect is killed by Capitol Police.
- April 2021 – January 2022 – Arizona's Maricopa County conducts an audit of the 2020 presidential election ballots, claiming election fraud.
- April 7, 2021 – Six people are killed by gunshots at a house in Rock Hill, South Carolina. The shooter, former NFL cornerback Phillip Adams, later committed suicide.
- April 15, 2021 – Nine people are killed, including the shooter, and seven injured, in a mass shooting at a FedEx facility in Indianapolis.
- May 9, 2021 – Seven people are shot dead at a birthday party in Colorado Springs, Colorado.
- May 26, 2021 – A mass shooting occurs at a Santa Clara Valley Transportation Authority rail yard in San Jose, California, leaving ten people dead, including the gunman, who committed suicide.
- June 17, 2021 – Juneteenth National Independence Day Act is passed, making Juneteenth a federal holiday.
- June 24, 2021 – A condominium in Miami collapses, killing ninety-eight people and injuring eleven others.
- August 10, 2021 – New York Governor Andrew Cuomo announces he will resign effective August 24 after an inquiry found he sexually harassed multiple women.

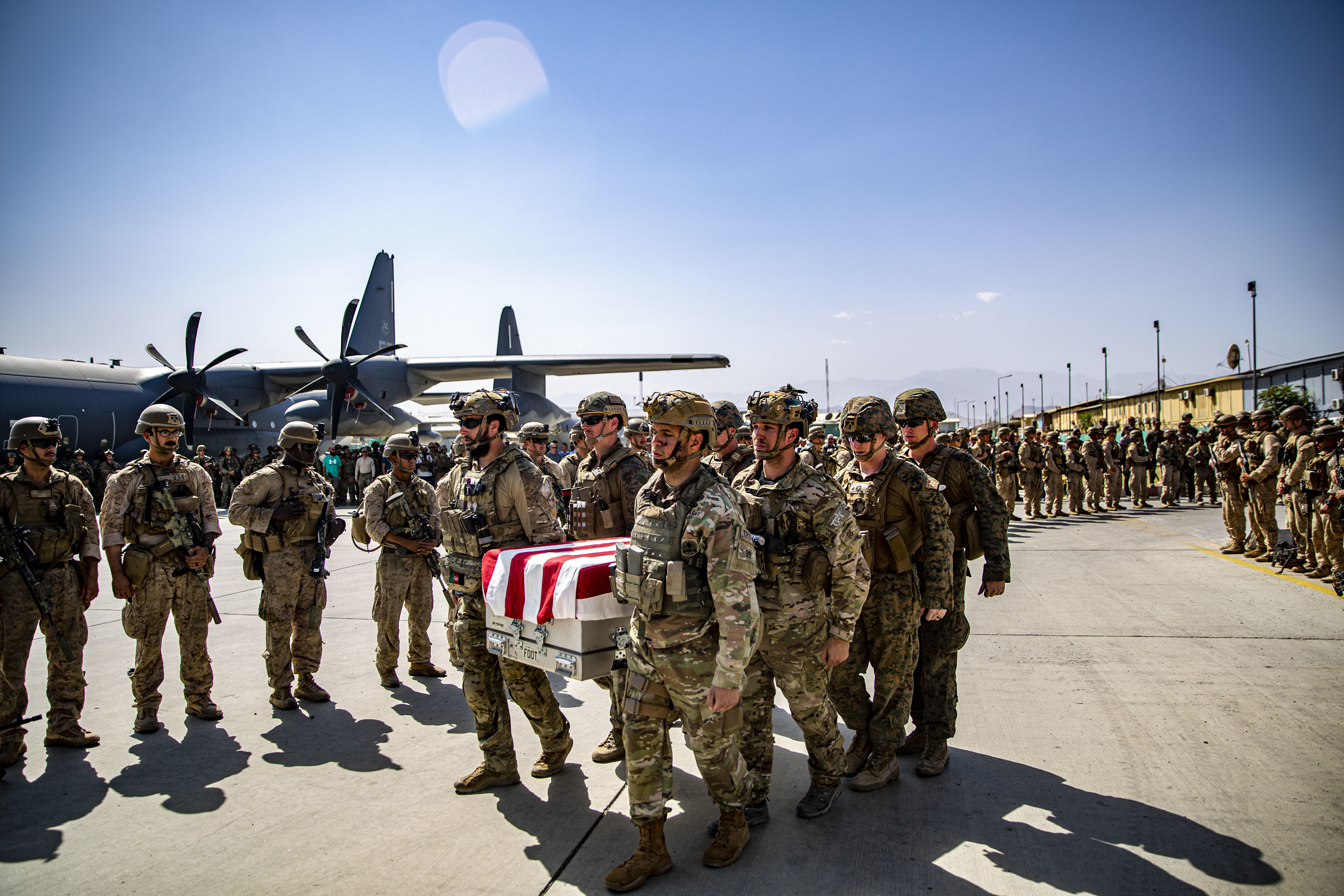
Military personnel carrying the remains of service members killed in the Kabul Airport attack, during the 2021 withdrawal from Afghanistan

- August 30, 2021 – The United States withdraws its remaining troops from Afghanistan, ending its 20-year involvement in the War in Afghanistan.
- October 13, 2021 – Star Trek actor William Shatner becomes the oldest person to go into space, at age 90, on board the Blue Origin NS-18, launched from Texas.
- November 5, 2021 – A crowd crush during a Travis Scott concert at the Astroworld Festival in Houston kills ten people and injures more than 300.
- November 15, 2021 – The Infrastructure Investment and Jobs Act is signed into law.
- November 17, 2021 – The U.S. House of Representatives votes 223–207 to censure Rep. Paul Gosar (R–AZ) after he posted a photo-shopped anime clip of him killing Rep. Alexandria Ocasio-Cortez (D–NY) and threatening President Biden, making him the first lawmaker to be censured since Charlie Rangel in 2010.
- November 30, 2021 – Four students are killed and seven other people are injured in a mass shooting at Oxford High School in Oxford Township, Michigan.
- December 10, 2021 – A late season tornado outbreak occurs in the Southern and Midwestern United States, causing major damage and killing at least 94 people.
- December 29, 2021 – British socialite Ghislaine Maxwell is convicted in a federal court on five of six charges relating to her recruiting and trafficking young girls to be sexually abused by the late financier Jeffrey Epstein.
- May 24, 2022 – A school shooting in Uvalde, Texas kills 19 students and two teachers.
- June 24, 2022 – Roe v. Wade is overturned by the Supreme Court.
- November 2022 – In the 2022 United States elections, the Republicans retake the House while the Democrats keep the Senate.
- January 2023 – Kevin McCarthy is elected Speaker of the House of Representatives on the fifteenth ballot.
- March, April 2023 – Former president Donald Trump is indicted and arraigned. He pleads not guilty on 34 counts of falsifying business records.
- August, 2023 - Wildfires in Hawaii kill over 100 and caused $5.5 billion in damages.
- October 3, 2023 – McCarthy becomes the first Speaker of the United States House of Representatives to be removed from office.
- October 25, 2023 – Mike Johnson elected Speaker.
- October 2023–present – Over 115 attacks occur on U.S. military bases in Iraq and Syria.
- March 26, 2024 – The Francis Scott Key Bridge in Baltimore, Maryland collapses, killing 6 construction workers.
- July 7–11, 2024 – Hurricane Beryl makes landfall in Texas, causing at least $6 billion (2024 USD) in damage to the state, before continuing across the central United States, where it produced a large and significant tornado outbreak consisting of 68 tornadoes. At least 48 deaths occurred in the United States as a result of Beryl.
- July 13, 2024 – While campaigning for the 2024 U.S. presidential election, former President of the United States Donald Trump is injured in an assassination attempt at a rally he held near Butler, Pennsylvania.
- July 13–16, 2024 – An intense sequence of severe weather outbreaks affected much of the Midwestern and Northeastern United States, producing two significant derechoes that each had wind gusts exceeding 100 mph (160 km/h), as well as multiple tornado outbreaks that produced a combined 90 tornadoes.
- July 21, 2024 – Incumbent President Joe Biden withdraws from the 2024 United States presidential election, endorsing Vice President Kamala Harris to replace him as the Democratic nominee.
- September 2024 – Hurricane Helene causes devastation in the Southeastern United States, killing over 230.
- October 2024 – Hurricane Milton strikes Florida, killing at least 24.
- November 2024 – The 2024 United States elections result in a Government trifecta for the Republicans. In the presidential race, Donald Trump and JD Vance defeated Kamala Harris and Tim Walz. In Congress, the Republicans gain control of the United States Senate and retain control of the United States House of Representatives.
- December 4, 2024 – Brian Thompson, CEO of UnitedHealthCare, was shot and killed outside the New York Hilton Midtown in New York City. Alleged killer Luigi Mangione was arrested five days later in Altoona, Pennsylvania and was charged with the murder of Thompson.
- December 29, 2024 – Jimmy Carter, president of the United States from 1977 to 1981, dies at the age of 100 in Plains, Georgia. He was the only centenarian president.
- January 1, 2025 – A truck attack kills 15 people in New Orleans, Louisiana. A separate incident occurred on the same day in Paradise, Nevada after a Cybertruck exploded at the entrance of Trump International Hotel Las Vegas, killing the perpetrator.

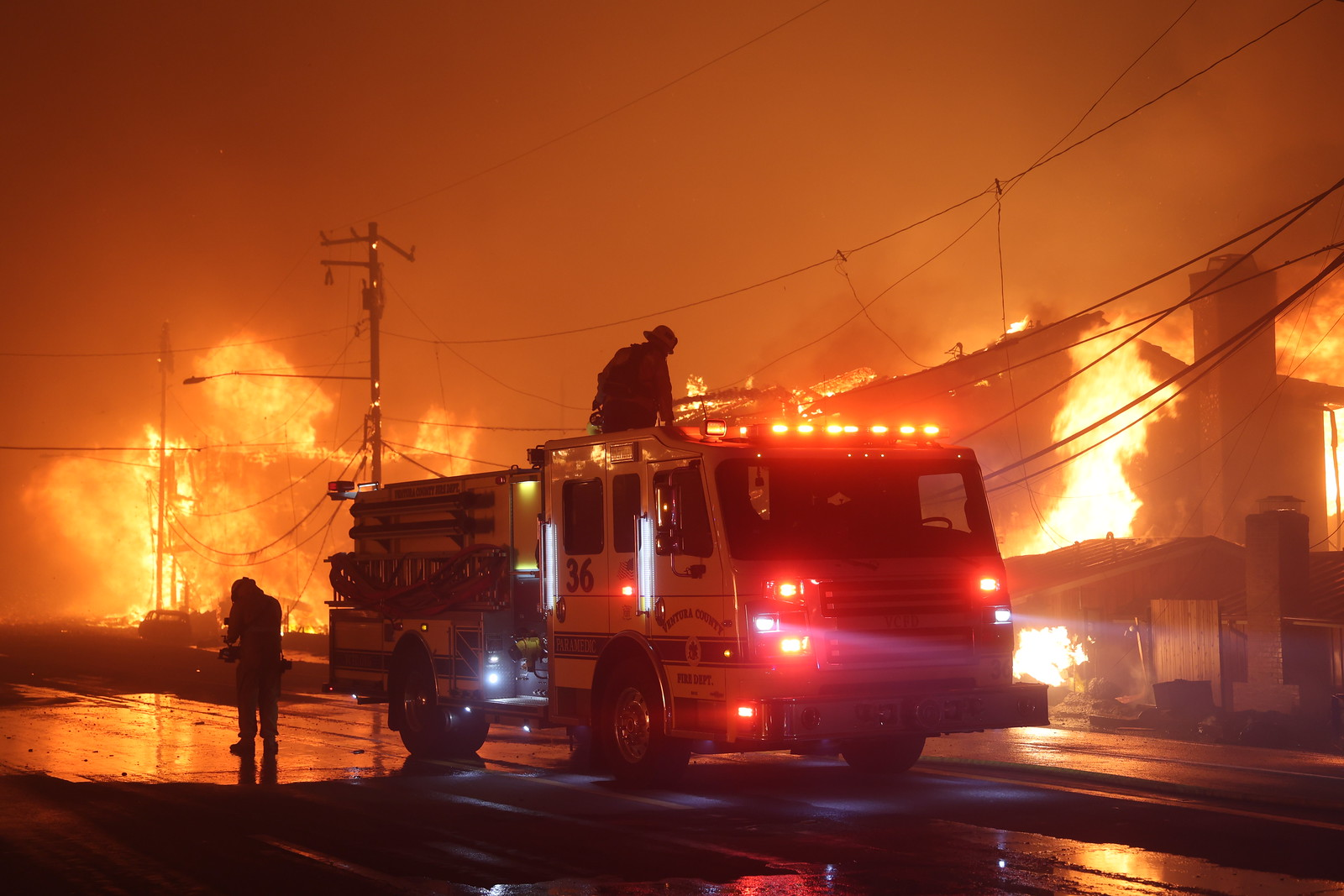
Firefighters trying to extinguish the Palisades Fire during the 2025 Los Angeles area wildfires

- January 2025 – Wildfires in Southern California killed at least 24 people, forced nearly 180,000 to evacuate, and destroyed or damaged more than 10,000 structures in the Los Angeles area.
- January 18, 2025 – Social media company TikTok, which has 170 million users in the United States, goes offline in the United States before a law banning the platform would take effect. TikTok services were restored the next day.

=== Second presidency of Donald Trump ===
- January 20, 2025 – Donald Trump is inaugurated as the 47th President of the United States, and JD Vance becomes the 50th Vice President of the United States. Trump signs a number of executive orders which withdrew from the Paris Climate Accords, established the Department of Government Efficiency, pardoned January 6th defendants, delayed the TikTok ban, and attempted to end birthright citizenship, among other things.
- January 2025 – The Trump Administration begins mass immigration enforcement raids and deportations against undocumented immigrants. U.S. Immigration and Customs Enforcement raids have caused fear in immigrant populations. Detentions of pro-Palestinian academic activists have also occurred.
- January 29, 2025 – American Eagle Flight 5342 collides with a U.S. Army Sikorsky UH-60 Black Hawk over the Potomac River in Washington, D.C. near Reagan National Airport, killing all people on both aircraft, including U.S. Figure Skating athletes. It was the deadliest U.S. air disaster in nearly a quarter century.
- January 31, 2025 – Med Jets Flight 056 crashed in Northeast Philadelphia, Pennsylvania, killing 7 people including everyone on board and one person on the ground. The flight injured at least 22 people.
- February 1, 2025 – The United States enters a trade war with Canada and Mexico after Donald Trump signed tariffs on the two nations as well as China. Mexico and Canada claims this action violates the United States–Mexico–Canada Agreement.
- February 2025 – Thousands of federal workers in the U.S. government's bureaucracy are fired by the Trump administration and its Department of Government Efficiency, led by Elon Musk. Agencies, such as the National Nuclear Security Administration, the United States Department of Transportation, USAID, and the National Park Service, among others, are affected.
- February 22, 2025 – A mass shooting and hostage situation occurs at the UPMC Memorial Hospital in Shiloh, Pennsylvania. Two people, the shooter and a police officer, were killed and five were injured.
- February 28, 2025 – Donald Trump and JD Vance get into an argument with Ukrainian president Volodymyr Zelenskyy at the White House over U.S. support for Ukraine. This occurs after the U.S. sided with Russia in a United Nations resolution that condemned Russian aggression against Ukraine.
- March 11, 2025 – Information regarding military operations in Yemen were leaked after Jeffrey Goldberg, an editor from The Atlantic, was accidentally added into a Signal group chat with senior government officials.
- March 15, 2025 – Kilmar Abrego Garcia, a Salvadoran national residing in Maryland, is unlawfully deported by the Trump administration via an "administrative error." Garcia was imprisoned without trial at the Terrorism Confinement Center maximum security prison in El Salvador. Despite court orders to "facilitate and effectuate" his return, the Trump administration and Salvadoran president Nayib Bukele initially refused to do so. Garcia was returned to the United States in June to face criminal charges.
- March 15, 2025 – Over 53 people are killed after the U.S. military launched large-scale air and naval attacks against Houthis in Yemen.
- March 31, 2025 – Senator Cory Booker of New Jersey delivered a 25 hour long speech in the U.S. Senate to protest the policies of Donald Trump and Elon Musk. It surpassed Strom Thurmond's filibuster of the Civil Rights Act of 1957 to become the longest speech in Senate history.
- April 1, 2025 – Susan M. Crawford defeated Brad Schimel in the 2025 Wisconsin Supreme Court election, which became the most expensive judicial race in U.S. history.
- April 2, 2025 – Donald Trump announced a 10% universal import duty on all goods brought into the U.S. and even higher rates for certain trading partners as a part of his protectionist tariff policies.
- April 17, 2025 – A shooting at Florida State University kills 2 and injures 6.
- May 8, 2025 – Following the 2025 papal conclave, Pope Leo XIV (born Robert Francis Prevost) of Chicago, Illinois, became the first pope born in the United States.
- May 15, 2025 – 27 people are killed in a tornado outbreak that impacted the Midwestern and Southeastern United States.
- May 21, 2025 – 2 Israeli embassy staff members are shot and killed outside the Lillian & Albert Small Capital Jewish Museum in Washington, D.C.

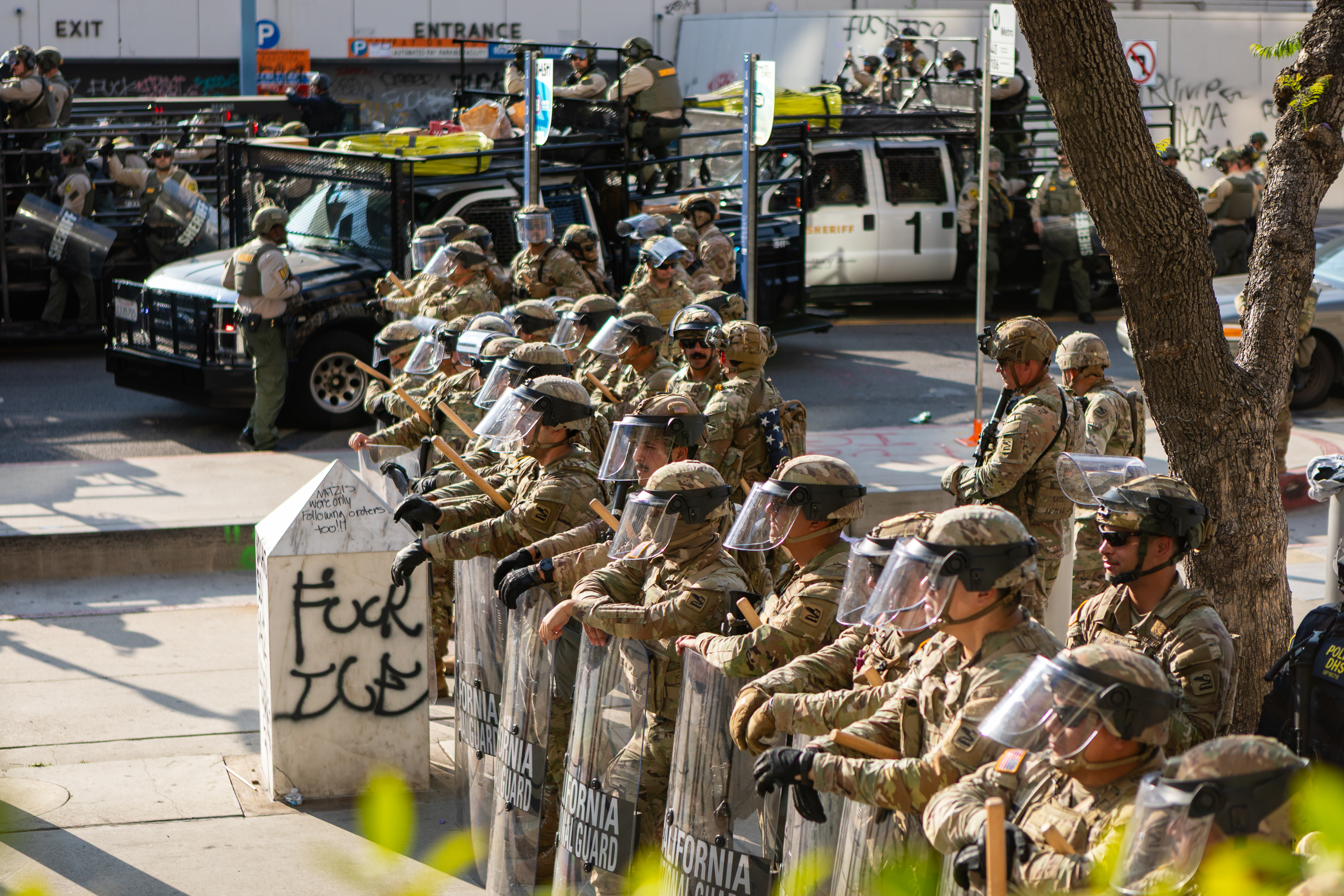
The California National Guard and Los Angeles County Sheriff's Department responding to demonstrations against Immigration and Customs Enforcement activity in the Los Angeles area, June 2025

- June 2025 – Demonstrations against Donald Trump's immigration policies erupt in Los Angeles, California, along with other demonstrations (including the No Kings protests) across the country. To quell the demonstrations in Los Angeles, Trump deployed U.S. Marines to the city and federalized the California National Guard, against California governor Gavin Newsom's wishes.
- June 14, 2025 – Minnesota legislator Melissa Hortman and her spouse are assassinated in what law-enforcement believe is an anti-abortion motivated attack. Another legislator, John Hoffman and his spouse, were also targeted, but survived.
- June 21, 2025 – The U.S. enters the Twelve-Day War following strikes on three Iranian nuclear sites.
- June 29, 2025 – Two firefighters are killed in an ambush while responding to a brush fire in Coeur d'Alene, Idaho.
- July 3, 2025 – The United States Congress narrowly passes the One Big Beautiful Bill Act. President Trump signs it into law the next day.
- July 4–7, 2025 – Floods in the Texas Hill Country of Central Texas kill over 100.
- July 7, 2025 – The U.S. Department of Justice releases a memo claiming that the Epstein files do not exist, creating division among the Trump's political base.
- July 28, 2025 – 3 people are killed and 7 injured in mass shooting at the Grand Sierra Resort in Reno, Nevada. Later in the day, a separate mass shooting in the Midtown Manhattan neighborhood of New York City kills 4 and injures 1.
- August 11, 2025 – President Trump invokes the District of Columbia Home Rule Act using dubious claims about crime in Washington, D.C. to take over the District of Columbia Metropolitan Police Department and deploy the District of Columbia National Guard and federal law enforcement to the District.
- August 20, 2025 – The Texas State House passes a new congressional map which gives Republicans an advantage in the 2026 United States House of Representatives elections. This action initiated a wave of redistricting by both parties in several states to give themselves an advantage in the 2026 midterms through gerrymandering.
- August 27, 2025 – A shooting at the Church of the Annunciation in Minneapolis, Minnesota leaves three dead and twenty-three injured.
- September 1, 2025 – The U.S. Navy begins military strikes on alleged drug traffickers in the Pacific Ocean and Caribbean Sea, killing at least 87 in what has been described as extrajudicial killings that violate international law.
- September 10, 2025 – Conservative political commentator Charlie Kirk is assassinated at a Turning Point USA event at Utah Valley University in Orem, Utah.
- October 1, 2025 – The U.S. Federal Government enters a shutdown after Congress failed to pass appropriations legislation. On November 5th, it became the longest shutdown in U.S. history. Eight senate Democrats joined Republicans in passing an agreement to end the shutdown on November 9th, and the House voted to end the shutdown on November 12th.
- October 10, 2025 – An explosion at a munitions factory in Humphreys County, Tennessee kills 16.
- November 4, 2025 – The November 2025 United States elections result in what has been described as "blue wave" for the Democrats, with them winning gubernatorial races in Virginia and New Jersey. In New York City, Democrat Zohran Mamdani wins the city's mayoral race and the Democrats win several downballot races in Georgia and Pennsylvania. The Democrats also pass Proposition 50 in California, which will allow them to redistrict the state's congressional districts.
- November 4, 2025 – UPS Airlines Flight 2976 crashes near Louisville Muhammad Ali International Airport in Louisville, Kentucky, killing at least 12.
- November 12, 2025 – The last Penny is minted by the Philadelphia Mint after more than two centuries of circulation.
- November 19, 2025 – The Epstein Files Transparency Act is signed into law by President Trump, which requires that all files relating to Jeffrey Epstein be released.
- November 26, 2025 – Two members of the West Virginia National Guard, who were deployed to Washington, D.C., were shot near Farragut West Station.
- December 19, 2025 – Portions of the Epstein Files are released by the U.S. Department of Justice as a result of the deadline set by the Epstein Files Transparency Act. The release has been highly criticized for heavy redactions and multiple unreleased documents.
- January 3, 2026 – The U.S. Armed Forces launches strikes on Venezuela and captures Venezuelan president Nicolás Maduro.
- January 2026 – Federal law enforcement conduct Operation Metro Surge with the purpose of apprehending undocumented immigrants in the Twin Cities area of Minnesota. The operations result in the killings of U.S. citizens Renée Good and Alex Pretti, anti-ICE demonstrations, and the disruption of everyday life in Minnesota.
- January 2026 – At least 88 people are killed as a major winter storm encompasses North America, including the Northeastern and Southern United States.
- January 19, 2026 – A sewage spill releases over 240 million gallons of untreated wastewater into the Potomac River in one of the largest sewage spills in U.S. history.
- January 22, 2026 – The United States officially withdraws from the World Health Organization.
- February 5, 2026 – New START, a nuclear arms reduction treaty between the United States and Russia, officially expires.
- February 14, 2026 – A partial government shutdown, impacting the Department of Homeland Security, begins. The shutdown sees major disruptions at U.S. airports.
- February 20, 2026 – The Supreme Court's ruling in Learning Resources, Inc. v. Trump vacates many of the tariffs implemented by Donald Trump under the International Emergency Economic Powers Act, which are quickly replaced with new tariffs under Section 122 of the Trade Act of 1974.

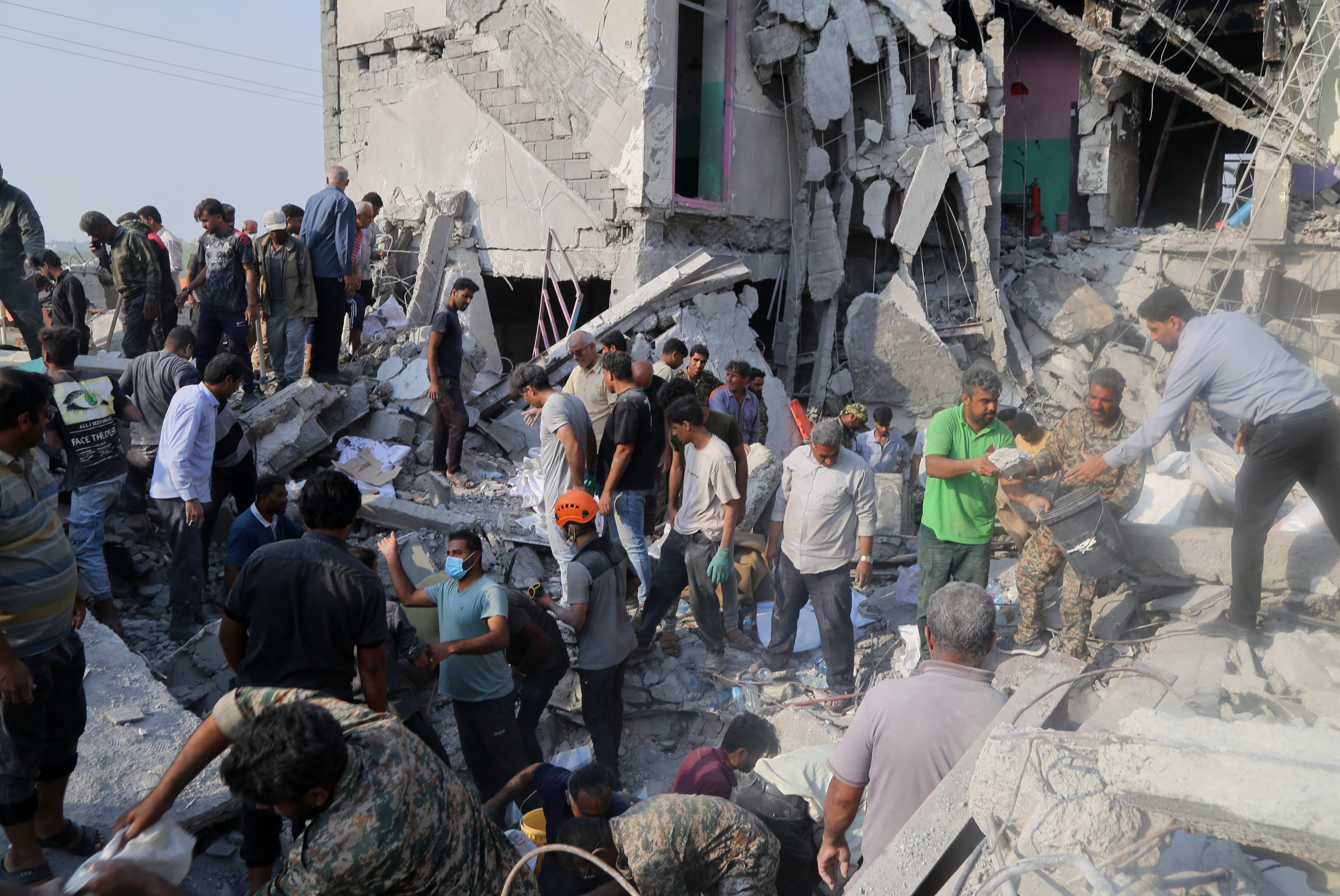
The ruins of an Iranian girls' school destroyed by U.S. forces at the start of the Iran war

- February 28, 2026 – The U.S. and Israel launch strikes on Iran, killing Iranian supreme leader Ali Khamenei, and starting a war against Iran.
- April 1, 2026 – Artemis II is launched by NASA, becoming the first crewed mission past low Earth orbit since the Apollo program.
- April 25, 2026 – A shooting occurs at the 2026 White House Correspondent's Dinner. One officer was shot in the bullet-resistant vest while President Trump was left unharmed.
- May 2, 2026 – American low-cost carrier Spirit Airlines ceases operations after entering Chapter 11 bankrupcy.
- May 21, 2026 – 50,000 people are placed in an evacuation order after a chemical leak occurs in Orange County, California.
- June 11, 2026 – The 2026 FIFA World Cup, hosted by the U.S., Canada, and Mexico, opens.
- June 12, 2026 – Elon Musk becomes the first US-dollar trillionaire in U.S. and world history.
- November 3, 2026 – In the 2026 Midterm elections, Democrats take control of the U.S. Senate, the U.S. House Of Representatives, and several gubernatorial races in what has been described as a "blue tsunami."
- November 12, 2026 – Jensen Huang resigns as CEO of Nvidia over allegations of engaging in extramarital affairs, including one with a suspected Chinese spy.
- November 13, 2026 – The FAA issues a nationwide ground stop due to a communication outage, resulting in flight delays and cancellations nationwide.

== See also ==
- History of the United States (1991–2016)
- History of the United States (2016–present)
