= List of colleges and universities censured by the American Association of University Professors =

This page includes colleges and universities that are currently censured by the American Association of University Professors, alleging "unsatisfactory conditions of academic freedom and tenure have been found to prevail at these institutions".

== History ==
In 1930, the University of Mississippi, Mississippi State University and Mississippi University for Women, were placed on a list of "non-recommended" institutions, after Mississippi Governor Theodore Bilbo, a member of the second Ku Klux Klan, fired the presidents of all three institutions as well as 179 faculty members.

The "censure list" was officially created in 1938. Between that year and 2002, 183 colleges and universities were placed on the list at various times.

As of 2025, there are 58 institutions currently on AAUP's censure list:

Institution	Location	Affiliation	Type	Year Censured
Alaska Pacific University	Alaska	United Methodist Church	university	1996
American International College	Massachusetts	Private	university	1983
Baltimore City Community College	Maryland	Public	community college	1992
Benedict College	South Carolina	Baptist (American Baptist Churches USA)	historically black college	1994
Bennington College	Vermont	Private	liberal arts college	1995
Bethune-Cookman University	Florida	United Methodist Church	HBCU university	2011
Brigham Young University	Utah	LDS Church	research university	1998
Catholic University of America	District of Columbia	Roman Catholic	research university	1990
Cedarville University	Ohio	Baptist (Southern Baptist Convention)	university	2009
Charleston Southern University	South Carolina	Baptist (Southern Baptist Convention)	university	2001
Clark Atlanta University	Georgia	United Methodist Church	HBCU research university	2010
Collin College	Texas	Public	community college	2023
Community College of Aurora	Colorado	Public	community college	2017
Concordia Seminary	Missouri	Lutheran Church–Missouri Synod	seminary	1975
Dean College	Massachusetts	Private	college	1992
Emporia State University	Kansas	Public	university	2023
Felician University	New Jersey	Roman Catholic	university	2015
Frank Phillips College	Texas	Public	community college	1969
Hillsdale College	Michigan	Christian (formerly Free Will Baptist)	liberal arts college	1988
Husson University	Maine	Private	university	1987
Indiana University Northwest	Indiana	Public	university	2023
Johnson & Wales University	Rhode Island	Private	university	1999
Lawrence Technological University	Michigan	Private	university	1998
Linfield University	Oregon	Private	liberal arts college	2022
Loma Linda University	California	Seventh-day Adventist	health sciences university	1992
Louisiana State University	Louisiana	Public	land-grant research university	2012
Meharry Medical College	Tennessee	United Methodist Church	HBCU medical school	2005
Minneapolis College of Art and Design	Minnesota	Private	art school	1997
Muhlenberg College	Pennsylvania	Lutheran (Evangelical Lutheran Church in America)	liberal arts college	2025
Murray State University	Kentucky	Public	university	1976
National Louis University	Illinois	Private	university	2013
National Park College	Arkansas	Public	community college	1996
Nicholls State University	Louisiana	Public	university	2009
Nichols College	Massachusetts	Private	business college	1980
North Greenville University	South Carolina	Baptist (Southern Baptist Convention)	college	1993
North Idaho College	Idaho	Public	community college	2009
Northeastern Illinois University	Illinois	Public	university	2014
Northwestern State University	Louisiana	Public	university	2012
Nunez Community College	Louisiana	Public	community college	2019
Pacific Lutheran University	Washington	Lutheran (Evangelical Lutheran Church in America)	university	2020
Pontifical Catholic University of Puerto Rico	Puerto Rico	Roman Catholic	university	1987
Saint Meinrad Seminary and School of Theology	Indiana	Roman Catholic	seminary	1997
Savannah College of Art and Design	Georgia	Private	art school	1993
Southeastern Baptist Theological Seminary	North Carolina	Baptist (Southern Baptist Convention)	seminary	1989
Southeastern Louisiana University	Louisiana	Public	university	2012
Southern University	Louisiana	Public	HBCU land-grant university	2013
Spalding University	Kentucky	Roman Catholic	university	2017
State University of New York	New York	Public	system of public colleges and universities	1978
Talladega College	Alabama	United Church of Christ	historically black college	1986
University of Bridgeport	Connecticut	Private	university	1994
University of Dubuque	Iowa	Presbyterian	university	2002
University of Missouri	Missouri	Public	land-grant research university	2016
University of Southern Maine	Maine	Public	university	2015
University of Texas MD Anderson Cancer Center	Texas	Public	comprehensive cancer center	2015
University of Texas Medical Branch	Texas	Public	academic health science center	2010
University of the Cumberlands	Kentucky	Christian (formerly Southern Baptist Convention)	university	2005
University of the District of Columbia	District of Columbia	Public	HBCU land-grant university	1998
University System of Georgia	Georgia	Public	government agency	2022
Virginia State University	Virginia	Public	HBCU land-grant university	2005

== See also ==
- List of colleges and universities sanctioned by the American Association of University Professors
