= Gardner Williams (American football) =

American football player (born 1961)

No. 40
- Position: Defensive back

Personal information
- Born: December 11, 1961 (age 64); Washington, D.C., U.S.
- Listed height: 6 ft 2 in (1.88 m)
- Listed weight: 199 lb (90 kg)

Career information
- High school: Bishop O'Dowd (Oakland, California)
- College: Saint Mary's
- NFL draft: 1984: 11th round, 282nd overall pick

Career history
- Los Angeles Raiders (1984)*; Detroit Lions (1984); San Francisco 49ers (1985)*; Los Angeles Raiders (1986)
- * Offseason or practice squad member only
- Stats at Pro Football Reference

Gardner Williams (born December 11, 1961) is an American former professional football defensive back who played for the Detroit Lions of the National Football League (NFL). He played college football for the Saint Mary's Gaels and was selected by the Los Angeles Raiders in the 11th round of the 1984 NFL draft.

== Early life ==
Gardner Williams was born on December 11, 1961, in Washington, D.C. He played high school football at Bishop O'Dowd High School in Oakland, California as a receiver and defensive back. As a senior in 1979, he earned All-Catholic Athletic League honors on offense.

== College career ==
Williams did not receive any scholarship offers to play college football. He played for the Gaels of Saint Mary's College of California from 1980 to 1983. He posted 50 tackles, two interceptions, and eight pass breakups his senior year.

== Professional career ==
Williams was selected by the Los Angeles Raiders in the 11th round, with the 282th overall pick, of the 1984 NFL draft. He signed with the team on June 13, 1984, and was released on August 27, 1984.

Williams signed with the Detroit Lions on October 14, 1984. He played in three games for the Lions as a reserve cornerback/safety before being released on November 9, 1984.

Williams was signed by the San Francisco 49ers on April 16, 1985. He was released on August 12, 1985.

Williams signed with the Raiders again on March 10, 1986. On August 18, he was placed on injured reserve, where he spent the entire 1986 season. He was later released on August 19, 1987.

== Personal life ==
Williams' father, Howie Williams, also spent time with the Raiders and wore the same jersey number (#29).
