= Ralph Coleman (American football) =

American football player (born 1950)

No. 86
- Position: Linebacker

Personal information
- Born: August 31, 1950 (age 76); Spartanburg, South Carolina, U.S.
- Listed height: 6 ft 4 in (1.93 m)
- Listed weight: 216 lb (98 kg)

Career information
- High school: Carver (Spartanburg)
- College: North Carolina A&T
- NFL draft: 1972: 8th round, 208th overall pick

Career history
- Dallas Cowboys (1972); Houston Oilers (1973)*; Tampa Bay Buccaneers (1976)*
- * Offseason or practice squad member only

Awards and highlights
- All-MEAC (1971)

Career NFL statistics
- Games played: 1
- Stats at Pro Football Reference

Ralph Donnell Coleman (born August 31, 1950) is an American former professional football player who was a linebacker in the National Football League (NFL) for the Dallas Cowboys. He played college football for the North Carolina A&T Aggies.

Coleman is currently serving a life sentence for the 1998 murder of a nightclub bouncer.

== Early life ==
Coleman attended Carver High School, where he was a part of the last graduating class, before the school merged with Spartanburg High School. He was a three-sport athlete (football, basketball and track). In 1967, as a two-way player (linebacker and offensive tackle), he helped his football team win a state championship.

He accepted a football scholarship from North Carolina A&T University to play defensive tackle. He was converted to linebacker and became a four-year starter. In 1968, he was a part of a team that finished the season 8–1 overall (6–1 in conference play) and won the black college football national championship.

== Professional career ==
=== Dallas Cowboys ===
Coleman was selected by the Dallas Cowboys in the eighth round (208th overall) of the 1972 NFL draft. The Cowboys saw great potential and he became the first African-American linebacker to make the team in franchise history.

He started the year in the taxi squad, before being promoted to the active roster after Chuck Howley was injured. He played mainly on special teams, including the playoffs.

After not agreeing with his playing time and contract numbers, he forced the team to trade him to the Houston Oilers in exchange for a conditional draft pick (not exercised) on July 13, 1973.

=== Houston Oilers ===
Coleman was waived by the Houston Oilers before the start of the 1973 season. In March 1974, he was selected by the Birmingham Americans in the 24th round (282nd overall) of the WFL Pro Draft.

=== Tampa Bay Buccaneers ===
On March 23, 1976, he was signed by the Tampa Bay Buccaneers as a free agent. He was released on July 12.

== Personal life ==
In 1988, he was first convicted of the murder of a Greenville nightclub bouncer and sentenced to life in prison. The state Supreme Court overturned that verdict and granted Coleman a new trial. In February 1990, the jury failed to reach a verdict in his second trial. In November 1990, he was convicted of murder in his third trial. Coleman is serving his life sentence for murder in a South Carolina state prison. He was a suspect in several other homicides in the state but not charged.

In 1993, he appeared in a film produced by the U.S. Department of Justice entitled "Hard Choices: Inside Looking Out". The film presents the story of two fictional teenagers confronted by the temptation of drug use, who are advised by two former professional athletes (Coleman and Alex English).
