= Phillip Adams (American football) =

American football player (1988–2021)

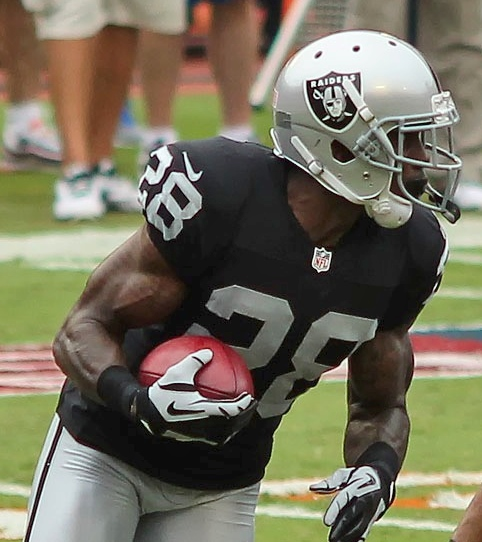
- Adams with the Oakland Raiders in 2012

No. 35, 26, 40, 28, 24, 20
- Position: Cornerback

Personal information
- Born: July 20, 1988; Rock Hill, South Carolina, U.S.
- Died: April 8, 2021 (aged 32); Rock Hill, South Carolina, U.S.
- Listed height: 5 ft 11 in (1.80 m)
- Listed weight: 195 lb (88 kg)

Career information
- High school: Rock Hill
- College: South Carolina State (2006–2009)
- NFL draft: 2010: 7th round, 224th overall pick

Career history
- San Francisco 49ers (2010); New England Patriots (2011); Seattle Seahawks (2011); Oakland Raiders (2012–2013); Seattle Seahawks (2014)*; New York Jets (2014); Atlanta Falcons (2015)
- * Offseason or practice squad member only

Awards and highlights
- First-team All-MEAC (2009)

Career NFL statistics
- Tackles: 128
- Pass deflections: 15
- Interceptions: 5
- Forced fumbles: 1
- Stats at Pro Football Reference

Phillip Matthew Adams (July 20, 1988 – April 8, 2021) was an American professional football player who was a cornerback in the National Football League (NFL). He played college football for the South Carolina State Bulldogs and was selected in the seventh round of the 2010 NFL draft by the San Francisco 49ers. He also played for the New England Patriots, Seattle Seahawks, Oakland Raiders, New York Jets, and Atlanta Falcons.

On April 7, 2021, Adams killed six people in Rock Hill, South Carolina. The next day, he shot and killed himself following a standoff with police. He was posthumously diagnosed as suffering from the brain disease chronic traumatic encephalopathy.

== Early life ==
Phillip Matthew Adams was born on July 20, 1988, in Rock Hill, South Carolina. He attended Rock Hill High School, where he played football and basketball.

== College career ==
Adams attended South Carolina State University from 2006 to 2009. In his freshman year with the Bulldogs, Adams saw action as a backup and on special teams. He recorded 12 tackles and two interceptions, along with a 30-yard punt return. As a sophomore with the Bulldogs, he played in 11 games.

As a junior, Adams ranked sixth on the team (with 48 tackles) and led the team in interceptions (with five) and pass deflections (with nine). In his senior year, he was a First Team All-Mid-Eastern Athletic Conference selection after registering 48 tackles and three interceptions. That year, he also scored a touchdown on a pick six against Norfolk State.

== Professional career ==
Pre-draft measurables
Height	Weight	40-yard dash	10-yard split	20-yard split	20-yard shuttle	Three-cone drill	Vertical jump	Broad jump
5 ft 10 3/4 in (1.80 m)	192 lb (87 kg)	4.50 s	1.62 s	2.57 s	4.34 s	7.16 s	34.5 in (0.88 m)	10 ft 4 in (3.15 m)
All values from South Carolina State's Pro Day

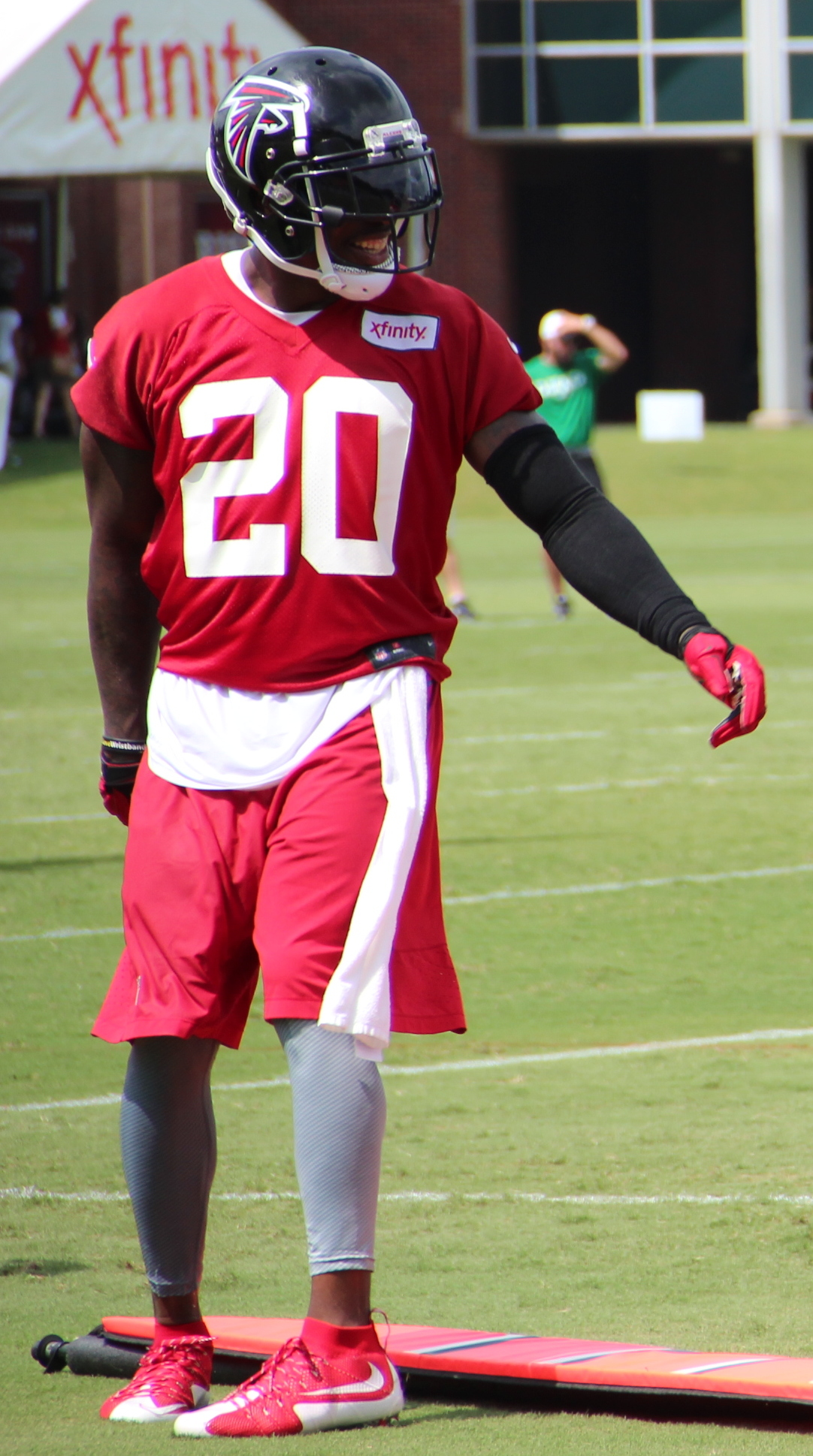
Adams at training camp with the Atlanta Falcons in 2015

Adams was selected in the seventh round (224th overall) of the 2010 NFL draft by the San Francisco 49ers. In week 16 against the St. Louis Rams on December 26, 2010, he broke his left ankle while blocking on the opening kickoff of the second half. The injury required Adams to have surgery, which included several screws being inserted into his leg. He was released by the 49ers on September 3, 2011.

On September 21, 2011, the New England Patriots signed Adams and Landon Cohen after season-ending injuries to Dan Koppen and Myron Pryor. He was waived on October 8, then re-signed on October 13 after Mike Wright went on injured reserve. On October 14, Adams was once again released to make room for Marcus Harrison, but was re-signed on October 18. On November 21, Adams recorded his first interception in the NFL. He was waived again on November 29.

On December 20, 2011, Adams was signed by the Seattle Seahawks. He made only one appearance for the Seahawks in 2011. On August 31, 2012, the Seahawks cut Adams.

On September 1, 2012, Adams was signed by the Oakland Raiders. Adams played in 15 of the Raiders' 16 games that year, with one interception (off of Peyton Manning) and 15 tackles. On December 28, 2012, he was placed on injured reserve. On March 12, 2013, he re-signed with the Raiders as a restricted free agent. Adams appeared in all 16 games for the Raiders in 2013, with 30 tackles and a fumble recovery on the year. In his time with the Raiders, he suffered two concussions over three games.

Adams signed with the Seahawks again on March 27, 2014. On August 30, 2014, he was released after continued struggles in training camp.

He was claimed off waivers by the New York Jets on September 1, 2014. In 2014 for the Jets, Adams had one interception and 24 tackles in 12 games for the team.

Adams was signed by the Atlanta Falcons on March 12, 2015. He played in 13 games for the Falcons in 2015, with one interception and 38 tackles. On April 5, 2016, Adams had a workout with the Kansas City Chiefs, but he did not return to the NFL. During training camp in 2016, the Indianapolis Colts called and asked Adams to participate in practice the following day, but Adams missed his flight. According to his former agent, "He made it to the Charlotte airport, but the flight had left already. I could tell his head was not in it. He'd given up on it."

== NFL career statistics ==
Year	Team	GP	Tackles				Fumbles			Interceptions					
Year	Team	GP	Cmb	Solo	Ast	Sck	FF	FR	Yds	Int	Yds	Avg	Lng	TD	PD
2010	SF	15	13	9	4	0.0	0	0	0	0	0	0.0	0	0	1
2011	NE	6	8	7	1	0.0	0	0	0	1	0	0.0	0	0	1
2011	SEA	1	0	0	0	0.0	0	0	0	0	0	0.0	0	0	0
2012	OAK	15	15	13	2	0.0	0	0	0	2	0	0.0	0	0	5
2013	OAK	16	30	26	4	0.0	0	1	26	0	0	0.0	0	0	1
2014	NYJ	12	24	21	3	0.0	0	0	0	1	0	0.0	0	0	3
2015	ATL	13	38	32	6	0.0	1	0	0	1	2	2.0	2	0	4
Total		78	128	108	20	0.0	1	1	26	5	2	0.4	2	0	15

== Shootings and death ==
External videos
- "Former N.F.L. Player Kills 5 in South Carolina", The New York Times, April 8, 2021

On April 7, 2021, Adams shot six people at a house in Rock Hill, South Carolina, killing five and fatally injuring a sixth who died on April 10. During a standoff with the police the next day, on April 8, Adams fatally shot himself, according to the York County Sheriff's Office. He was 32. Police said Adams' mother was inside the home during the standoff, but was "safely removed" before Adams killed himself. According to a neighbor, police used a loudspeaker and sent a robot into the house in a failed attempt to coax him out.

Adams had no prior criminal record. His father, Alonzo, suggested that his football career may have played a role in the shooting, stating that the sport "messed him up". An autopsy revealed that Adams suffered from an "unusually severe" case of the brain disease chronic traumatic encephalopathy. He was one of at least 345 NFL players to be diagnosed after death with chronic traumatic encephalopathy (CTE), which is caused by repeated hits to the head.

== See also ==
- Concussions in American football
- List of mass shootings in the United States
- List of NFL players with chronic traumatic encephalopathy
