= Frank Evans High School =

- U.S. National Register of Historic Places
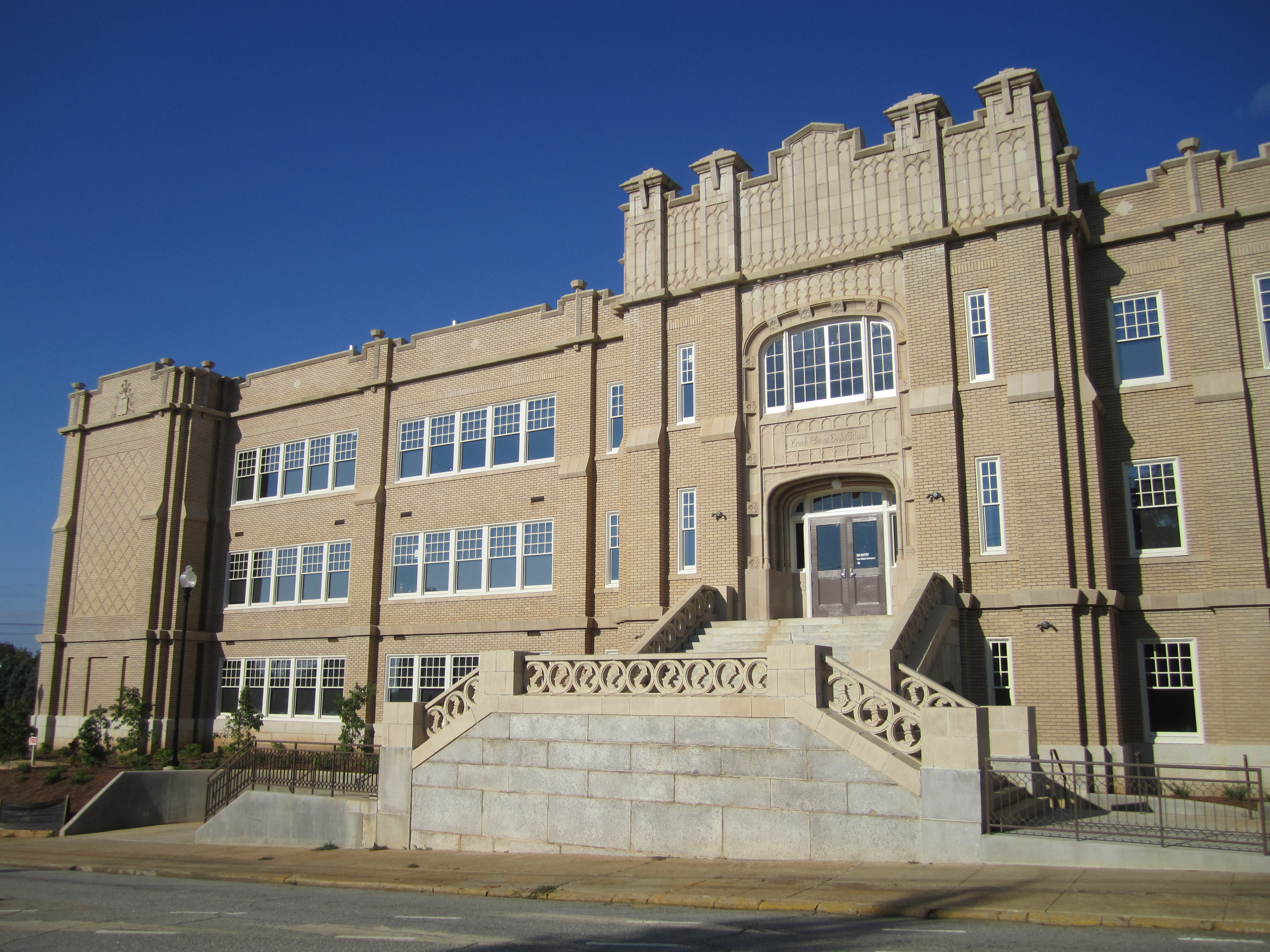
- Frank Evans High School, Dean St. side

- Location within South Carolina Location within the United States
- Location: 142 S. Dean St., Spartanburg, South Carolina
- Coordinates: 34°56′57″N 81°55′37″W
- Area: 4.59 acres (1.86 ha)
- Built: 1922, 1925, 1928
- Architect: G. Lloyd Preacher & Company, Lockwood, Greene & Co., J. Frank Collins
- NRHP reference No.: 12000373
- Added to NRHP: June 27, 2012

Frank Evans High School, also known as Evans Junior High School, is a historic high school building located at Spartanburg, Spartanburg County, South Carolina. It was built in 1922, with additions completed in 1925 and 1928. It is a three-story, Collegiate Gothic style, masonry school building. The school became a junior high school in 1959 when the new Spartanburg High School was built.

It was listed on the National Register of Historic Places in 2012.

In Summer 2009, Spartanburg Community College announced plans for a downtown Spartanburg presence, utilizing the historic Evans Building. Their goal was to provide a campus that would offer convenient access for under-served city residents. Classes began in Fall 2013 at the renovated building, referred to by SCC as the Evans Academic Center.

The building renovation received the 2015 Adaptive Reuse Citation Award from the American Institute of Architects’ South Carolina Chapter. The building also earned a LEED Silver certification.

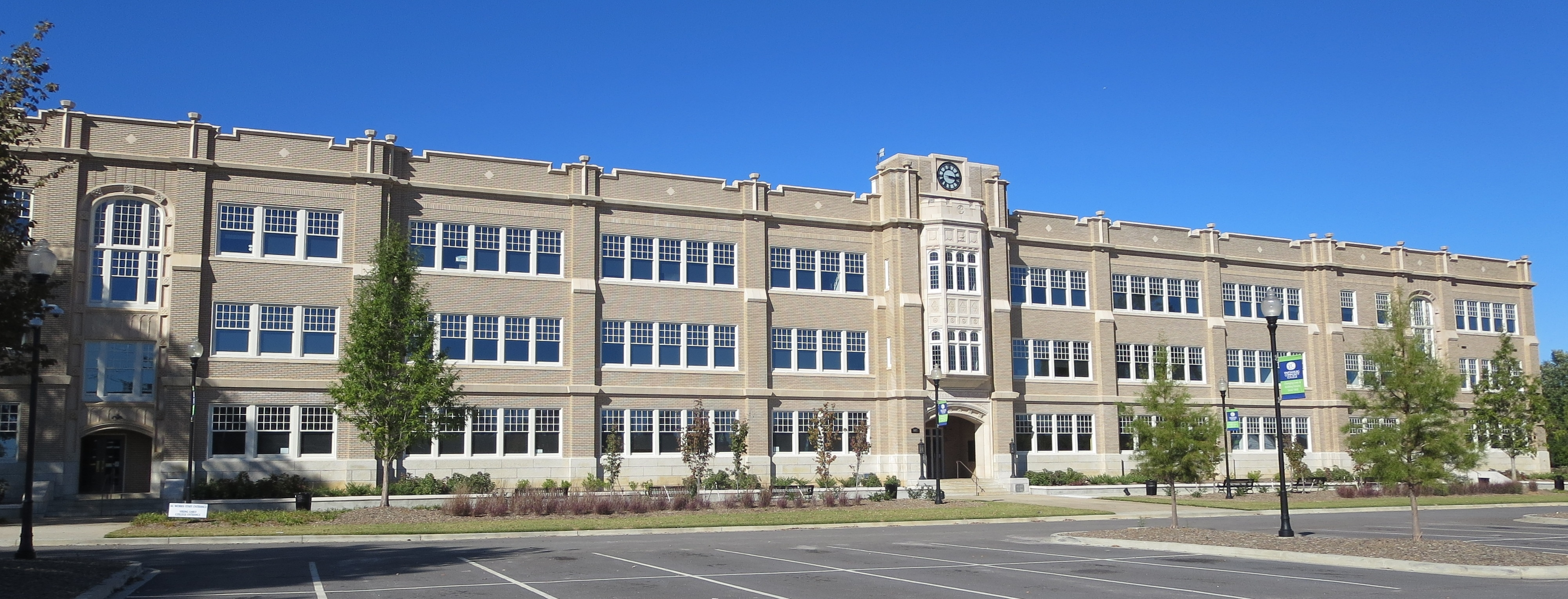
Kennedy Street side of the historic Frank Evans High School.
