= George Washington Carver High School (Spartanburg, South Carolina) =

Coordinates: 34.9374°N 81.9275°W

Location
- 467 South Church St; Spartanburg, South Carolina

Information
- Former name: Cumming Street Senior High School
- Team name: Tigers
- Yearbook: The Tiger

George Washington Carver High School was a public high school located in Spartanburg, South Carolina. This historically black school was named for George Washington Carver.

== History ==
Cumming Street Senior High School opened in 1926. In 1938, a new building was built and it was christened George Washington Carver High School.

In 1964, the school encouraged its graduates to integrate Wofford College in Spartanburg, and a student, Albert Gray, succeeded in becoming the first black student at Wofford.

In 1970, integration of public schools was forced by the federal courts. Carver merged with Spartanburg High School, which chose a new mascot and new colors. The Carver campus was changed to a junior high school.

== Notable alumni ==
- Ralph Coleman, former National Football League player
- Tim Hosley, former Major League Baseball player
- Kitty Black Perkins, former Chief Designer of Fashions and Doll Concepts for Mattel's Barbie line
- Howie Williams, former National Football League player
