= List of colleges and universities sanctioned by the American Association of University Professors =

As of 2025, fourteen colleges in the United States are on the American Association of University Professor's (AAUP) list of sanctioned institutions for violations of shared governance.

Institution	Location	Affiliation	Type	Year Sanctioned
Antioch University	Multiple campuses	Private	University	2010
Canisius University	New York	Roman Catholic (Jesuit)	University	2021
Elmira College	New York	Private	Private college	1995
Keuka College	New York	Private	Private college	2021
Illinois Wesleyan University	Illinois	Methodist	Liberal arts college	2021
Marian University	Wisconsin	Roman Catholic	University	2021
Miami Dade College	Florida	Public	Community college	2000
National University	California	Private	University	2021
New College of Florida	Florida	Public	Liberal arts college	2024
Rensselaer Polytechnic Institute	New York	Private	Research university	2011
Spartanburg Community College	South Carolina	Public	Community college	2024
Union College	New Jersey	Public	Community college	2016
Vermont Law and Graduate School	Vermont	Private	Law school	2019
Wittenberg University	Ohio	Private	Liberal arts college	2021

== See also ==
- List of colleges and universities censured by the American Association of University Professors
