= 2021 Rock Hill shooting =

Mass shooting in South Carolina, U.S.

Coordinates: 34.8523°N 81.0597°W

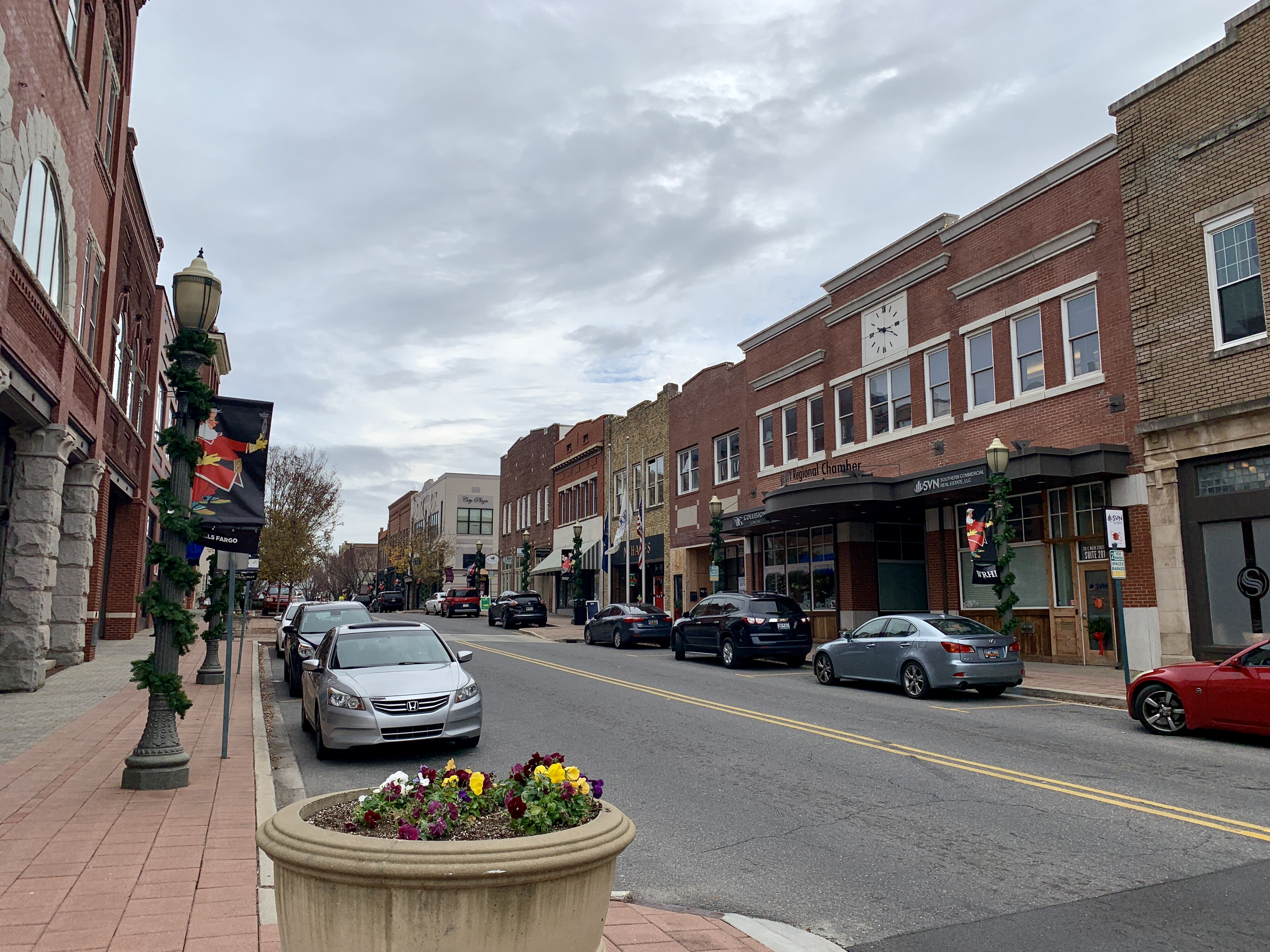
- Rock Hill in 2018
- Location: Rock Hill, South Carolina, U.S.
- Date: April 7, 2021; 4:45 p.m. EDT (20:45 UTC)
- Attack type: Mass shooting, murder–suicide
- Weapons: .45 caliber Thompson submachine gun; 9mm Heckler & Koch MP5
- Deaths: 7 (including the perpetrator who died by suicide)
- Injuries: 0
- Perpetrator: Phillip Adams
- Motive: Undetermined

On April 7, 2021, six people were shot and killed at a house in Rock Hill, South Carolina, United States, by Phillip Adams, a former cornerback in the National Football League (NFL). Adams, who lived in Rock Hill, killed four of his neighbors (a couple and their two grandchildren in the Lesslie family) at their home, as well as two repairmen who were working on the house's HVAC unit. After leaving the scene, Adams went to his parents' house, where he was found by police. The police tried to negotiate with Adams, but he fatally shot himself and was found dead the next day.

Adams' motive was never discovered. However, in his autopsy, he was diagnosed to have had a Stage II case of chronic traumatic encephalopathy (CTE), a brain disease which he likely received from brain damage while playing football. This included two concussions he received while playing for the Oakland Raiders in 2012. CTE is caused by repeated injuries to the head and can lead to cognitive decline; damage to the frontal lobes can result in violent and impulsive behavior.

== Background ==
=== Perpetrator ===
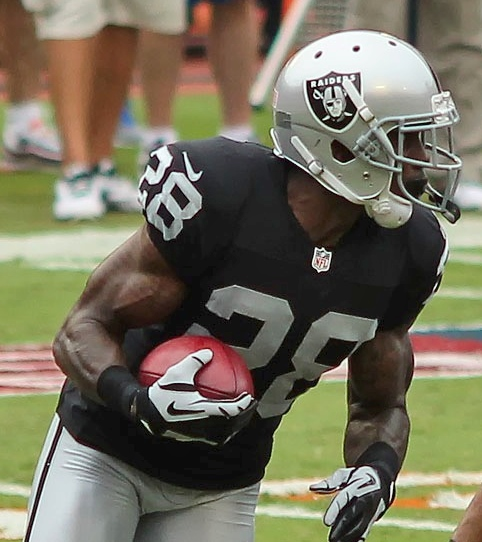
Phillip Adams playing for the Oakland Raiders in 2012

Phillip Adams was a professional football player for the National Football League (NFL), playing for six teams in seventy-eight games over seven seasons as a reserve cornerback. He had been playing football since the age of 7, and played for South Carolina State University (SCSU) from 2005 to 2009. Joe Montgomery, who coached Adams in high school, said that he was "the role model that all coaches hoped they could coach." Adams was a 7th round draft pick for the San Francisco 49ers in 2010, and went on to play for the New England Patriots, Seattle Seahawks, Oakland Raiders, New York Jets and finally the Atlanta Falcons, the team he was on when he retired from football in 2016.

In 2009, Adams' mother became paralyzed in a car accident, and he worked to support her. Adams also supported a son. Also that year, Adams was arrested for an assault and battery charge in Orangeburg, which he was not convicted of. The same happened when he was arrested for carrying a concealed gun in 2016 in Charlotte. In his rookie season in the NFL, Adams suffered a severe ankle injury that almost derailed his career. Adams' agent said the injury had prevented Adams from "reaching his potential", and that the injury "weighed on him heavily".

In 2021, Adams was thirty-two years old and living in his hometown of Rock Hill, South Carolina. He had moved back into his parents' home on the city's south side. Neighbors had thought of him as a "wonderful young man" and a "quiet, helping presence." Former Dallas Cowboys cornerback Kevin Smith claimed that Adams did not use any drugs or drink alcohol. However, after retiring from football, he often isolated himself, even from other players, and fell out of contact with old friends and teammates. Adams' father Alonzo stated that "he didn't talk much and he didn't bother nobody."

Adams operated a store selling smoothies and juice, but the business failed during the COVID-19 pandemic. Adams contacted his agent, who recommended a few jobs in Dallas, as well as to look into the mental health resources the NFL offered. Adams declined these options, and his agent "suspected Adams' mental health was deteriorating." He produced numerous notebooks filled with "cryptic" designs and emblems, which made authorities suspect he became interested in "a new religion or ideology." A neighbor reported that Adams would repeatedly pace around his front yard. Adams owned at least nine firearms.

=== Victims ===
Six victims were killed during the shooting in Rock Hill. Four were of the Lesslie family, who lived on Marshall Road: Robert Lesslie (age 70), his wife Barbara Lesslie (69), and their two grandchildren, Adah (9) and Noah (5) Lesslie. Their land was a forested plot with three buildings, one of which was used as their home. Adams lived about a quarter mile from their house.

Robert was a local doctor who founded two urgent care centers, wrote medical advice books and a weekly medical column for The Charlotte Observer, and worked for Camp Joy, a center for children with disabilities. He and Barbara were known for their community service and charity. The couple were married for forty years, and had four children and nine grandchildren.

The other two victims were James Lewis (38) and Robert Shook (38), who had been working on the HVAC unit for the Lesslies' house. They were both technicians employed at Gaston Sheet Metal Services (GSM Services) across the state line in Gastonia, North Carolina. Lewis and Shook each had three children.

== Shooting ==
Adams' shooting took place at the Lesslies' house on April 7, which was coincidentally the birthday of Robert and Barbara's daughter-in-law, the mother of Adah and Noah. At the time of the shooting, the couple were watching their grandchildren. That morning, Adams' father had attempted to call his agent and left a voicemail, calmly saying they needed to talk. A few hours later, Adams left his house with two guns and his phone, leaving on an ATV going west.

Shortly after, Adams shot Lewis and Shook outside the Lesslies' house, then went inside and shot Robert, Barbara, Adah, and Noah in the back room. Police received two 9-1-1 calls around 4:45 p.m. EDT. One was from Shook, who provided details on what had happened to him. The other was from a man who was mowing his lawn nearby, who heard about twenty shots fired at the Lesslie house. Once the shots died down, Adams walked out of the house. Both a .45 caliber weapon and a 9mm weapon were used in the shooting. Three dozen casings and more than twenty "projectiles" were found at the crime scene. Police said they did not know where Adams obtained the weapons.

=== Law enforcement response and Adams' suicide ===
York County authorities sent out a phone call to at least one neighbor of the Lesslies, Phyllis Ferguson, telling her to lock down her house. Ferguson saw Adah and Noah's mother attempting to get through emergency personnel to her family, and allowed her into her (Ferguson's) house. Deputies also visited another neighbor's house, and advised them to stay inside. The York County Sheriff's Office tweeted that detectives were searching for a man wearing a black hoodie and camouflage pants, who was last seen in the area and may be armed and dangerous. Residents were told to stay inside and lock their doors.

Alongside police, medical helicopters, an ambulance and a SWAT team responded to the scene. Police cleared the house, and then found the two repairmen in the yard of the home next to their vehicles. Lewis was dead, and Shook at that point was still alive. Authorities then searched nearby woods with dogs.

Police found Adams' cellphone at the house, which he had dropped on the way out, quickly making him a prime suspect. A manhunt was launched for Adams, assisted by a drone and helicopter, before police found him at his parents' house around 9 p.m. However, a helicopter continued flying through the area until midnight.

Police spent several hours negotiating with Adams using a loudspeaker, trying to get him to surrender. At some point, Adams' parents were evacuated from the house, and police sent in a robot to scan the residence. At 1:00 a.m., the media was briefed that the perpetrator's location had been found. Police found Adams dead inside the house at 2:30 a.m., along with .45 caliber and 9mm handguns. His cause of death was listed as a self-inflicted gunshot wound from the .45 caliber handgun. Police reported they did not hear the gunshot, although a neighbor heard a shot sound at 12:30 a.m.

== Aftermath ==
External videos
- "Former N.F.L. Player Kills 5 in South Carolina", The New York Times, April 8, 2021

Shook was flown to a Charlotte hospital in critical condition, and was given multiple surgeries. Despite this, he died several days later. Shook had been shot at least six times, and the fatal bullet pierced his liver.

On April 8, the York County Sheriff's Office stated in a press conference that the perpetrator was Adams, confirmed by his father. They were also in the process of searching Adams' home, and said they believed no other perpetrators were involved. All the deaths were investigated as homicides.

The Lesslie family, York City Council, York City Government, U.S. President Joe Biden, South Carolina Governor Henry McMaster, Representative Ralph Norman, GSM Services and the NFL made statements regarding the shooting. Biden mentioned it in a speech about gun reform on April 8; he said, “Gun violence in this country is an epidemic,” using Rock Hill as an example. On April 8, the South Carolina State Senate adjourned in the victims' memory.

Ceremonies were held at First ARP Church in Rock Hill and at GSM Services, and a memorial was made at Robert's medical office, which continued to operate. A GoFundMe campaign was made for the families of Shook and Lewis, which raised $400,000 that was split between the two of them. The remaining members of the Lesslie family asked that any memorials be made to Camp Joy. They also expressed forgiveness towards Adams.

Rock Hill had been known as "Football City U.S.A.", for the number of football players that had lived there. The sport had been a "social event, a source of civic pride, [and] a pathway to glory" for the city; after the shooting, this attitude lessened.

In December 2021, Holly Shook, the widow of Robert Shook, filed a wrongful death lawsuit against Adams' estate. The lawsuit claimed that the Shook family suffered extreme emotional distress, as well as damages that exceeded $75,000 "exclusive of interest and costs."

=== Adams' motive ===
The York County Sheriff's Office stated after the shooting that they could not determine any motive. Adams had had no prior criminal record. The New York Times wrote that it was difficult to find a motive in cases where the perpetrator was dead and had not written a suicide note. Adams was not one of Robert Lesslie's patients, but his father had been, many years ago.

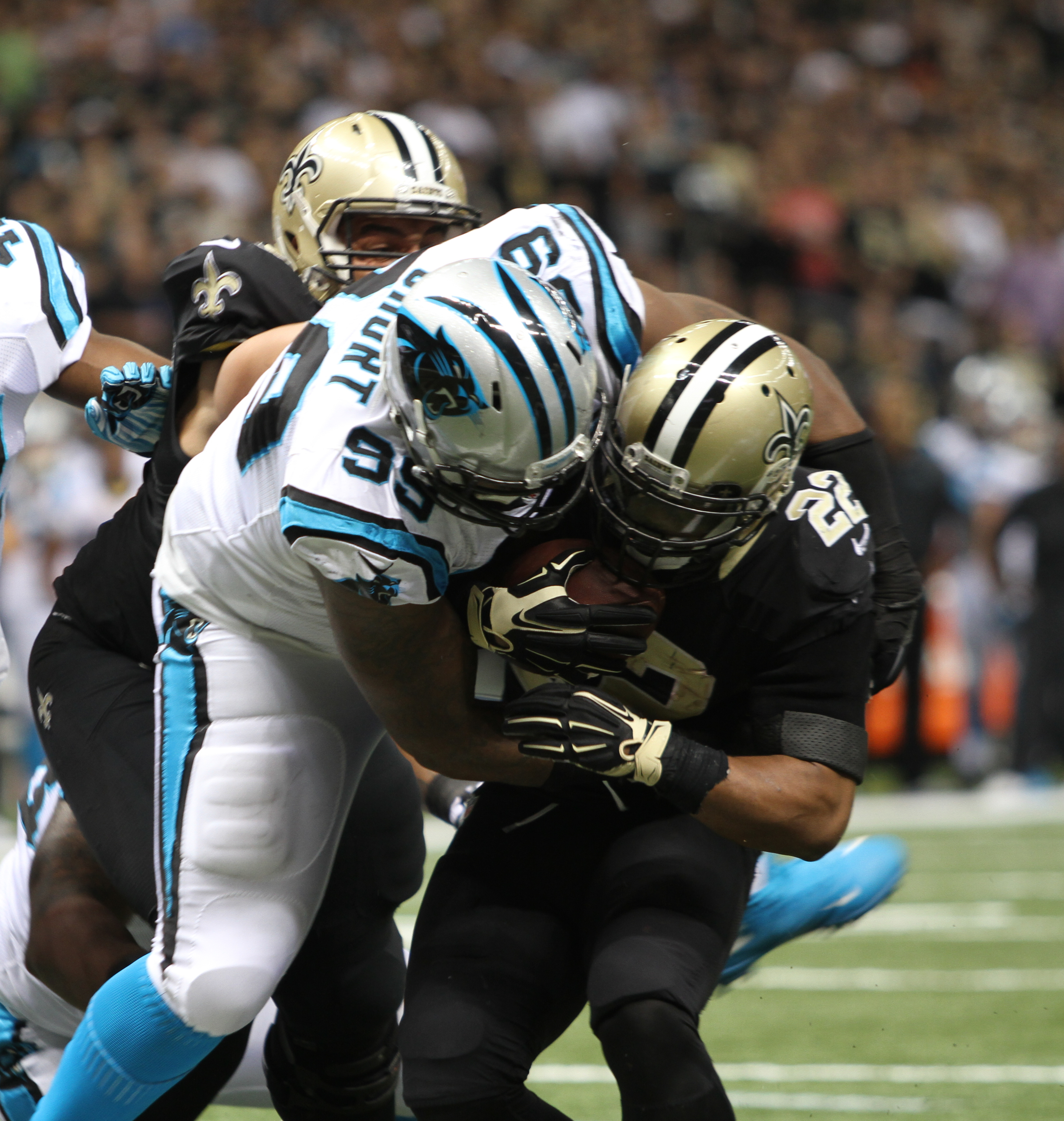
During tackles in American football, players often experience head collisions. These can cause head trauma, in spite of the protection given by helmets.

Adams' family suggested that his football career may have caused brain damage that played a role in the shooting. His father insisted that he was a "good kid" and that the sport "messed him up." The York County Coroner's Office and researchers at Boston University conducted a study of Adams' brain. An autopsy revealed that Adams suffered from a stage II case of the brain disease chronic traumatic encephalopathy (CTE). "Unusually severe" damage was found in his frontal lobes.

CTE is caused by repeated injuries to the head and can only be diagnosed after death. It causes cognitive decline, and when there is damage on the frontal lobes, it can lead to aggression, impulsive behaviors, a lack of self-control and a lowering of the threshold it takes for someone to commit a homicidal act. Playing with the Raiders in December 2012, Adams had suffered at least two concussions.

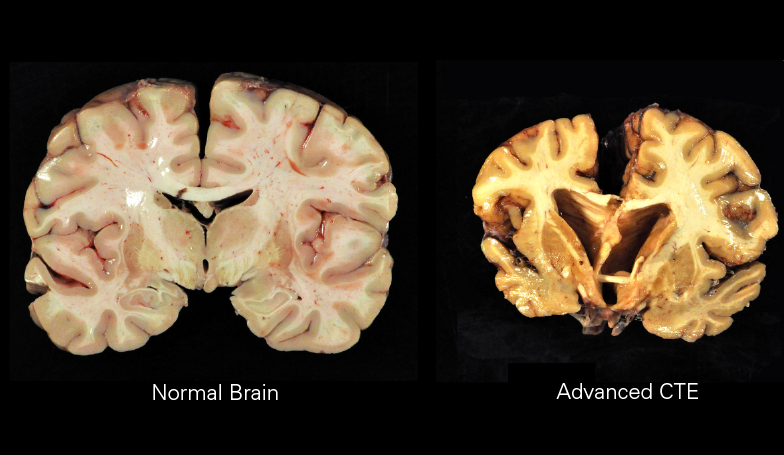
A healthy human brain compared with one damaged by CTE; this damaged brain is not necessarily the size of Adams' at the time of his death

When Adams received the concussions, it was not clear if they would give him long-lasting injuries. He was not able to get tested as a part of the NFL's settlement with players regarding concussions; the settlement was only for players who had retired by 2014. Adams' former agent reported he would not consider the agent's health tips regarding disability.

Adams' sister said his personality changed a few years prior to 2021, when "he became argumentative." By 2021, Adams had been suffering decreased mental health, intense pain, memory issues and difficulty sleeping. He had tried to get help via a disability claim with the NFL multiple times; his family says his request was denied due to his inability to remember certain things and perform simple tasks, yet those effects were likely the result of his disease. Adams' sister said that he had expressed resentment towards the NFL two weeks prior to the shooting, and that his inability to the collect a claim from them made him feel like the "world was against him."

Ann McKee of the Boston University CTE Center said that Adams' case of CTE was "definitely" caused by his football career, and compared Adams' level of brain damage to Aaron Hernandez, an NFL player who was convicted of murder in 2013. McKee said the NFL needed to increase their efforts to prevent and track CTE, as well as test it in former players. The Lesslie family said the diagnosis provided comfort for them, in how it gave an explanation for the murders. The NFL thanked the researchers for their work, saying the research will benefit them, and noted that they had committed $100 million to neuroscience research in 2016.

In April 2023, the Adams family filed a wrongful death lawsuit against SCSU, seeking an unspecified amount of damages. They alleged that the school was criminally negligent during Adams' football career there, which led to his CTE, and thus, his death. The school was said to have failed in following general safety practices, and educating Adams and their staff about concussions and head trauma. SCSU denied the allegations, saying that they "employed trained and qualified medical professionals and athletic trainers" and their actions did not result in Adams' death. In May 2024, the Adams family filed a motion to amend the lawsuit to include the NFL as also being criminally negligent for the same reasons.

In 2025, Chris Jericho interviewed Concussion Legacy Project member Christopher Nowinski for his podcast. Nowinski saw Adams' incident was similar to that of the Chris Benoit double-murder and suicide in 2007.

== See also ==
- 2025 Midtown Manhattan shooting – A mass shooting committed by a former high school football player who had CTE
