= Spartanburg Community College =

Public college in Spartanburg, South Carolina, US

- Former names: Spartanburg Technical Education Center (1963-1972); Spartanburg Technical College (1972-2006)
- Motto: Dream It, Chase It, Live It.
- Type: Public community college
- Established: 1963; 63 years ago
- Parent institution: South Carolina Technical College System
- President: Michael Mikota
- Students: 6,097
- Location: Spartanburg, South Carolina, United States; 34.975°N 81.990°W
- Campus: Suburban
- Area: 42.1 hectares (104 acres)
- Colors: Blue and Green
- Nickname: Chasers
- Mascot: Chaser the Mascot
- Website: www.sccsc.edu
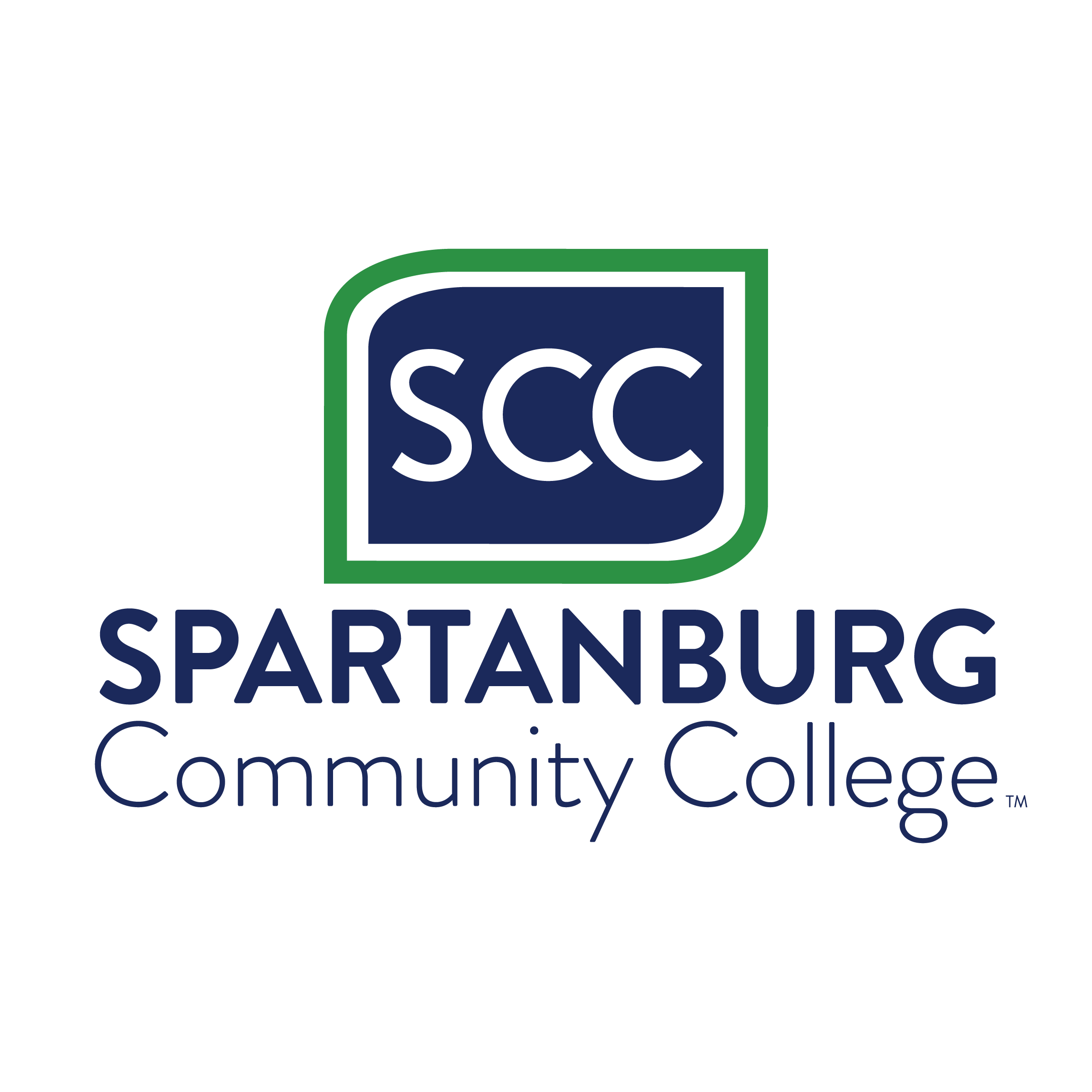

Spartanburg Community College (SCC) is a public community college in Spartanburg, South Carolina. The college serves the citizens of Spartanburg, Cherokee, and Union counties in Upstate South Carolina.

== History ==
Spartanburg Community College was founded in 1963. It was originally named the Spartanburg Technical Education Center.

In 1971, the South Carolina General Assembly recognized the need for affordable, accessible higher education and commissioned a study on creating a community college system. This led to the passing of Act 1268 in 1972, establishing the State Board for Technical and Comprehensive Education and allowing technical colleges to offer college-transfer programs. At this time, the institution became known as Spartanburg Technical College (STC).

By 1984, enrollment had grown to 1,653 students. The college added new facilities, including the Tracy J. Gaines Learning Resource Center and the Industrial Training Facility, strengthening its role in workforce development.

The 1990s brought another leap forward with the launch of the University Transfer Program, giving students a more affordable path to a four-year degree. By the late 1990s, STC had transformed into a comprehensive community college. A state-of-the-art Health Sciences facility, student services building, and major campus renovations followed, ensuring students had access to modern resources.

In the 2000s, STC continued to expand with the addition of an associate degree in nursing, the Cherokee County Campus, and the Tyger River Campus in Duncan. These locations provided more students with access to quality education and workforce training. The Library Learning Resource Center, completed in 2007, enhanced research and academic support.

Recognizing its broad impact beyond technical education, in 2006 the college renamed itself Spartanburg Community College—a name that better reflected its mission of serving the entire community with diverse academic and workforce programs.

Since 2020, Spartanburg Community College (SCC) has experienced notable enrollment growth, with student numbers increasing significantly—driven in part by new free‐tuition initiatives. During the same period, the college dissolved its longstanding faculty senate and established a new representative body, a move that was met with opposition from faculty members and raised concerns regarding the school's academic governance practices. These governance changes prompted an investigation by the American Association of University Professors (AAUP). In a public statement amid the administration‑faculty tensions, SCC President Michael Mikota remarked that campus leaders would “continue to focus our attention on our students and serving our communities while minimizing distractions and divisive attempts to derail our momentum."

In 2024, the college was sanctioned by the American Association of University Professors "for infringement of governance standards."

== Campuses ==
Spartanburg Community College has multiple locations:

- Spartanburg Campus (Giles), in Spartanburg County, South Carolina
- Tyger River Campus in Duncan, South Carolina
- Cherokee County Campus in Gaffney, South Carolina
- Union County Campus in Union, South Carolina
- Downtown Campus (Evans) in Spartanburg, South Carolina

== Mascot ==
In November 2021, Chaser the Mascot, a custom drawn cartoon Border Collie, was named the first mascot in the college's history.

== See also ==
- Frank Evans High School
