= Landon Cohen =

American football player (born 1986)

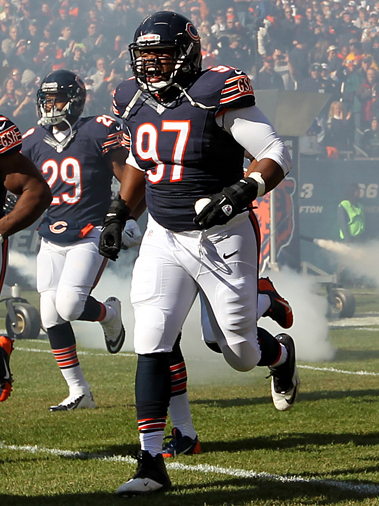
- Cohen with the Chicago Bears in 2013

No. 98, 99, 66, 92, 97, 67
- Position: Defensive tackle

Personal information
- Born: August 3, 1986 (age 40); Spartanburg, South Carolina, U.S.
- Listed height: 6 ft 1 in (1.85 m)
- Listed weight: 300 lb (136 kg)

Career information
- High school: Spartanburg
- College: Ohio
- NFL draft: 2008: 7th round, 216th overall pick

Career history
- Detroit Lions (2008–2009); Jacksonville Jaguars (2010); New England Patriots (2010); Seattle Seahawks (2011)*; New England Patriots (2011); Arizona Cardinals (2012)*; Philadelphia Eagles (2012)*; Sacramento Mountain Lions (2012); Dallas Cowboys (2013); Chicago Bears (2013); Buffalo Bills (2014)*; Seattle Seahawks (2014); Ottawa Redblacks (2016–2017)
- * Offseason or practice squad member only

Awards and highlights
- Grey Cup champion (2016); 2× Second-team All-MAC (2006, 2007)

Career NFL statistics
- Total tackles: 46
- Forced fumbles: 1
- Stats at Pro Football Reference
- Stats at CFL.ca

Landon Cohen (born August 3, 1986) is an American former professional football player who was a defensive tackle in the National Football League (NFL) and Canadian Football League (CFL). He played college football for the Ohio Bobcats and was selected by the Detroit Lions in the seventh round of the 2008 NFL draft. He was also a member of the NFL's Jacksonville Jaguars, New England Patriots, Seattle Seahawks, Arizona Cardinals, Philadelphia Eagles, Dallas Cowboys, Chicago Bears, and Buffalo Bills, as well as the CFL's Ottawa Redblacks.

== Early life ==
Cohen was born in Spartanburg, South Carolina, to Carolyn Ragin and Charles Cohen. He played high school football at Spartanburg High School, where he also lettered in track and field. In football, Cohen recorded 107 tackles, six sacks, and 28 quarterback pressures as a senior and earned all-state honors.

== College career ==
After high school, Cohen attended Ohio University, where he played in 12 games as a true freshman in 2004, making three starts at nose guard. In 2005, he started all 11 games as a sophomore, finishing with 28 tackles and two quarterback pressures. As a junior in 2006, Cohen started all 14 games and tallied 40 tackles (including 14 for a loss), earning second-team All-Mid-American Conference honors. In 2007, as a senior, he started all 12 games, recording a career-high 59 tackles (12.5 for a loss) and 1.5 sacks, one forced fumble, two fumble recoveries. After the season, he again was named to the All-MAC second-team.

== Professional career ==
Pre-draft measurables
Height	Weight
6 ft 2 7/8 in (1.90 m)	278 lb (126 kg)
Values from Pro Day

=== Detroit Lions ===
Cohen was selected by the Detroit Lions in the seventh round (216th overall) of the 2008 NFL draft. He played in six games as a rookie, finishing with four tackles. In 2009, Cohen played in 14 games, starting four, recording 21 tackles on the season. He was waived by the Lions on September 4, 2010.

=== Jacksonville Jaguars ===
The Jacksonville Jaguars claimed Cohen off waivers on September 5, 2010. He played in two games for the Jaguars, recording two tackles, before being waived on November 9, 2010.

=== New England Patriots ===
Cohen was signed by the New England Patriots on December 22, 2010. He played in the final two games of the season for the Patriots, starting one and recording three tackles. He was waived on September 3, 2011. Cohen was re-signed by the Patriots on September 21, 2011, but was waived on September 27.

=== Seattle Seahawks (first stint) ===
On September 4, 2011, the Seattle Seahawks claimed him off waivers, but he was waived on September 10.

=== Arizona Cardinals ===
Cohen signed with the Arizona Cardinals on May 16, 2012. He was waived on August 25, 2012.

=== Philadelphia Eagles ===
Cohen was signed by the Philadelphia Eagles on August 30, 2012, and was waived the next day.

=== Dallas Cowboys ===
On July 25, 2013, Cohen was signed by the Dallas Cowboys. He was waived on September 16, 2013.

=== Chicago Bears ===
On September 27, 2013, Cohen was signed by the Chicago Bears.

=== Buffalo Bills ===
Cohen was signed by the Buffalo Bills on July 21, 2014. The Bills released Cohen on August 29, 2014.

=== Seattle Seahawks (second stint) ===
Cohen was signed by the Seattle Seahawks on January 5, 2015, adding him to their 53-man roster for the divisional playoff round.

== Personal life ==
Cohen is also a part owner of a valet service called "The Valet, LLC" in Spartanburg, SC and works there when he is not playing football.
