= Howie Williams =

American football player (born 1936)

No. 29, 28
- Position: Safety

Personal information
- Born: December 4, 1936 (age 89); Spartanburg, South Carolina, U.S.
- Listed height: 6 ft 1 in (1.85 m)
- Listed weight: 190 lb (86 kg)

Career information
- High school: Carver (Spartanburg)
- College: Howard
- NFL draft: 1962: undrafted

Career history
- Green Bay Packers (1962–1963); San Francisco 49ers (1963); Oakland Raiders (1964–1969)

Awards and highlights
- NFL champion (1962); AFL champion (1967)

Career NFL/AFL statistics
- Interceptions: 14
- Fumble recoveries: 1
- Stats at Pro Football Reference

Howard Lee Williams (born December 4, 1936) is an American former professional football player who was a safety. He played for the National Football League (NFL)'s Green Bay Packers and San Francisco 49ers, and for the American Football League (AFL)'s Oakland Raiders.

== Early life and education ==
Williams graduated from the School of Engineering and Architecture at Howard University in June 1963. He majored in electronics. He is also a veteran of the United States Air Force.

== Career ==
Williams played for seven seasons and three different teams. As a rookie, he was on the Green Bay Packers when they beat the New York Giants 16–7 in the 1962 NFL Championship Game. He played only seven games for the team the following season before being waived. He was immediately claimed by the Washington Redskins, but was sent to the San Francisco 49ers, which had a lower standing.

The following year, Williams joined the Oakland Raiders, where he would spend the next six seasons, including three consecutive AFL title game appearances (1967, 1968, and 1969), along with an appearance in Super Bowl II. In his career, he had 14 interceptions for 240 yards in 95 games played.

== Personal life ==
Williams' son, Gardner Williams, also spent time with the Raiders.

== See also ==
- List of American Football League players
