= Katie Cotton =

American public relations executive

Kathryn Elizabeth Cotton (October 30, 1965 – April 6, 2023) was an American public relations executive. She was the Vice President of worldwide communications for Apple Inc. from 1996 to 2014. She was a major figure in the communications strategy and the culture of secrecy of Apple.
