= Benjamin Gold (politician) =

American politician

Benjamin Gold (1762–1847) was one of two members of the Connecticut State Assembly representing Cornwall, Connecticut in 1809. His daughter later married Cherokee leader Elias Boudinot. He was first elected to the state legislature from the area in 1802 and served on and off until 1814.

Gold was the father of 14 children and both a colonel in the local militia and a deacon in the local congregational church. His daughter Harriet's marriage to the Cherokee Elias Boudinot occurred despite his opposition to the marriage. He was also one of the founders of the Foreign Mission School, organized to educate non-Anglo American students in Christianity. This is the school that brought Boudinot to Connecticut.
