= Cherokee Phoenix =

Native American newspaper

ᏣᎳᎩ ᏧᎴᎯᏌᏅᎯ Cherokee Phoenix
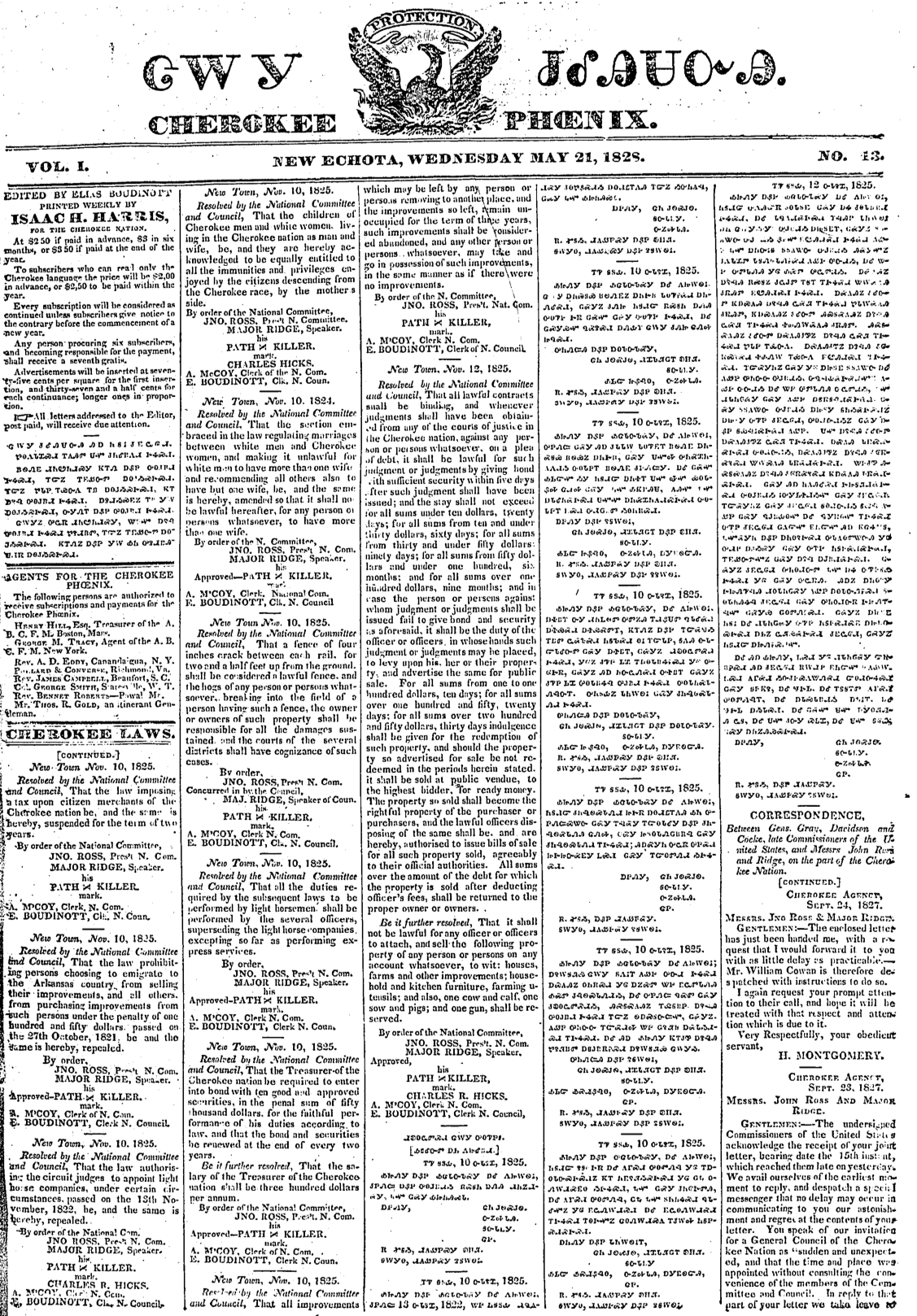
- Front page of the Cherokee Phoenix 1828
- Type: Weekly newspaper
- Owner: Cherokee Nation
- Founder(s): Galagina Oowatie; Samuel Worcester
- Founded: 1828
- Language: Cherokee and English
- Headquarters: Cherokee Nation Tribal Complex; Tsa-La-Gi Annex Room 231; Tahlequah, Oklahoma
- OCLC number: 53811290
- Website: cherokeephoenix.org

The Cherokee Phoenix (Cherokee: ᏣᎳᎩ ᏧᎴᎯᏌᏅᎯ, romanized: Tsalagi Tsulehisanvhi) is the first newspaper published by Native Americans in the United States and the first published in a Native American language. The first issue was published in English and Cherokee on February 21, 1828, in New Echota, capital of the Cherokee Nation (present-day Georgia). The paper continued until 1834. The Cherokee Phoenix was revived in the 20th century, and today it publishes both print and Internet versions.

== 19th century ==
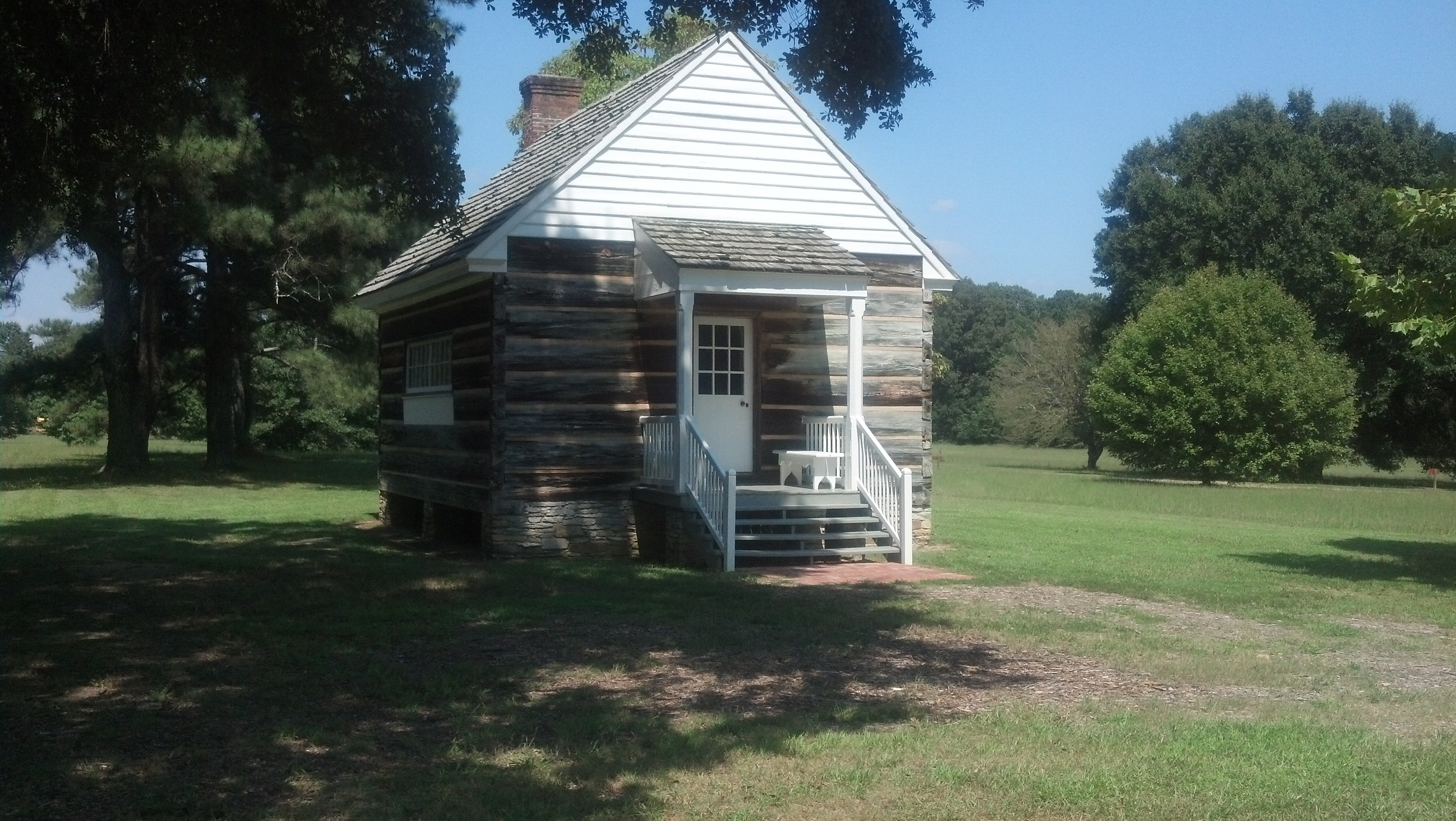
Reconstruction of the original print shop located at New Echota, in which the Cherokee Phoenix was printed

In the mid-1820s the Cherokee tribe was being pressured by the government, and by Georgia in particular, to remove to new lands west of the Mississippi River, or to end their tribal government and surrender control of their traditional territory to the United States (US) government. The General Council of the Cherokee Nation established a newspaper, in collaboration with Samuel Worcester, a missionary, who cast the type for the Cherokee syllabary. The Council selected Elias Boudinot as the first editor.

Named Galagina Oowatie (ᎦᎴᎩᎾ ᎤᏩᏘ) in the Cherokee language, Elias Boudinot was born in 1804 at Oothcaloga, Cherokee Nation, near present-day Chatsworth, Georgia. He chose the name of Elias Boudinot after meeting the statesman, while on his way to the Foreign Mission School in Cornwall, Connecticut, where he graduated. There Boudinot married Harriet Ruggles Gold, daughter of a prominent Congregational family. They returned to live at New Echota.

Boudinot named the Cherokee Phoenix as a symbol of renewal, for the mythical bird that rose to new life from ashes of fire. The Nation founded the paper to gather support and to help keep members of the Cherokee Nation united and informed. The newspaper was printed in English and Cherokee, using the Cherokee syllabary developed in 1821 by Sequoyah. According to Langguth, those who could only read Cherokee received the paper free, while those who could read English paid according to a sliding scale: $2.50 a year if they paid in advance and $3.50 a year if they waited a year. It served as the primary vehicle of communication among the many Cherokee townships that constituted the Cherokee Nation. The Nation occupied parts of what are now Virginia, North Carolina, Alabama and Georgia.

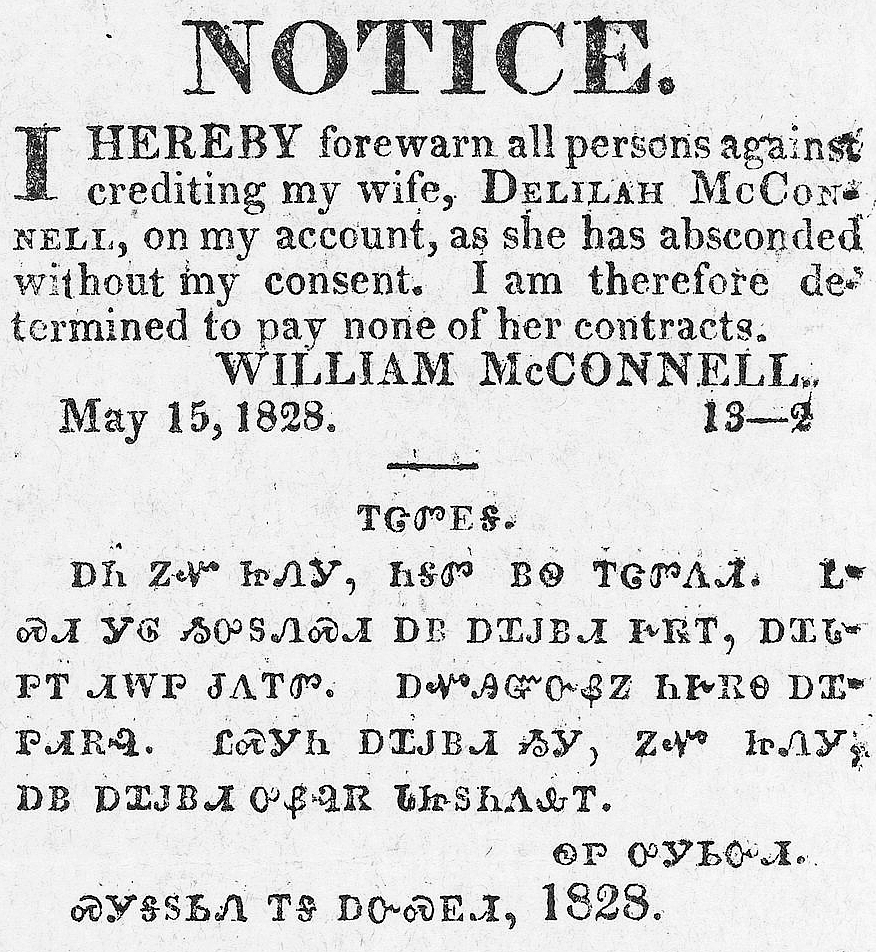
Bilingual notice in English and Cherokee, published in the Cherokee Phoenix, May 15, 1828

The first issue appeared on February 21, 1828. It contained five columns on each of its four pages. The editor announced that, because translation between English and Cherokee was slow, initially the paper would print only three columns each week in the Cherokee language. The first issue covered a variety of subjects. Samuel Worcester wrote an article praising Sequoyah's invention of the syllabary, and Boudinot's first editorial criticized white settlers wanting Cherokee land. As the issue of removal attracted attention in the United States (US), the newspaper arranged a fund-raising and publicity tour, which attracted new subscribers from almost all areas of the US and Europe. Boudinot gradually published mostly in English, trying to reach that larger audience.

In 1829, Boudinot renamed the Cherokee Phoenix as the Cherokee Phoenix and Indians' Advocate, reflecting his intention to influence an audience beyond the Cherokee. He addressed issues which Indians across the United States and its territories faced related to assimilation and removal from their traditional homelands. The paper no longer related solely to the Cherokee tribe. The paper also offered stories about debates over Indian removal and U.S. Supreme Court cases that affected Indian life.

Boudinot believed removal was inevitable and that the Cherokee should protect their rights by treaty. He was allied with Major Ridge in this view. His views were opposed by the majority of the Cherokee, including Principal Chief John Ross, elected by the constitutional republic in 1828. Former allies in the Cherokee government turned against Boudinot and other "treaty advocates". Opponents attacked the men's loyalty and prevented their speaking in councils. Ross denounced Boudinot's "toleration of diversified views in the Cherokee Phoenix and forbade Boudinot from discussing pro-removal arguments in the paper. The paper had never been intended as a vehicle for free speech, but rather as a publication expressing the positions of the leadership of the Cherokee nation. In protest, Boudinot resigned in the spring of 1832. Ross' brother-in-law, Elijah Hicks, who was opposed to removal, replaced Boudinot as editor.

When the federal government failed to pay the annuity to the Cherokee in 1834, the paper ceased publication. In August 1835 a contingent of the Georgia Guard took the printing press to prevent any further publication. The real objective was to prevent the newspaper from falling under the influence of John Ross. The state militia was organized to police the Cherokee territory which the state had claimed.

== Recent developments ==
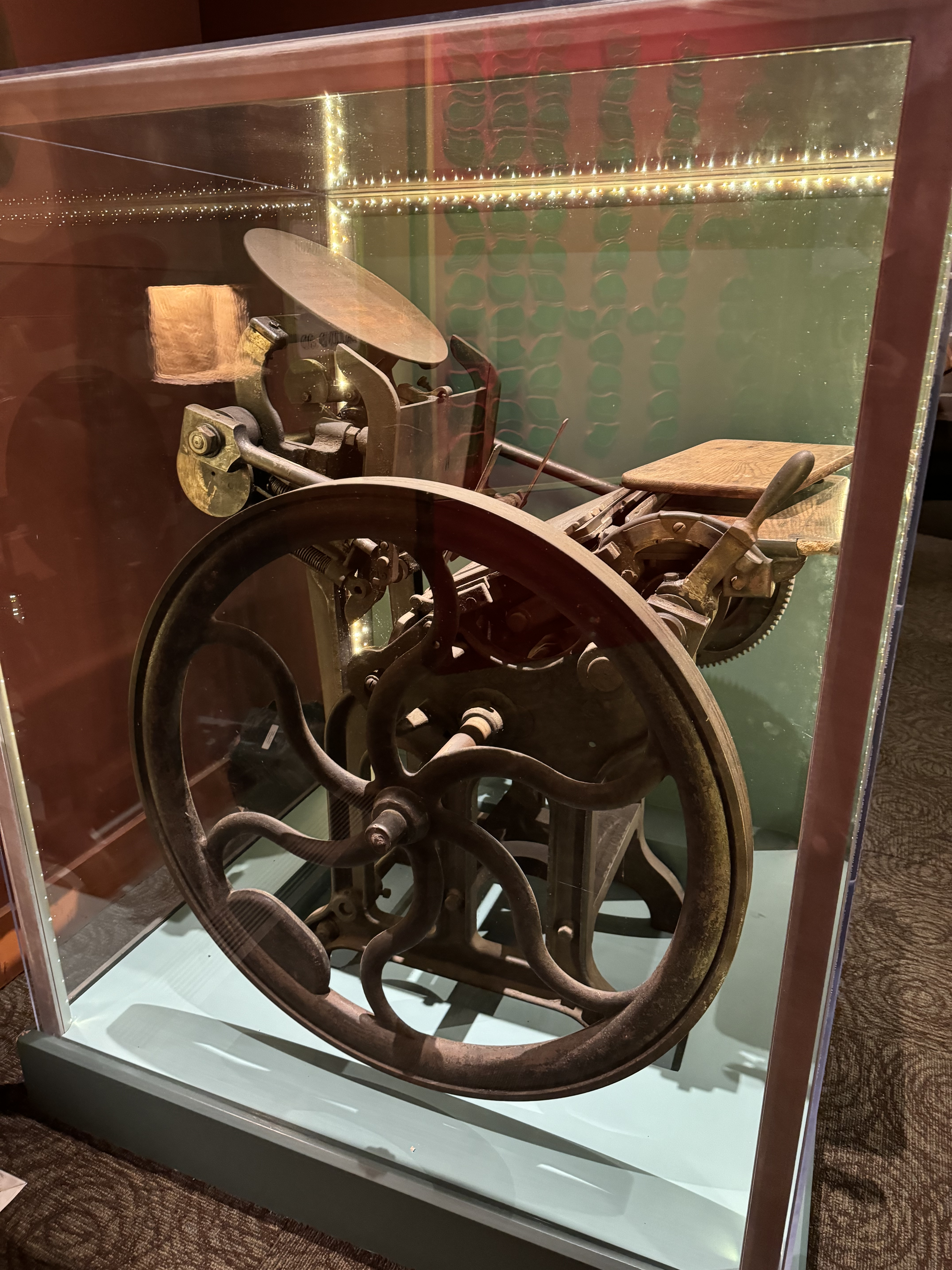
The Cherokee Phoenix printing press on display at the Museum of the Cherokee Indian

The Cherokee Phoenix published intermittently after Cherokee removal to Indian Territory. Since the late 20th century, it has been revived and is now published by the Cherokee Nation as a monthly broadsheet in Tahlequah, Oklahoma. The newspaper has since modernized, publishing on the Internet along with the print version.

A digitized, searchable version of the paper is available through the University of Georgia libraries and the Digital Library of Georgia. Transcriptions of the English-language portions of the 19th-century newspaper can be found at Western Carolina University's Hunter Library's Web site.

Artists Jeff Marley and Frank Brannon completed a collaborative project on October 19, 2013, in which they printed using Cherokee syllabary type in the print shop at New Echota. This was the first time syllabary printing type was used at New Echota since 1835.

== See also ==
- Cherokee Advocate (1844–1906), a separate publication
- Ádahooníłígíí (1943–1957), Navajo-language newspaper

== Sources ==
- Langguth, A. J. Driven West: Andrew Jackson and the Trail of Tears to the Civil War. New York, Simon & Schuster. 2010. ISBN 978-1-4165-4859-1.
