= Frank Brannon =

American book artist

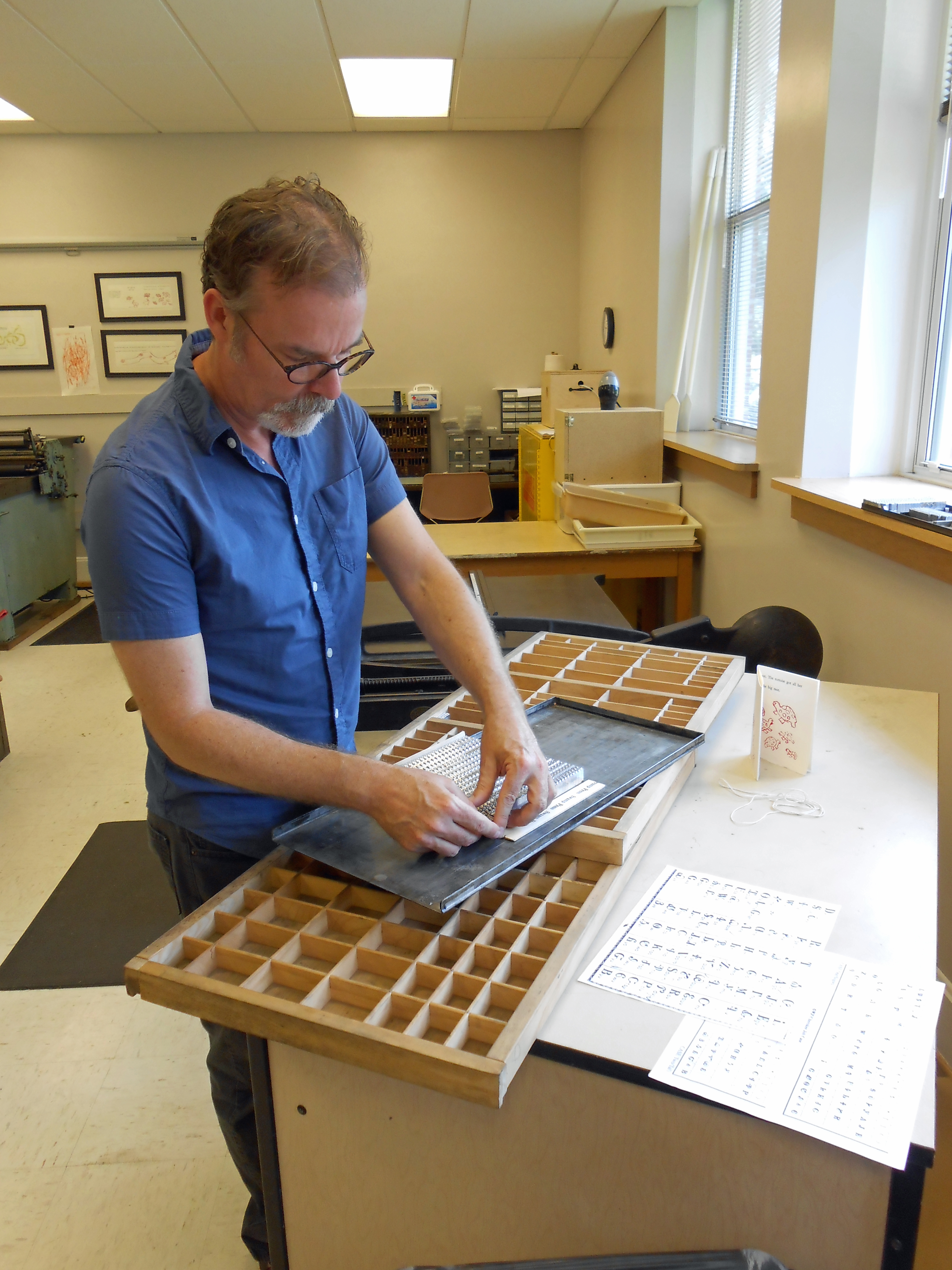
- Born: John F. Brannon, Jr. 1965 (age 60–61); Maryville, Tennessee, United States
- Education: MFA, University of Alabama
- Notable work: Cherokee Phoenix: Advent of a Newspaper (2005); Cathleen A. Baker's The Paste Papers of Louise Lawrence Foster (2011)
- Awards: Mary B. Reagan Artist in Residency, 2014
- Website: www.speakeasypress.com

Frank Brannon (born 1965) is an American book and paper artist, and the proprietor of Speakeasy Press.

== Background ==
John F. Brannon, Jr. (Frank), a native of Tennessee, was born in Maryville, Tennessee, United States, in 1965. He is a graduate of the M.F.A. in the Book Arts Program at the University of Alabama. Brannon previously studied Atmospheric Sciences (incomplete doctoral studies, State University of New York at Stony Brook, 1991–1994) and Physics (M.S., 1991 and B.S., Phi Beta Kappa, 1987) at the University of Tennessee. Brannon has been a member of the Southern Highland Craft Guild since 2013.

The limited edition, letterpress books that Brannon produces are held in several special collections libraries in the United States and England, as well as with private collectors. His 2005 letterpress monograph focuses upon research into the Cherokee Phoenix newspaper of northern Georgia, 1828–1834. Brannon continues research on the origins of this historical newspaper as well as an exploration of the character-forms of the original Sequoyan syllabary.

=== Awards ===
Brannon became the first recipient of the North Carolina Arts Council's Mary B. Reagan Artist Residency Grant in 2014 to continue his work with the revitalization of Cherokee Language printing.

Brannon was selected as the artist in residency at Ashantilly Center for 2015. William G Haynes, founder of the Ashantilly Center and an artists and printer, helped the Georgia Department of Natural Resources set up the reconstructed print shop at New Echota in 1978.

In 2016, Brannon received Virginia Foundation for the Humanities Residential Fellowships, for 2016–2017, to document the history of Cherokee Language printing.

== Work ==
Brannon is primarily a book and paper artist, and has created several hand-bound, hand-printed editions. His work includes a focus on exploring the book form, experimental paper-making, and the Cherokee syllabary (including printing in the language). Brannon also engages in other art forms, as well as collaborating with other artists in a variety of capacities. He has participated in creating site-specific installations as well as costumes that Incorporated handmade paper.

In October 2013, Brannon collaborated with artist Jeff Marley to print using Cherokee syllabary type at New Echota. This marked the first time in 178 years that monotype was used to print in the Cherokee language at New Echota. Brannon has also worked with choreographer Amy Dowling and costumer Susan Brown-Strauss to create hand made paper costumes used in the performance art piece, Absolute Relativity at {Re}happening in 2014.

=== Academic work ===
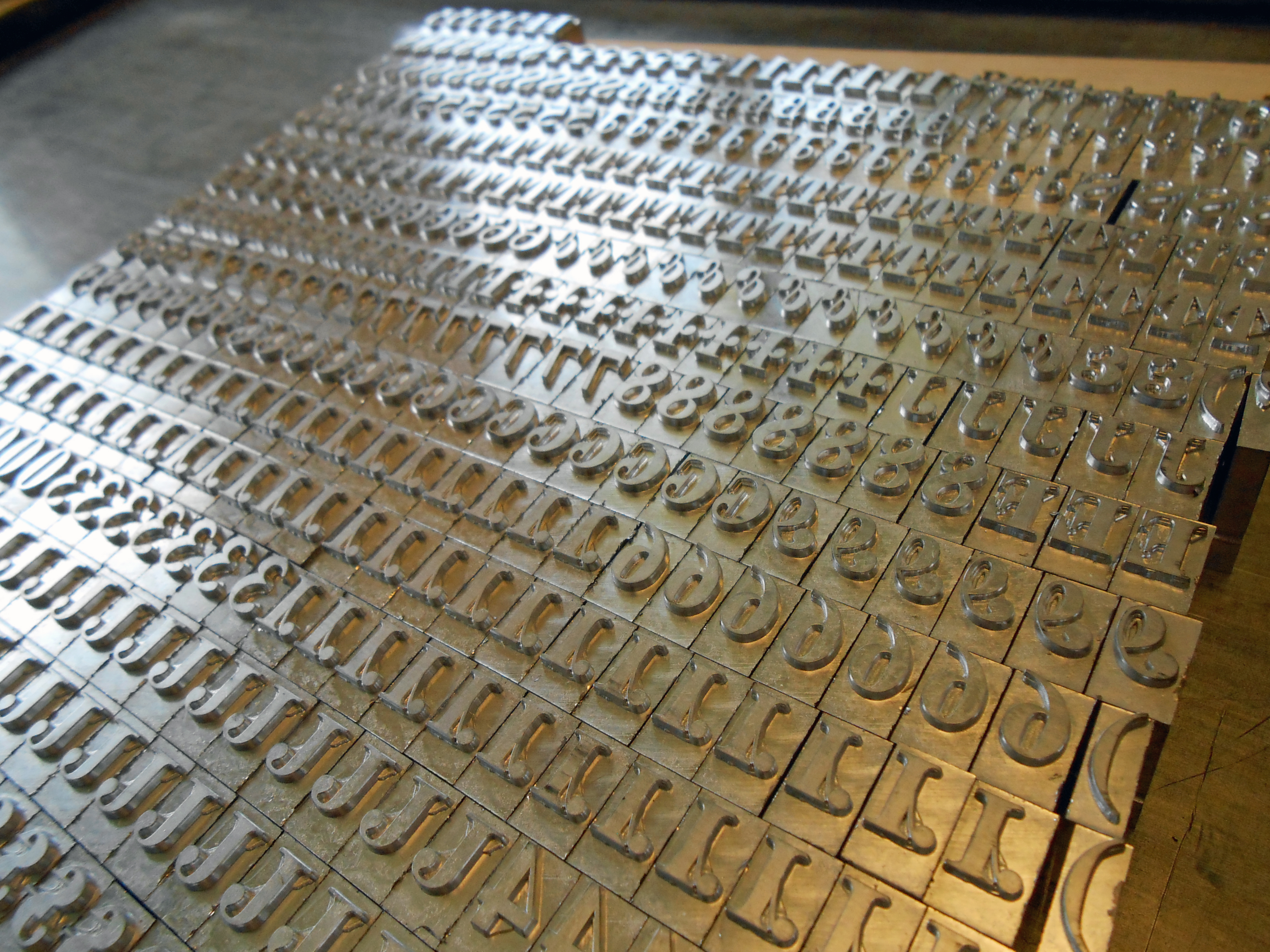
A close up view of the 36 pt Cherokee syllabary printing type. Syllabary mixed with standard numbers.

In addition to offering instruction in his own studio, Brannon has served as an adjunct instructor at several institutions including Southwestern Community College and Western Carolina University. Brannon also teaches letterpress, book binding, and paper-making workshops at regional art centers, including Asheville Bookworks, Penland School of Crafts, and John C. Campbell Folk School. He has presented papers and lectures on the subject of Cherokee language printing at a number of conferences and venues.

=== Cherokee syllabary printing type ===
Brannon's work with the Oconaluftee Institute for Cultural Arts (later Southwestern Community College) resulted in revitalizing letterpress printing in Cherokee syllabary. The project began in late 2009 and culminated in 2014 with the arrival of the final set of 36 point type. This work has helped facilitate the production of limited edition, one-of-a-kind books and prints in the Cherokee language.

The Cherokee language in a written form (known as the Cherokee syllabary) was developed by Sequoyah in the early 19th century. This resulted in the Cherokee quickly becoming literate in their own language and then printing the first newspaper in an indigenous language, the Cherokee Phoenix, in 1828. In the events leading up the Trail of Tears, the printing press was seized by the Georgia Guard and the type disappeared. The revitalization of Cherokee syllabary printing type marks the first time in 175 years that the Cherokee language was available for use in letterpress printing in the eastern United States.

=== Books ===
==== Cherokee Phoenix: Advent of a Newspaper ====
The Print Shop of the Cherokee Nation 1828-1834, with a Chronology; 4 x 6.5 inches, 105 pages, 2005. Edition of 74.

Hand-bound, letterpress printed on handmade cotton paper using 11-point Garamond types, including muslin spine with handmade paper covered boards. Brannon modeled the binding style after three circa 1830 books. The regular edition includes full size reproductions of the hand impressions of excavated New Echota type. Six deluxe copies of the edition, specially bound in red quarter-leather, contained hand impressions of type found at New Echota. Both version contains Notes, Chronology, and Bibliography.

Letterpress, limited edition book describing the advent of the Cherokee Phoenix newspaper in New Echota; last capital of the Cherokee Nation in the eastern United States. New information reveals the exact type of printing press used, and an initial exploration of metal type that was excavated in 1954 at New Echota. The likely location of the paper mill in Knoxville, Tennessee, which produced paper for the first issue of the Phoenix, is also described. Hand bound and printed on handmade cotton paper.

==== Cathleen A. Baker's The Paste Papers of Louise Lawrence Foster ====
9.125x.25x6.0 inches, 54 pages, 2011. Edition of 82.

Limited edition letterpress sample book presenting and describing 14 examples of the paste papers of artist Louise Lawrence Foster. Printed on handmade cotton paper with quarter-cloth and paste paper covers. 10 deluxe copies of the edition feature a quarter leather spine.
