= Boudinot =

Boudinot is a given name and surname. People with this name include:

== Given name ==
- Boudinot Currie Atterbury (1852–1930), American doctor and missionary in China

== Surname ==
- Elias Boudinot (1740–1821), American revolutionary and President of the Continental Congress
- Elias Boudinot (Cherokee) (1802–1839), Cherokee Indian journalist and publisher
- Harriet R. Gold Boudinot (1805–1836), wife of Elias Boudinot the journalist
- Elias Cornelius Boudinot (1835–1890), Confederate Colonel and Congressman from Arkansas
- Ryan Boudinot (born 1972), American writer
