= Harriet R. Gold Boudinot =

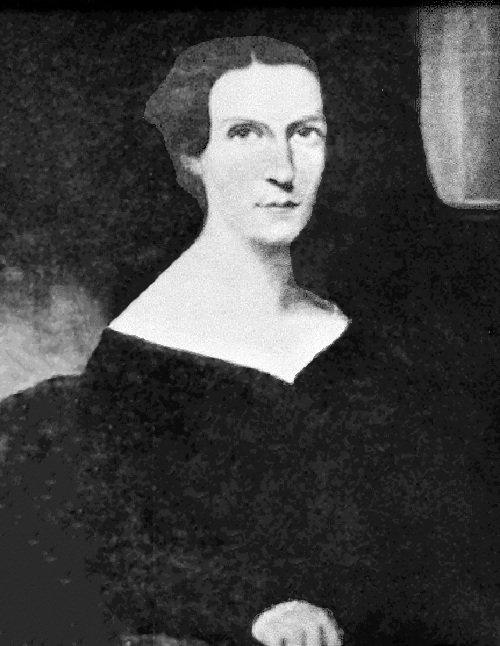
Harriet Ruggles Gold Boudinot

Harriet Ruggles Gold Boudinot (1805–1836) was notable as the wife of Cherokee Elias Boudinot (Buck Watie), who became a leader in the Cherokee Nation and editor of its newspaper The Cherokee Phoenix. Harriett was the youngest of fourteen children of Colonel Benjamin and Eleanor Gold of Cornwall, Connecticut; they were a prominent Congregationalist family of English descent.

The announcement of the Gold-Boudinot engagement, about a year after another interracial marriage in Cornwall, caused scandal and protest in the town. Both Cherokee men were from the elite of their nation and met their future wives while in Cornwall as students at the Foreign Mission School. Boudinot and Gold were married on March 28, 1826, at the Gold home. They moved to Boudinot's home of New Echota in present-day Georgia, where they had six children before Harriett's death in 1836.

== Early life and education ==
Harriet was born June 1, 1805, or June 10, 1805, the youngest of fourteen children born to Benjamin and Eleanor Gold, part of an affluent and politically connected family in Cornwall. Her grandfather was Hezekiah Gold, a Congregationalist minister of the First Church of Cornwall. He graduated from Yale University.

Colonel Benjamin Gold, Harriet's father, was a representative to the General Assembly and routinely traveled to Hartford or New Haven on government affairs. He was a deacon in the local ministry and had helped found the Foreign Mission School. Harriet's brother Ruggles Gold, also a Yale graduate, played a role in the school's founding as well. The family was closely connected with its missionary interests; Harriett's older sisters, Mary and Flora, had married an agent and the assistant principal of the school, respectively.

Elias Boudinot, of Cherokee and European ancestry, enrolled in the Foreign Mission School in 1818. Two years later he was baptized in the Christian faith. He had studied at a Moravian mission school in New Echota, Georgia. Elias and other students were frequent guests at the Gold home. Harriett, as well as her brothers and sisters, engaged in correspondence with several of the Cherokee students, even after they had departed from Cornwall. She and her brother Franklin both wrote to Boudinot. Catherine, a young Cherokee girl, exchanged letters with Harriett and her sister Flora.

== Marriage and family ==
In 1822, Boudinot became ill and unable to complete his schooling; he returned to the Cherokee Nation. He and Harriett began a correspondence; it added to their courtship and their love for one another grew.

=== Ridge-Northrup marriage ===
Boudinot's cousin John Ridge, also a student of the Foreign Mission School, in 1825 married Sarah Bird Northrup, a young local woman. This provoked scandal and racist comments. Isaiah Bruce, the editor of a Litchfield paper, the American Eagle, published criticism. He wrote that the match was

“the fruit of the missionary spirit and caused by the conduct of the clergymen at that place and its vicinity who are agents of the school.” He added, it was an “affliction, mortification, and disgrace of the relatives of the young woman... who has thus made herself a squaw, and connected her race to a race of Indians.” Bruce mocked the white men of Cornwall, saying they were “cast into the shade by their colored and tawny rivals.”

The Golds and seven other Cornwall families took Bruce to task in letters published in the Connecticut Journal in August 1825. Benjamin Gold was especially outraged by Bruce's remarks.

=== Boudinot-Gold marriage ===
Later that year, Harriet asked for her father's permission to marry Boudinot. She was nineteen years old. She did not want to continue the correspondence with Boudinot without the promise of marriage. As her parents tried to talk Harriett out of her wish, she grew ill, “hovering between life and death.” Her cousin Dr. Samuel Gold felt the outlook was bleak. Her brothers and sisters watched as Harriett grew weaker, unaware of what was causing her illness. Benjamin Gold finally reconsidered his decision. Her sister Mary describes her parents' reasoning: “that they might be found against God—and some time during H[arriet]'s sickness they told her they should oppose her no longer, she must do what she thought best.” Gold wrote to Elias of his change of heart, but difficulties remained.

The Reverend Joseph Harvey of Goshen, Connecticut, an influential agent of the Foreign Mission School, met with Harriet. He said that if she decided not to marry Elias, the whole matter could be kept secret. If she persisted, he would publish banns relating to the marriage. She said that her life calling was as a missionary and it could best be achieved by marrying Boudinot.

Her family worried about Harriet when the town learned the news. Learning of Harriet's decision, her brother Stephen wrote: “the die is cast, Harriet is gone, we have reason to fear.” Having been especially close to Stephen, who was just 18 months older than she, Harriet was distressed to see him lead a mob in burning effigies of her and Boudinot. He also threatened Boudinot's life.

The church choir mourned Harriet as if she were dead, and wore black sashes on their arms. Communion at the church was postponed during the turmoil. Gold became isolated from the townspeople, and family who tried to change her mind. She wrote of her decision,

“We have vowed, and our vows are heard in heaven; color is nothing to me; his soul is as white as mine; he is a Christian, and ever since I embraced religion I have been praying that God would open a door for me to be a missionary, and this is the way.”

Harriet married Boudinot in the Gold home on March 28, 1826; a minister from Goshen officiated.

== Life in New Echota ==
Shortly after their wedding, the Boudinots moved to his house in New Echota. It was a seven-room, two-storied house, with glass windows, signs of refinement admired by their visitors. The Cherokee gave Harriet the name Kalahdee.

The Boudinots had six children: Eleanor Susan; Mary Harriett; William Penn; Sarah Parkhill; Elias Cornelius; and Franklin Brinsmade Boudinot. Five married and had families of their own. When looking back on six years of marriage, Harriett wrote to her sister Flora:

“I look back to [my wedding] day with pleasure, and with gratitude. Yes I am thankful. I remember the trials I had to encounter—the thorny path I had to tread, the bitter cup I had to drink—but a consciousness of doing right—a kind and affectionate devoted husband, together with many other blessings have made amends for all. Truly I have, ere this, entered upon the 'sober realities of married life',—and if tears have been shed for me on that account—I can now pronounce them useless tears.”

The Boudinot family was well liked by the Cherokee community, and were visited by friends from the North. While her husband was active in the Cherokee community and in the struggle to gain Cherokee rights, Harriett was rearing several children born close together. In her letters home, she often expressed her concerns for Indian welfare in political terms; this contrasts with the religious arguments she had used to persuade her family to accept her engagement. Her letters demonstrated her deep sympathy with the Cherokee people, of whom she felt a part.

== Legacy ==
Harriett died August 15, 1836, months after her seventh child was stillborn in May. The New York Observer wrote about her several months later. She was ill for several weeks, and some sources attribute it to complications from childbirth. During this period, Harriett suffered but shared her last hopes with her children. Boudinot recorded her words: “It has been my sole wish and prayed to God ... that you may become christians, and be useful in the world, and finally be happy in the world to come.”

Traditionally, the Cherokee had a matrilineal kinship system; children belonged to their mother's clan and gained their status within it; chiefs were selected by their mothers' clans. The mother's brothers, not the biological father, were the role models for male children. With the coming of Europeans, an increasing number of Cherokee women took white spouses. Generally, the white man, usually a fur trader, would live with his wife in Cherokee Nation after their marriage; these were strategic marriages for both the Cherokee and Europeans, to strengthen trade alliances. The children were considered Cherokee and members of the mother's clan. They were reared within the Cherokee culture. The matrilineal structure meant that children of the rare unions between Cherokee fathers and white mothers had no official social or political place in the Nation.

In 1825, following Ridge's marriage, the Cherokee Nation passed a law that children born to Cherokee fathers and white mothers were “entitled to all the immunities and privileges enjoyed by citizens descending from the Cherokee race, by the mother's side.” In her book, To Marry an Indian: The Marriage of Harriett Gold and Elias Boudinot in Letters 1823-1839, Theresa Strouth Gaul wrote that the law was inspired by Ridge's marriage and Boudinot's engagement, as they came from prominent families, and the nation wanted to protect the status of their children. At the time, European Americans generally opposed marriage between white women and non-European men; they were less concerned about the unions or marriages of white men with non-European women. These had been taking place since the beginning of the colonies. The Cherokee had differing opinions on these interracial marriages; some thought it was a useful way to strengthen alliances with the European Americans, and others thought it meant a cultural loss.

A decade after Boudinot and Harriett married, he and several other Cherokee leaders of the Treaty Party signed the Treaty of New Echota in 1835 with the U.S. Government. Signatories included John Ridge. They believed that removal to Indian Territory was inevitable and sought to make the best deal for the nation to protect its future. Their decision and the treaty was opposed by a majority of the Nation, many chiefs of the National Council, and the Principal Chief John Ross. The treaty Cherokee leaders agreed to cede their lands in Cherokee Nation (Georgia, Alabama, Tennessee and North Carolina) and relocate to Indian Territory. When most of the people refused to migrate, the U.S. Army removed them forcibly in what is called “The Trail of Tears" in 1838.

Harriet died in 1836. After that, Boudinot moved with their children to Indian Territory. In 1839 he and three other treaty leaders were assassinated there by opponents of the 1835 Treaty, as by tribal law it was a capital crime to give up the Cherokee traditional communal lands.

The orphaned Boudinot children were sent to their mother's Gold family in Connecticut, where they were raised and given European-American educations. After completing education up to age 18, son Elias Cornelius Boudinot returned to the West, settling in Fayetteville, Arkansas. He "read the law" and was admitted to the bar in 1856; he set up his practice there. He became very active in Cherokee political affairs, as well as with the Democratic Party in Arkansas Territory.

== Sources ==
- Austen, Barbara. “Marrying Red: Indian/White Relations and the Case of Elias Boudinot and Harriet Gold,” Connecticut History 45 (Fall 2006): 256–260.
- Barnes, Linus. A Forbidden Cornwall Marriage. Sharon Historical Society Newsletter. May, 2022.
- “The Death of Harriet Gold Boudinot,” Journal of Cherokee Studies 4.2 (1979): 102–106.
- Gabriel, Ralph Henry. Elias Boudinot Cherokee and His America. Norman: University of Oklahoma Press, 1941.
- Gaul, Theresa Strouth, Ed. To Marry an Indian: The Marriage of Harriett Gold and Elias Boudinot in Letters, 1823-1839. Chapel Hill: The University of North Carolina Press, 2005.
- Parins, James W. John Rollin Ridge: His Life and Works. Lincoln: U of Nebraska Press, 1991.
- Perdue, Theda. Cherokee Editor: The Writings of Elias Boudinot. Knoxville: University of Tennessee Press, 1983.
- Starr, Edward C. A History of Cornwall, Connecticut: A Typical New England Town. New Haven: Tuttle, Morehouse, and Taylor, 1926.
- Wilkins, Thurman. Cherokee Tragedy: The Ridge Family and the Decimation of a People, Norman: U of Oklahoma Press, 1986.
- Yarbough, Fay. “Legislating Women's Sexuality: Cherokee Marriage Laws,” Journal of Social History 38 (2004): 385–406.
