= New Echota =

House that is US National Historic Landmark

- U.S. National Register of Historic Places
- U.S. National Historic Landmark District
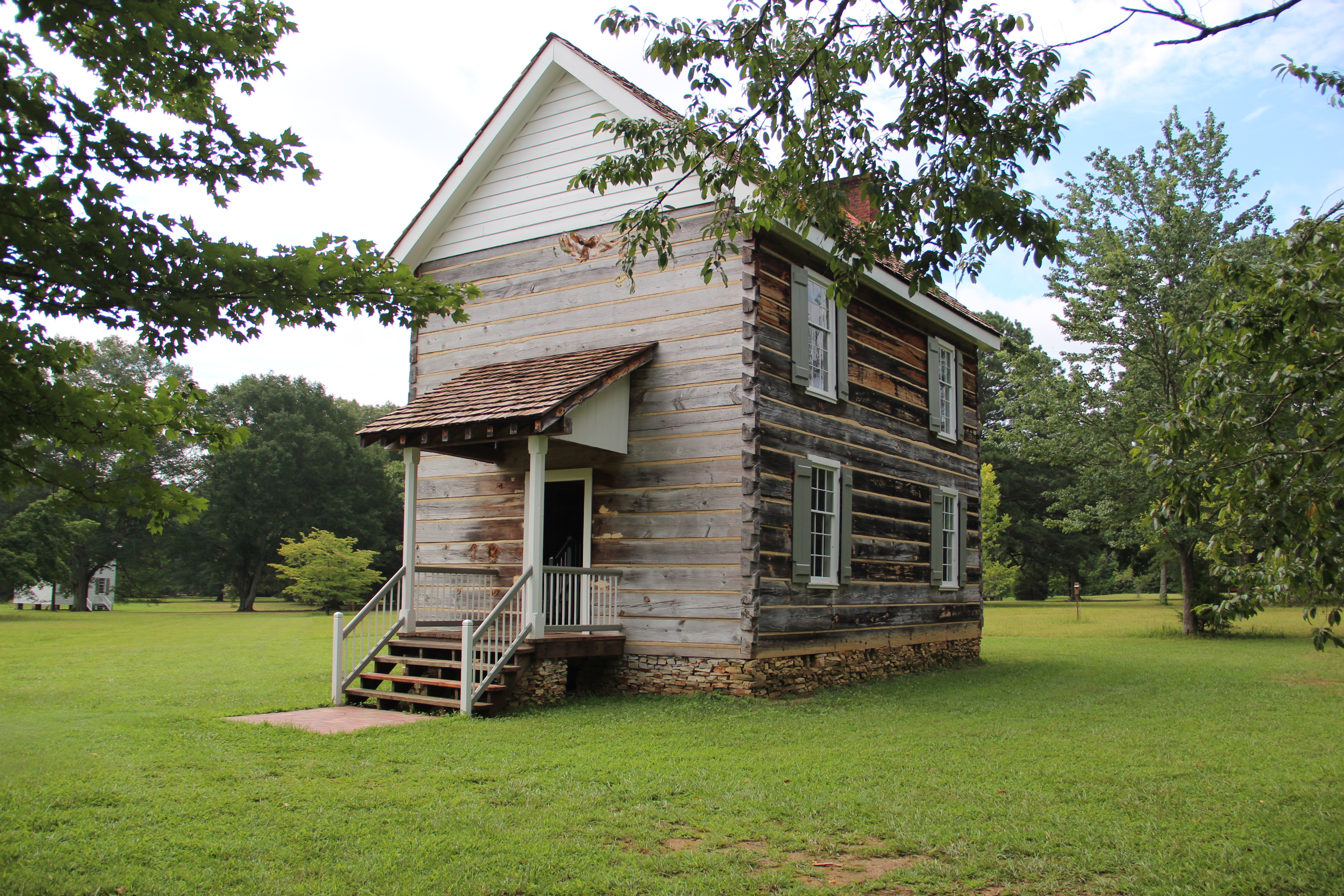
- The New Echota Council House. The building in this photo is a reconstruction of the original Council House.

- Location within Georgia Location within the United States
- Location: 1211 Chatsworth Hwy.
- Nearest city: Calhoun, Georgia and Resaca, Georgia
- Coordinates: 34°32′22″N 84°54′31″W
- Area: 200 acres (81 ha)
- Built: 1825–1849
- Architect: Cherokees
- Architectural style: Domestic style architecture
- NRHP reference No.: 70000869

Significant dates
- Added to NRHP: May 13, 1970
- Designated NHLD: November 7, 1973

New Echota was the capital of the Cherokee Nation in the Southeastern United States from 1825 until their forced removal in the late 1830s. New Echota is located in present-day Gordon County, in northwest Georgia, north of Calhoun. It is south of Resaca, next to present day New Town, known to the Cherokee as ᎤᏍᏔᎾᎵ, Ustanali. The site has been preserved as a state park and a historic site. It was designated a National Historic Landmark District in 1973.

The site is at the confluence of the Coosawattee and Conasauga rivers, which join to form the Oostanaula River, a tributary of the Coosa River. Archeological evidence has shown that the site of New Echota had been occupied by ancient indigenous cultures for thousands of years prior to the Cherokee. It was known as ᎦᎾᏌᎩᏱ, Gansagiyi or ᎦᎾᏌᎩ, Gansagi. The Cherokee renamed it New Echota in 1825 after making it the capital, in honor of their former chief town of Chota, based along the lower Little Tennessee River as one of the Overhill towns on the west side of the Appalachian Mountains.

== History ==
Prior to relocating to Gansagi and building the community of New Echota, the Cherokee had used the nearby town of Ustanali on the Coosawattee River as the seat of their tribe, beginning in 1788. They had migrated south from eastern Tennessee and western South Carolina under pressure from European-American settlement. New Echota was the starting point of the Trail of Tears.

Ustanali had been established in 1777 by refugees from the Cherokee Lower Towns in northwestern South Carolina. In that year, Old Tassel and several other Cherokee leaders were murdered by whites while under the flag of truce, while visiting representatives of the short-lived State of Franklin in present-day Tennessee. In response, warriors across the frontier increased attacks on European-American settlers. The Chickamauga Cherokee, a band led by Dragging Canoe, were already carrying out armed resistance to European-American settlement along the Holston River in northeastern Tennessee.

Following the murders, Little Turkey was elected a chief of the Cherokee, although they did not have a centralized form of government. The Overhill Cherokee moved the seat of the Cherokee council from Chota to Ustanali. New Echota was named after Chota, the former capital of the Overhill Cherokee, those who lived to the west of the Appalachian Mountains and had previously had numerous towns along the lower Little Tennessee River.

A common English name for New Echota was "Newtown" or "New Town." These names are still used for the area around the state park. Later Anglo-American settlers called the area "The Fork" and "Fork Ferry" because of early transportation at the confluence of the rivers.

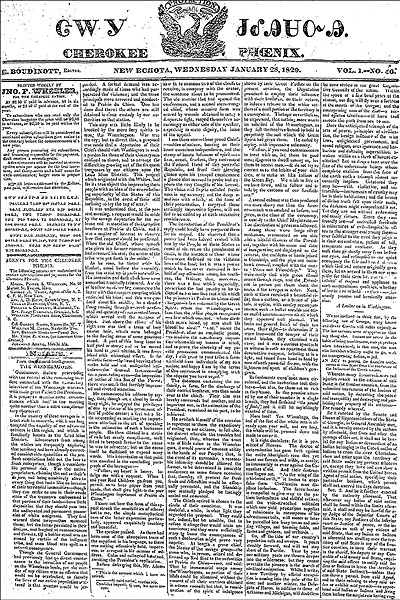
The Cherokee Phoenix

By 1819 the government of the Cherokee Nation was meeting in New Echota. On November 12, 1825, the Cherokee Nation officially designated New Echota as their capital. They had organized a council and a supreme court to adjudicate their justice issues. The tribal council began a building program that included construction of a two-story Council House and a Supreme Court.

Later they built the office (printer shop) for the Cherokee Phoenix, the first Indian-language and Cherokee newspaper. Elias Boudinot was the chief writer and editor. Samuel Worcester, a missionary and printer, laid out the first Native American newspaper. Boudinot wrote it in both English and Cherokee, using for the latter the new syllabary created in 1820 by Sequoyah, with type cast by Worcester. Private homes, stores, a ferry, and mission station were built in the outlying area of New Echota.

The town was quiet most of the year, but council meetings provided the opportunity for great social gatherings. During these meetings, the town filled with several hundred Cherokee, who arrived by foot, horseback, or in stylish carriages.

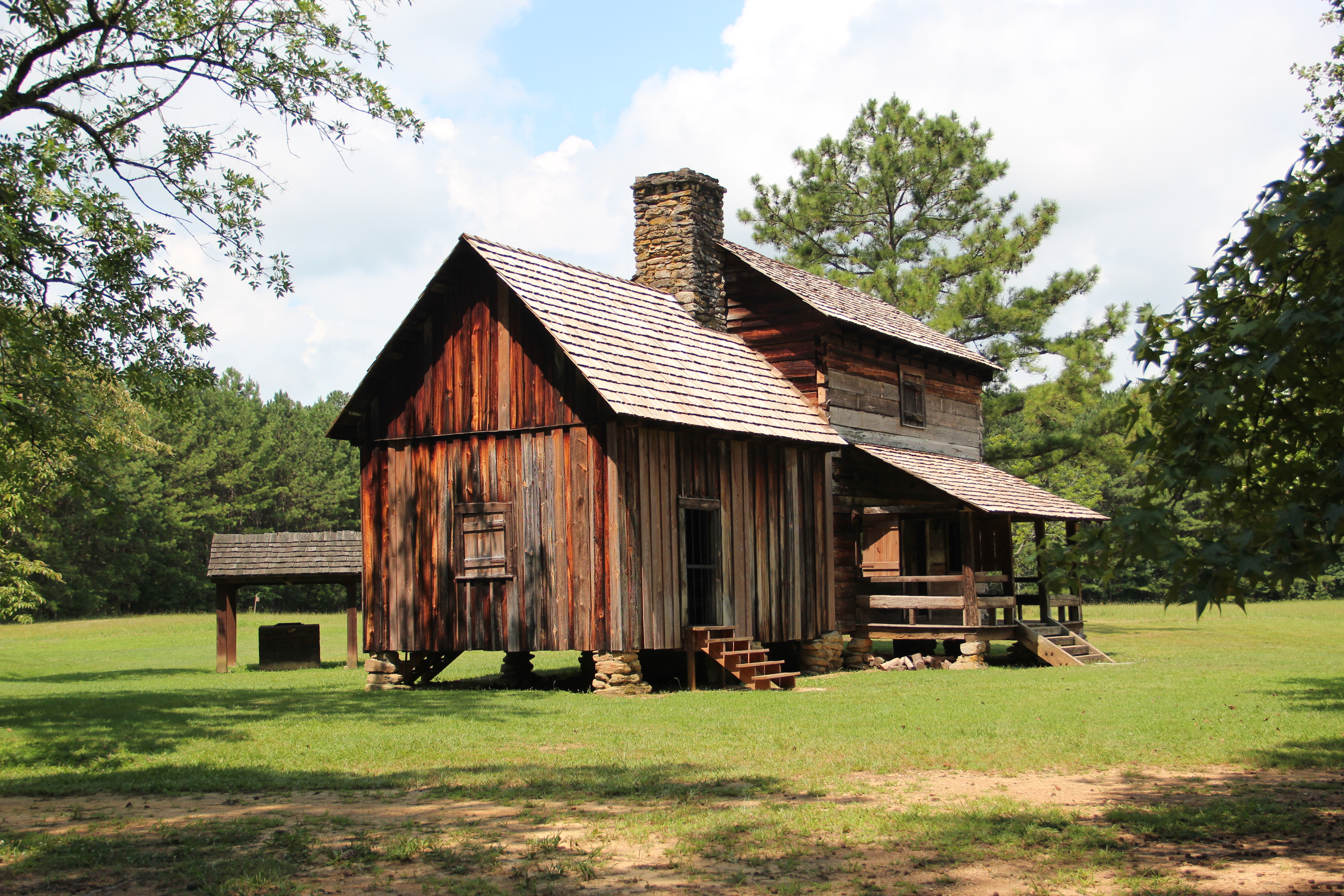
Vann's Tavern, a tavern built by James Vann. Relocated to New Echota in 1955.

In 1832, after Congressional passage of the Indian Removal Act, Georgia included Cherokee territory in its Sixth Land Lottery, allocating Cherokee land to European-American (white) settlers. But the Cherokee Nation had never ceded the land to the state. Although the US Supreme Court upheld the Cherokee right to their land, Georgia continued to press for them to cede it. Over the next six years, the Georgia Guard operated against the Cherokee, evicting them from their properties. By 1834, New Echota was becoming a ghost town. Council meetings were moved to Red Clay, Cherokee Nation (now Tennessee). The United States urged the Cherokee to remove to Indian Territory, offering lands in exchange for their lands in Georgia.

On December 29, 1835, a small group of Cherokee (100–500 Cherokee known as Ridgeites or the Treaty Party, who represented a minority of Cherokee) signed the Treaty of New Echota in the home of Elias Boudinot. Signers included Major Ridge, John Ridge, and Andrew Ross, a brother of John Ross, the principal chief. Believing that the negotiation would allow them to preserve some rights for the Cherokee, they agreed to cede their remaining lands and to removal in exchange for lands west of the Mississippi River. The Cherokee were to have sovereignty in that western territory. Despite objections from John Ross, who represented the large majority of Cherokee to the US government, the Senate ratified the treaty. The US government eventually forced most of the Cherokee out of the southeast.

In 1838 the U.S. Army, under the command of Winfield Scott, began the forced removal of Cherokee from the state of Georgia. A Cherokee concentration camp was located at New Echota, called Fort Wool. This held Cherokee from Gordon and Pickens counties until their removal. As the first group of Cherokee began their exodus to Rattlesnake Springs, Cherokee Nation (4 miles south of Charleston, Tennessee), the Cherokee from counties south and east of the area also were housed here.

== Historic site ==
After the Cherokee were fully removed in 1838, their capital remained abandoned for more than 100 years. Many of the structures disappeared, though some of the houses continued to be used. Most notable was the house of Worcester, who was called "the Messenger," and who had served as a missionary to the Cherokee. When its landowners deeded land to be commissioned to the state for preservation, the Worcester house, the largest remaining structure, had been vacant for two years. It had deteriorated in that time.

From 1930 to 1950, the site was designated by Congress as the New Echota Marker National Memorial. In March 1954, archeologist Lewis Larsen from the Georgia Historical Commission and five associates were assigned to oversee the work of excavating New Echota. The team uncovered evidence of the Cherokee settlement as well as much earlier indigenous cultures. They asked National Park Service archeologist Joe Caldwell and two more workers to join them for the next two months as they continued excavation. The group recovered a Spanish coin dated 1802, crockery, household wares, bootery remains, a small quantity of lead, and 1,700 other artifacts. They identified 600 items as having belonged to the Cherokee. In addition to the standard finds and remains of many buildings, Larsen and Caldwell discovered much of the type syllabary that was once used to print the Cherokee Phoenix.

In 1957, following the news of these archeological finds, Georgia authorized reconstruction of the town of New Echota as a state park. They reconstructed such buildings as the Council House, the Supreme Court, the printer shop, a building of the Cherokee Phoenix, a common Cherokee cabin representing a home of an average family, and a middle-class Cherokee home, including outbuildings. Vann's Tavern, which had been owned by Chief James Vann, was restored. Modern nails and replacement wooden parts were used. It was relocated to the site from Forsyth County, Georgia (Chief Vann had owned 14 taverns across Georgia), as the original New Echota Vann Tavern had been destroyed. The park contains the site of the Boudinot house. The Worcester House was restored to its 19th-century condition. Together the buildings of the complex form an open-air museum. Other sites are not open to the public, as they are on private property. Across from the New Echota park are two farmhouse sites of that era, formerly owned by white men who had married Cherokee women. These sites are part of an Elks Club golf course.

The New Echota Historical Park was opened to the public in 1962. Inside the office of the Cherokee Phoenix were displayed 600 pieces of type which had been used for the first American Indian newspaper. Later some type was moved to the museum and research facility that was built by the park.

The Newtown Trail is a 1.2-mile interpreted trail that takes tourists to Town Creek (inside the center of New Echota). This is the area where the majority of Cherokee would camp when the council was in session. In 1973, the Department of Natural Resources, also known as Georgia State Parks and Historic Sites, took over New Echota Park. It continues to operate and maintain this historic site. In 1973, the site was designated by the US Department of Interior as a National Historic Landmark, the highest recognition in the United States. On February 10, 2019, the site was added to the Parks On The Air program.

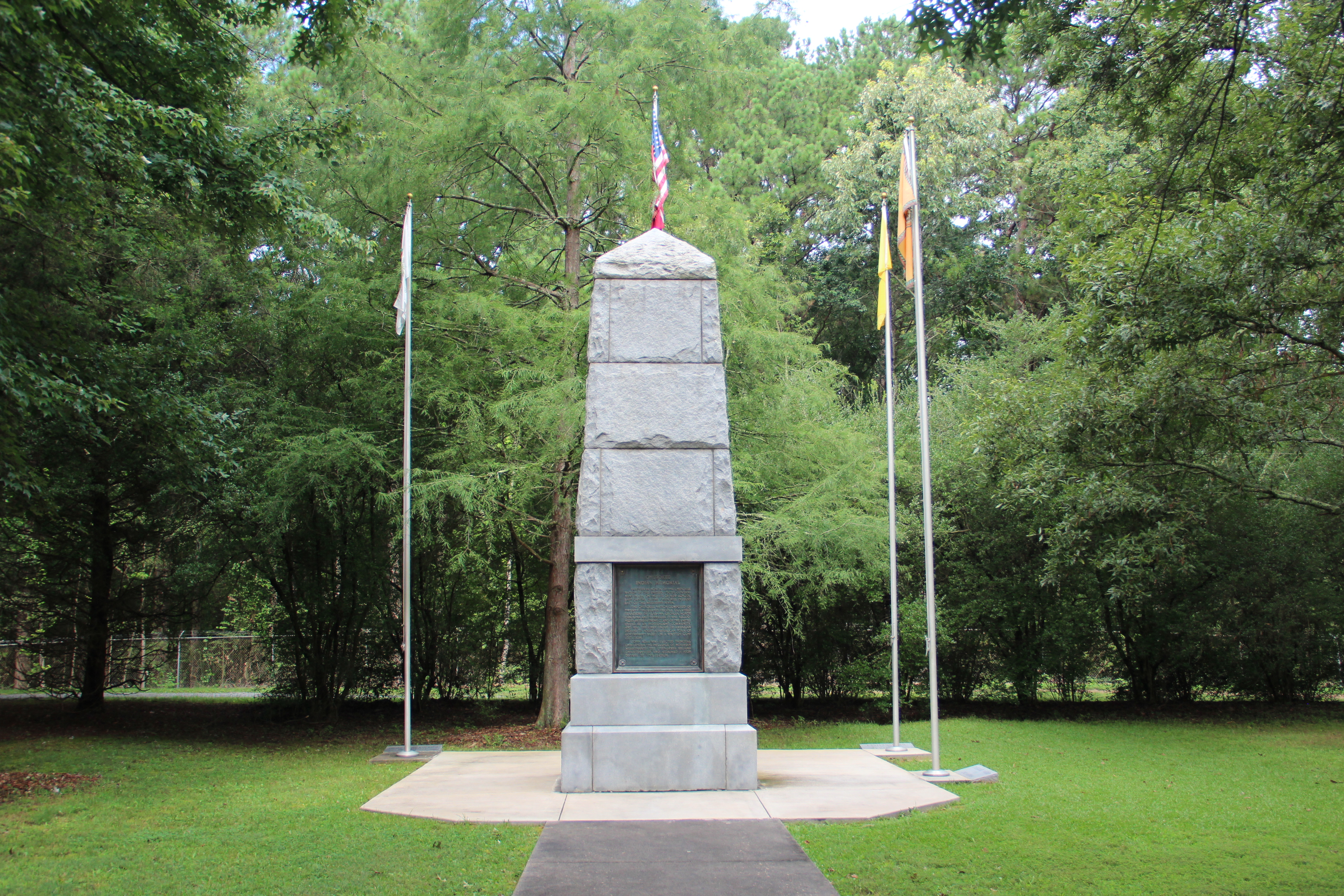
The monument on New Echota Historic Site honors those Cherokee who died on the Trail of Tears.

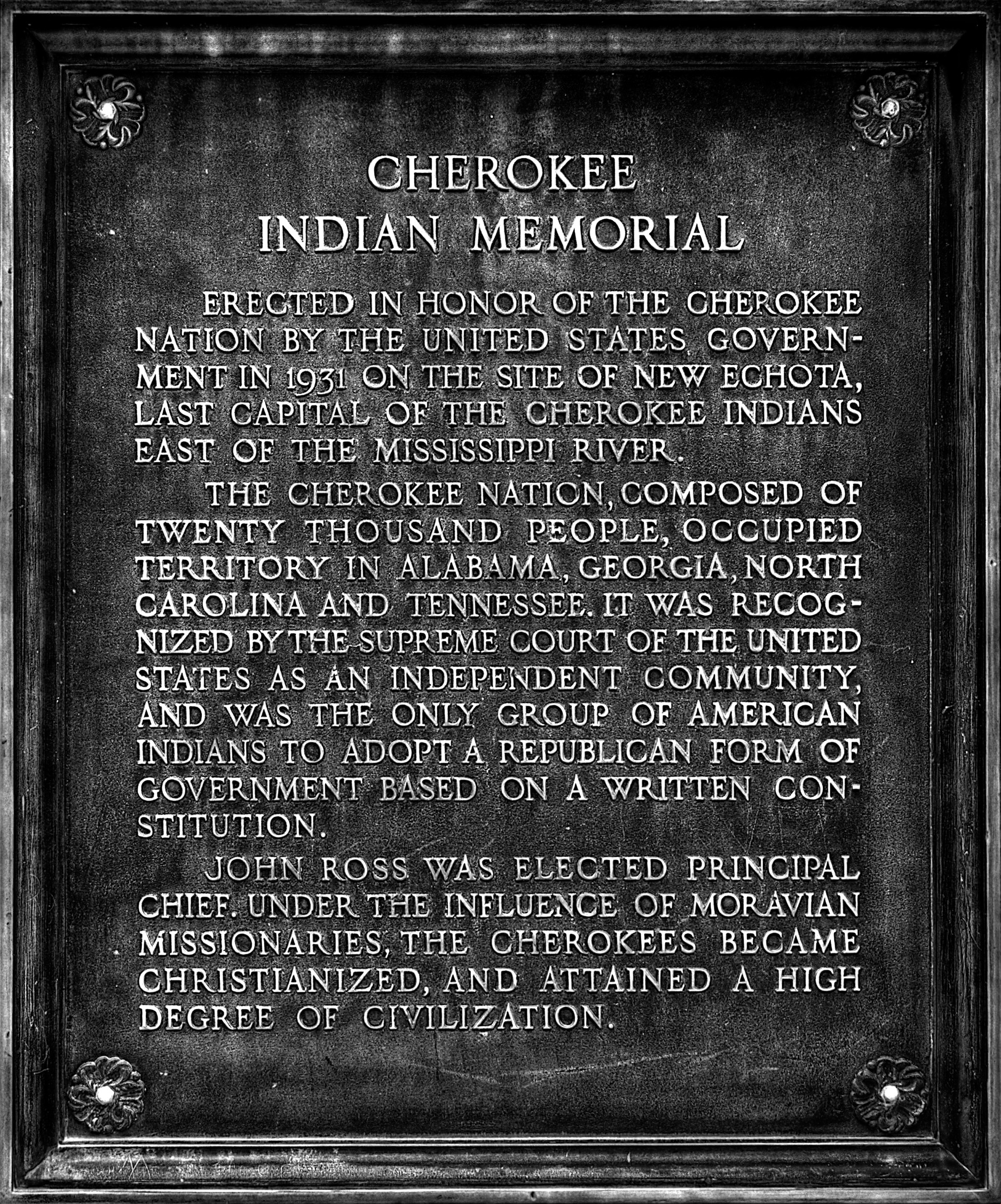
Detail of inscription on monument

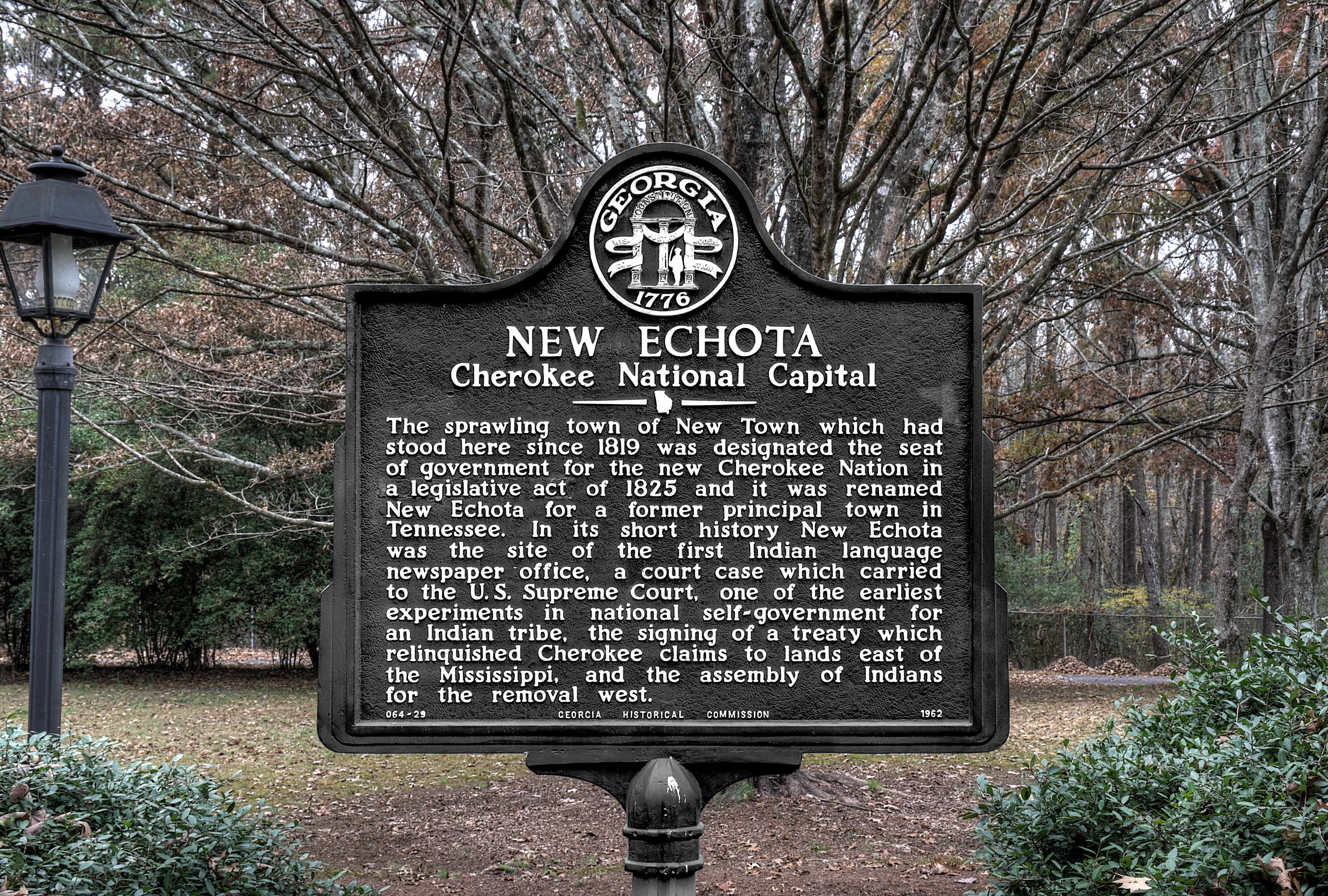
Historical marker

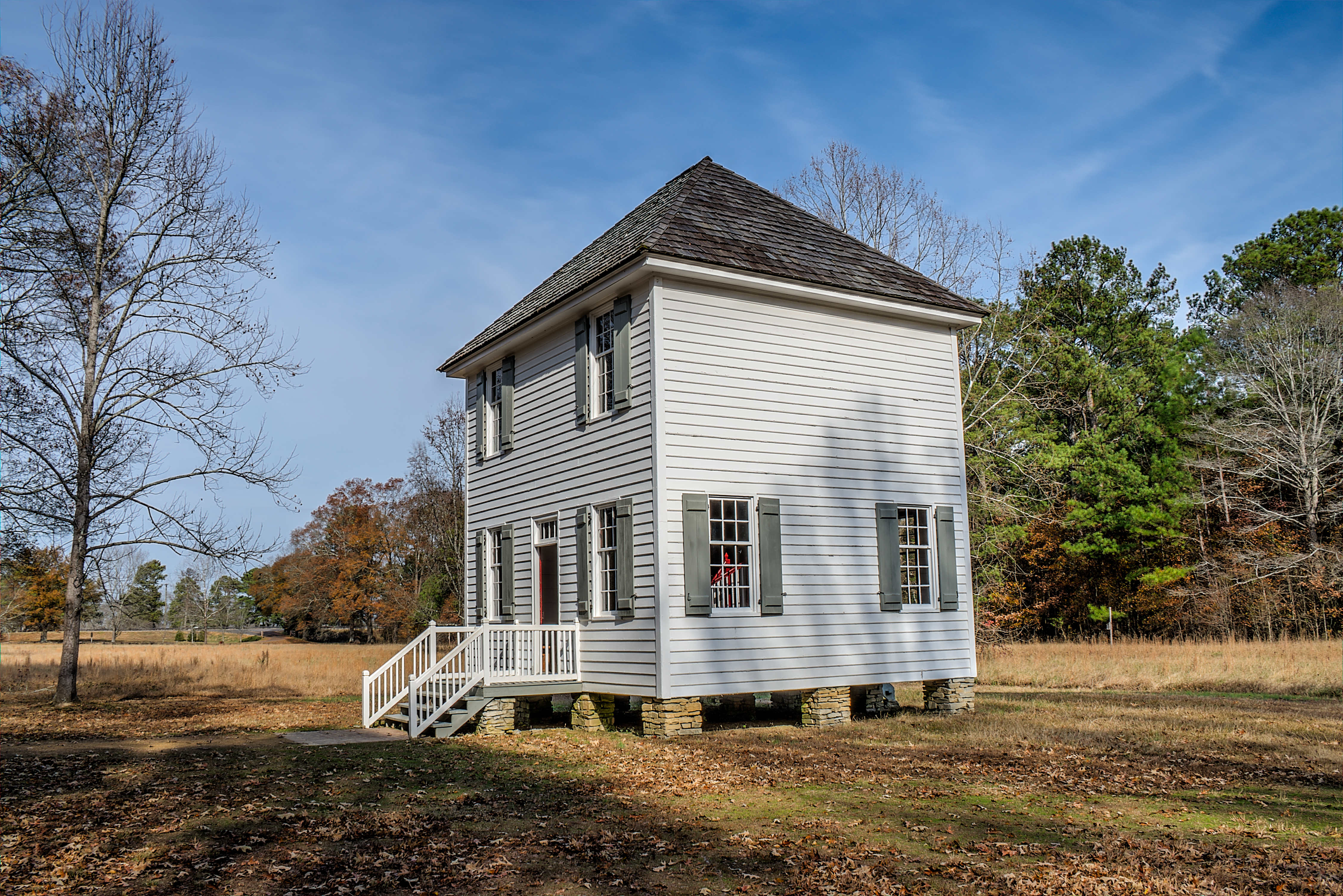
Reconstruction of Supreme Court

== See also ==
- List of National Historic Landmarks in Georgia (U.S. state)
- List of Georgia state parks
- National Register of Historic Places listings in Gordon County, Georgia
