= Foreign Mission School =

- Steward's House-Foreign Mission School
- U.S. National Register of Historic Places
- U.S. National Historic Landmark
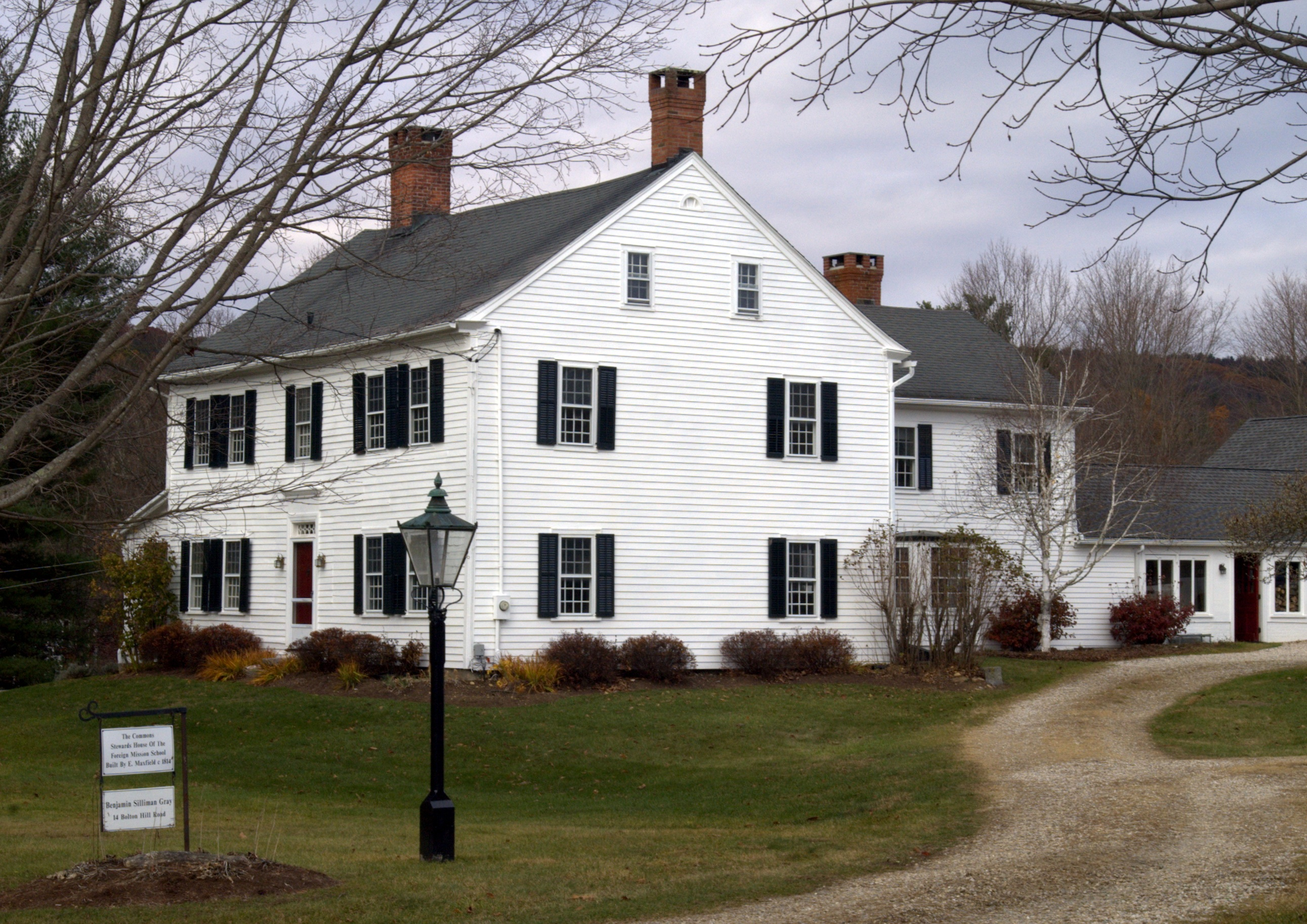
- The Steward's House of the Foreign Mission School

- Location within Connecticut Location within the United States
- Location: 14 Bolton Hill Road, Cornwall, Connecticut
- Coordinates: 41°50′40″N 73°19′57″W
- Area: 3 acres (1.2 ha)
- Built: 1817
- Architectural style: Federal
- NRHP reference No.: 16000858
- Added to NRHP: October 31, 2016

The Foreign Mission School was an educational institution which operated between 1817 and 1826 in Cornwall, Connecticut. It was established by the American Board of Commissioners for Foreign Missions. The ABCFM was focused on sending missionaries to non-Christian cultures, mostly overseas.

The school was intended to educate students of non-Christian cultures, including Native Americans, in Christianity and Western culture so that they might become missionaries and emissaries to their own peoples. It had students from Hawaii, India and East Asia, in addition to those of Native American tribes primarily from east of the Mississippi River.

== History ==
The school was called a seminary, "for the purpose of educating youths of Heathen nations, with a view to their being useful in their respective countries", according to Jedidiah Morse. The school was established in the last few months of 1816, and opened in May 1817. The first principal was Edwin Welles Dwight (1789–1841). After the first year, Dwight was replaced by Reverend Herman Daggett, who ran the school for the next six years.

Dwight was a distant cousin of the Yale president in 1817, Timothy Dwight IV. Daggett was nephew of Naphtali Daggett, who had been president of Yale College.

A total of approximately one hundred young men from Native American and other non-English indigenous peoples were trained at the school. The school's goal was for them to become missionaries, preachers, translators, teachers, and health workers in their native communities.

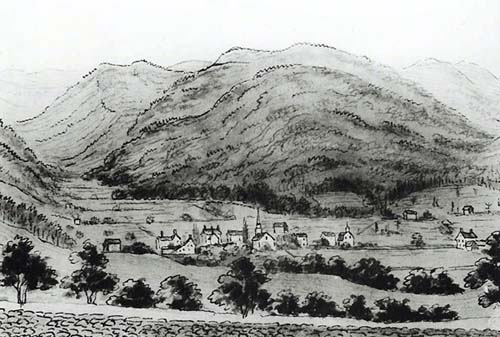
A sketch of the village by John Warner Barber (1835) shows the buildings used by the Foreign Mission School, to the right of the church at center.

According to Morse,

there belong to it (the school) a commodious edifice for the School, a good mansion house, with a barn, and other out-buildings, and a garden for the Principal; a house, barn, &. with a few acres of good tillage land for the Steward and Commons; all situated sufficiently near to each other; and eighty acres of excellent wood land, about a mile and a half distant.

In the constitution there is a provision, that youths of our own country, of acknowledged piety, may be admitted to the school, at their own expense, and at the discretion of the Agents.

Under the instruction of the able and highly respected Principal, the Rev. Mr. Daggett, and his very capable and faithful assistant, Mr. Prentice, the improvement of the pupils, in general, has been increasing and satisfactory, and in not a few instances, uncommonly good. Besides being taught in various branches of learning, and made practically acquainted with the useful arts of civilized life; they are instructed constantly, and with special care in the doctrines and duties of Christianity. Nor has this instruction been communicated in vain. Of the thirty-one Heathen youths . . . seventeen are thought to have given evidence of a living faith in the Gospel; and several others are very seriously thoughtful on religious concerns.

From its founding, the school rapidly became a symbol of American Protestant Christianity's Second Great Awakening and expansion of missionary efforts, especially in New England. It also connected the small farm town of Cornwall in Connecticut's Litchfield Hills to the early 19th century's clash of civilizations areas of interest to the US and Great Britain. It had students from Hawaii, India, and Southeast Asia, in addition to Native Americans. According to a 1929 article, Cornwall had been chosen as the site for the school because the town residents were believed committed to the missionary cause. They were thought ready to donate their efforts, money, and property to the cause.

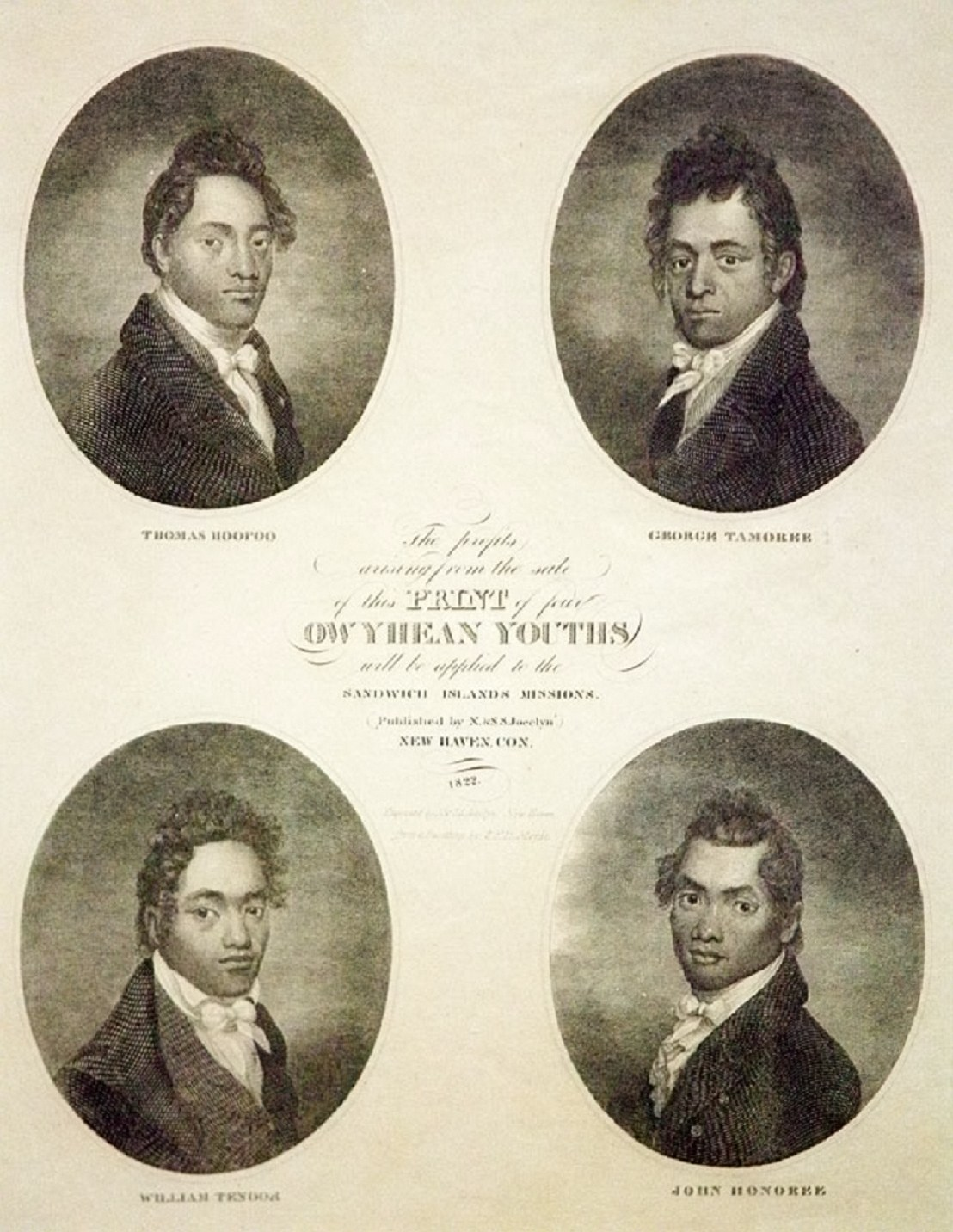
The Four Hawaiian Youths: Thomas Hoopoo, George Tamoree, William Tenooe, and John Honoree by S. F. B. Morse, 1816

Henry Opukahaia, the school's first pupil, was an 18-year-old Native Hawaiian who had been working as a sailor on a US merchant ship but was abandoned in 1810 in New Haven, Connecticut by his ship. He traveled widely to promote the school, but died in Cornwall in 1818 at 26 before he could return home. He recruited four more Hawaiians, including one known as George Prince, who reportedly had fought in the War of 1812. The school printed a pamphlet with their stories to raise money. Samuel F. B. Morse, son of Jedidiah, painted their portraits. Other students came from distant countries, as well as several Native American tribes, primarily from those east of the Mississippi River. Some 24 different native languages were spoken at the school.

In its first year, the school had twelve students; seven Hawaiians, one Hindu, one Bengali, a Native American, and two Anglo-Americans. By the second year, there were twenty-four; four Cherokee, two Choctaw, one Abenaki, six Hawaiians, two Chinese, two Malays, one Bengali, one Hindu, and two Marquesans, as well as three Anglo-Americans.

Principal Daggett observed in a letter to Morse that, in contrast to the Native American students, three of the students from the Pacific Islands had become ill and "fallen a sacrifice". He attributed their deaths to the different, colder climate. He mused that "it is probable, that Divine Providence intends this school to be chiefly useful to the Aborigines of this country."

The students followed a demanding schedule: in addition to mandatory church attendance, prayer, and 7 hours of daily coursework, they did field work, as the school raised much of its own food. The classical program of study included astronomy, calculus, theology, geography, chemistry, navigation and surveying, French, Greek, and Latin, in addition to practical courses such as blacksmithing and coopering.

== Local relationships and marriages ==
In time, public doubt began to build in Cornwall and the mission community about the purpose of the school, and support began to wane. But the major catalyst against it were the marriages of two Cherokee students (high-ranking cousins in their tribe) to local European-American girls. Concern about potential marriages of other such interracial couples generated strong animosity to the school among local residents.

Leaders of Native American tribes who sent their sons there had their own concerns. The Five Civilized Tribes of the Southeast, and others, had a matrilineal kinship system. Status and property passed through the maternal line. Therefore children born to Native fathers and white mothers would have no place in the tribe and would not be considered members. This jeopardized tribal leadership, as the young men sent for education were being groomed to become leaders in the tribes and continue to have major roles, along with their children.

After these two marriages, other interracial relationships developed, and at least two students were dismissed by the school. But local opposition grew: the school closed in 1826 or 1827, and townspeople burned it down.

== Native American students ==
Sons of some of the most prominent Native American leaders of the time were educated at the Foreign Mission School. They were often of mixed ancestry, typically with Native American mothers and white fathers, reflecting the tribal history of interaction with whites in the Southeast and unions with white traders and others. Because these tribes had matrilineal kinship systems, these youth were raised in the tribes, considered born to their mother's clan and people, whether Cherokee, Choctaw or other. Later, a number of such young men became distinguished leaders as adult members of their nations in the rising generation. Tribal leaders had wanted them to learn more about European Americans and their culture in order to prepare for such leadership roles.

In the fall of 1818 three Cherokee and a Choctaw youth enrolled in the school. In his report, Morse stated that there were twenty-nine students in the school in 1820, half of whom were Native American youths from the leading families of five or six different tribes.

Native American students include:

- David Brown (Cherokee, one-quarter white on his father's side); his half brother was a chief and judge. He assisted in developing a spelling book for the Cherokee as well as a Cherokee grammar. He later became a notable public speaker, studied Hebrew and divinity, and attended Andover School. A leader in the Cherokee nation, he served as clerk of a delegation to Congress.
- James Fields (Cherokee), a kinsman of Brown, became a planter and major landowner, known to take care "of his considerable property."
- Leonard Hicks was a son of Chief Charles Renatus Hicks, the first Cherokee to convert to Christianity, and considered the most influential man in his nation. After Leonard became homesick and left the school, he served as clerk of the Cherokee nation.
- Tah-wah (Cherokee, renamed David Carter) was a grandson of Nathaniel Carter of Killingworth and Cornwall. David's father (also named Nathaniel Carter) grew up in Pennsylvania. He and his sisters were taken captive as children by Cherokee after their parents were killed in the Wyoming Valley massacre c.1763. His sisters were ransomed and returned to family in Connecticut, but Nathaniel was adopted by a Cherokee family and became assimilated, remaining with the tribe. He married a Cherokee woman, and their children included Tah-wah, or David. David was dismissed from the school at the time of the marriage scandals. (see below). He later became an editor of the Cherokee Phoenix newspaper, the first established by a tribe, and a judge of the Cherokee Supreme Court. He died about 1863.
- John Vann (Cherokee) was the son of a European American, Clement Vann, and his Cherokee wife Mary Christiana, who had converted to Christianity. He attended FMS from 1820 to 1822. He also later served as an editor of the Cherokee Phoenix newspaper.
- McKee Folsom and Israel Folsom (Choctaw), sons of Nathaniel Folsom and a Choctaw wife, were the first Choctaw recorded at the school, which they attended from 1818 to 1822. Their family was very prominent in their nation. They later assisted in creating a Choctaw alphabet, preparing Choctaw school books, and translating the Scriptures to Choctaw.
- Adin C. Gibbs (Delaware), was from Pennsylvania and had white ancestry in his paternal line. He attended the school from 1818 to 1822. He later spent many years as a teacher and missionary among the Choctaw.
- Holbochinto (Osage, renamed as Robert Monroe), was a relative of Tally, Chief of the Osage Nation, which was still located in its traditional territory in what became Missouri. He attended the school from 1824 to 1826, financially supported by the Foreign Mission Society.
- Wah-che-oh-heh (Osage, renamed as Stephen Van Rensselaer, after General Stephen Van Rensselaer III, president of the United Foreign Mission Society which supported him financially) was also a relative of Chief Tally. He attended FMS from 1824 to 1825. He remained in Cornwall for a time after the school closed. He later studied at what is now Miami University in Ohio. In 1832 he was one of five alumni from FMS to act as missionary helper. Later he served his tribe as an interpreter and blacksmith.
- John Ridge (Cherokee), a student at the school in 1819, was a son of Major Ridge, who was a commander of Cherokee forces that were allied with the US in the Seminole War. Suffering from a problem with his hip, he was nursed for two years by the family of John P. Northrup, steward of the school. Ridge and a daughter of the family, Sarah Bird Northrup, married in 1824. This union was opposed by local citizens. Ridge subsequently became a prominent leader of the Cherokee nation.
- Kul-le-ga-nah (renamed Buck Watie. He chose the name Elias Boudinot after Elias Boudinot, who sponsored him at the school in 1818.) Boudinot calculated the date of the lunar eclipse of August 2, 1822, using only the information supplied in his textbook. He became engaged to marry Harriet R. Gold in 1825; she was another Cornwall girl. This marriage was bitterly opposed by the bride's family and the citizens of Cornwall, who burned the couple in effigy. They married nevertheless.
- Miles Mackey (Choctaw), had a white father. He attended the school from 1823 to 1825, and was dismissed "for a proposed matrimonial union", as was James Terrell (Osage).

Both Cornwall residents and leaders of the Native American nations generally opposed these marriages. But, the Cherokee recognized that times were changing. In order to ensure that the Ridge and Boudinot descendants would be members of the Cherokee nation, the Cherokee changed their rules of tribal membership to accommodate these marriages. Otherwise, in their matrilineal society, the children of these white mothers would not be considered Cherokee and would have no place in the tribe. The leaders had been grooming Ridge and Boudinot for leadership roles in the tribe. In addition to the marriage issue, leaders of some of the Southeastern tribes became concerned that residence in the northern states was harming the health of their students. Support for the school rapidly dwindled, until it was closed in 1826 or 1827.

== Legacy ==
The Foreign Mission School and the issues of interracial marriage (of white women by Cherokee men) was dramatized in an episode of the PBS American Experience television series in 2009.

In 2014 Yale historian John Demos published The Heathen School: A Story of Hope and Betrayal in the Age of the Early Republic, a historical narrative about the school that included modern perspectives about the cultural issues.

The Steward's House, the only relatively unaltered remnant of the school's historic Cornwall campus, is now a private residence. In 2016 it was designated a National Historic Landmark in recognition of the school's significance.

== See also ==
- National Register of Historic Places listings in Litchfield County, Connecticut
- List of National Historic Landmarks in Connecticut
