= Louise Lawrence Foster =

American paper marbler (1944–2020)

- Born: January 16, 1944; Tuscaloosa, Alabama
- Died: February 29, 2020 (aged 76); Tuscaloosa, Alabama
- Known for: Paper craft

Louise Lawrence "Larry Lou" Foster (1944 – 2020) was an American paper marbler, book artist, book binder, and educator. She was born on January 16, 1944, in Tuscaloosa, Alabama. Foster attended Auburn University, George Washington University, and University of Alabama.

Foster conducted workshops on paper marbling and paste paper at many locations, including Asheville BookWork and the Center for Book Arts. She taught bookbinding as an adjunct professor at Pensacola Junior College and then at its successor, Pensacola State College.

Foster died on February 29, 2020, in Tuscaloosa.

Her work was included in the 2023 exhibition Pattern and Flow: A Golden Age of American Decorated Papers, 1960s-2000s at the Grolier Club and in the Paper Legacy Project at the Thomas J. Watson Library at the Metropolitan Museum of Art.
