= Major Ridge =

Cherokee leader (d. 1839)

- ᎦᏅᏓᏞᎩ
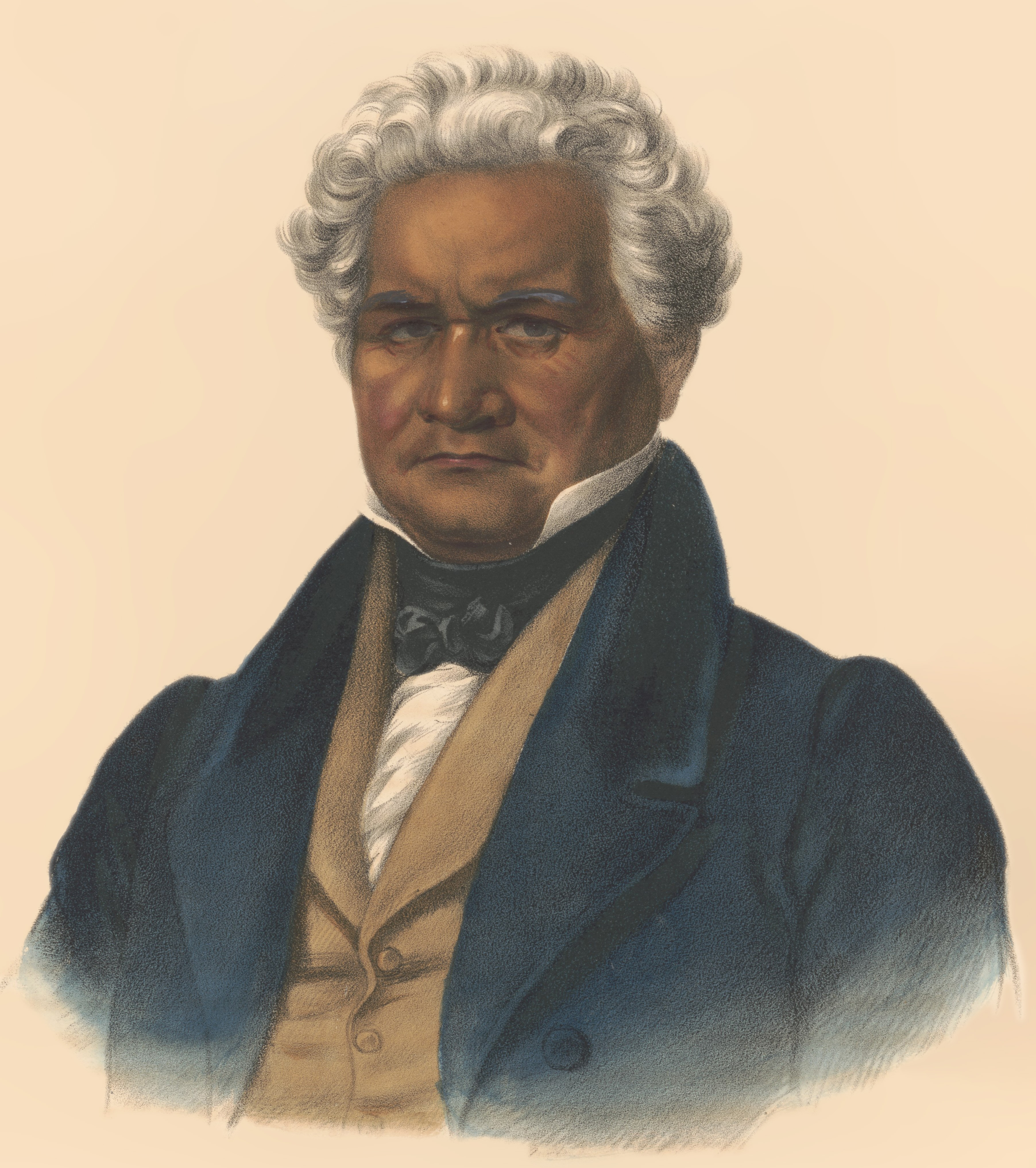
- Portrait by Charles Bird King, 1834
- Born: 1771, exact date unknown Great Hiwassee, present-day Tennessee
- Died: June 22, 1839 (aged 67 or 68); White Rock Creek, Little Branch Creek near White Rock Cemetery, Washington County, AR
- Cause of death: Assassination
- Citizenship: Cherokee Nation (1794–1907)
- Occupation: Cherokee Leader
- Spouse(s): Sehoyah (Susannah Catherine Wickett); Kate Parris
- Children: John Ridge; Sarah (Sally) Ridge

The Ridge, later known as Major Ridge (c. 1771 – 22 June 1839; known in Cherokee as Nunnehidihi, and later Ganundalegi) (Note: Cherokee: ᎦᏅᏓᏞᎩ, romanized: Ganvdatlegi) was a Cherokee leader, a member of the tribal council, and a lawmaker. As a warrior, he fought in the Cherokee–American wars against American frontiersmen. Later, Major Ridge led the Cherokee in alliances with General Andrew Jackson and the United States in the Creek and Seminole wars of the early 19th century.

Along with Charles R. Hicks and James Vann, Ridge was part of the "Cherokee triumvirate", a group of rising younger chiefs in the early nineteenth-century Cherokee Nation who supported acculturation and other changes in how the people dealt with the United States. All identified as Cherokee; they were of mixed race, though Ridge was nearly full blood, and had extensive personal and professional experience and understanding of the European-American culture surrounding the Cherokee homeland. Ridge became a wealthy planter, and ferryman in Georgia. Like many Cherokee leaders, including John Ross with whom he would come to greatly disagree with on how the Cherokee tribe should respond the United States’ passage of the Indian Removal Act of 1830, Ridge had become a wealthy plantation and slave owner.

Under increasing pressure for removal from the federal government, Ridge and others of the Treaty Party signed the controversial Treaty of New Echota of 1835. They believed removal was inevitable and tried to protect Cherokee rights in the process. It required the Cherokee to cede their remaining lands in the Southeast to the US and to relocate to Indian Territory west of the Mississippi River. Opponents strongly protested to the US government and negotiated a new treaty the following year, but were still forced to accept removal. Blamed for the ceding of communal land and the deaths of the Trail of Tears, Ridge was assassinated in 1839 by members of the Ross faction who believed they were acting in accordance with the Cherokee Blood Law.

== Background ==
=== Early life ===
Ridge was born about 1772 into the Deer clan of his mother, Oganotota (O-go-nuh-to-tua), a Scots-Cherokee woman, in the Cherokee town of Great Hiwassee, along the Hiwassee River (an area later part of Tennessee). His father was believed to be full-blood Cherokee. Ridge's maternal grandfather was a Scots trader who returned to Europe and left a Cherokee wife and daughter behind in America.

Ridge was the third son born, but the first to survive to adulthood. He had two younger brothers, one of whom became known as David Uwatie (father of Stand Watie). From his early years, Ridge was taught patience and self-denial, and to endure fatigue. On reaching the proper age, he was initiated as a warrior. The Cherokee believed that a man's achievements as a warrior were a sign of his spiritual power and part of his leadership.

Until the end of the Cherokee – American wars, the young man was known as Nunnehidihi, meaning "He Who Slays The Enemy In His Path" or "The Pathkiller" (not the same as another chief of the same name). Later Ridge was named Ganundalegi (other spellings include Ca-Nun-Tah-Cla-Kee, Ca-Nun-Ta-Cla-Gee, and Ka-Nun-Tah-Kla-Gee), meaning "The Man Who Walks On The Mountain Top Ridge". White men knew him by the simplified English name, "The Ridge".

=== Marriage and family ===
In 1792, Ridge married Sehoya, also known as Suzannah Catherine Wickett, a mixed-blood Cherokee of the Wild Potato clan. Her name was also spelled Sehoyah; she was the daughter of Kate Parris and Ar-tah-ku-ni-sti-sky ("Wickett"). The couple had several children, including John Ridge. They sent him in 1819 as a young man to Cornwall, Connecticut, to be educated in European-American classical studies at the Foreign Mission School.

After the Cherokee–American wars, the Ridges lived in the Cherokee town of Oothcaloga. (The modern city of Calhoun, Georgia, developed near here.) About 1819, they moved near the Cherokee town of Chatuga (modern-day Rome) at the confluence of the Oostanaula and Etowah rivers, which forms the Coosa River. Ridge acquired 223 acres that fronted on the Oostanaula River, upstream of the confluence. Starting with a log dogtrot house on the property, Ridge expanded the house to a two-story white frame house with extensions on either end. Like European-American planters, Ridge used enslaved African Americans to work the cotton fields on his plantation. Nearby, Ridge's protégé John Ross had established his own home and plantation.

Ridge had no formal education and could neither read nor write. But he was known as a noted orator and dynamic speaker. Ridge appreciated the value of education and believed that the Cherokee must learn to communicate with European Americans and to understand their ways in order to survive as a nation. He sent his son John to a mission boarding school at Springhill.

=== Young warrior ===
In addition to participating in small raids and other actions, Nunnehidihi took part in the attack on Gillespie's Station and in Watts' raids in the winter of 1788–1789; the attack on Buchanan's Station in 1792; the campaign against the settlements of Upper East Tennessee in 1793 (that resulted in the massacre and destruction of Cavett's Station); and the so-called "Battle of Hightower" at Etowah. (Before the 1793 campaigns, he had taken part in a horse-stealing raid against the Holston River settlements, where two European-American pioneers were killed.)

At age 21, Nunnehidihi was chosen as a member of the Cherokee Council. He proved a valuable counselor, and at the second session proposed many useful laws. After the Cherokee–American wars, he changed his name to Ganundalegi, which in English was translated as "He Who Walks On The Ridge".

With the massacre at Cavett's Station, a personal feud developed between The Ridge and Chief Doublehead. The latter had promised to spare the post if the three white men who lived there surrendered. But, after the men agreed to surrender, Doublehead changed his mind and ordered that all the inhabitants be killed, including thirteen women and children. This act disgusted The Ridge, who felt it dishonored the tribe. Frontiersmen pursued Ridge's band, catching them at Coyatee (near the mouth of the Little Tennessee River). They killed several leading Chickamauga Cherokee and wounded others, including Hanging Maw, the chief headman of the Overhill Towns.

In 1807, Doublehead was bribed by white speculators to cede some Cherokee communal land without approval by the Cherokee National Council. The Council determined this to be a capital crime against the nation, and directed Ridge, James Vann, and Alexander Sanders to execute Doublehead. (Vann became too drunk to participate. The other two men used guns, knives, and a tomahawk to kill the old chief on August 9, 1807, at the Hiwassee Garrison in Tennessee).

Shortly before the War of 1812, Shawnee chief Tecumseh and his brother, Tenskawatawa (also called "The Prophet"), came south to recruit other tribes to unite and together prevent the sale of their lands to white immigrants. Tecumseh urged his listeners to reject subservience to the United States, reject the white man's agrarian lifestyle, return to their traditional lifestyles, and take up weapons to defend their lands. Ridge attended as an observer when Tecumseh spoke to the Muscogee (Creek) living nearby. Ridge was said to have confronted Tecumseh after the meeting and warned that he would kill the chief if he tried to spread that message to the Cherokee.

=== Later life ===
Ridge acquired the title "Major" in 1814, during his service leading the Cherokee alongside the United States General Andrew Jackson at the Battle of Horseshoe Bend during the Creek War against the Red Sticks. This was a civil war within the Creek Nation between the Upper Towns and Lower Towns, who differed in their interaction with European Americans versus holding on to tradition. Ridge had joined the campaign as an unofficial militia lieutenant. (Jackson was involved with the larger War of 1812 against Great Britain.) Ridge used Major as his first name for the rest of his life. He also served with Jackson in the First Seminole War in 1818, leading Cherokee warriors on behalf of the US government against the Seminole Indians in Florida. His war achievements added to his stature among the Cherokee.

After the war, Ridge moved his family to the Cherokee town of Head of Coosa (present-day Rome, Georgia). He developed a plantation, owned 30 African-American slaves as laborers, and became a wealthy planter. The plantation consisted of nearly three hundred cleared acres; its main cash crops were corn, tobacco, and cotton. He built his house. Major Ridge also developed and owned a profitable ferry that carried wagons and their teams across the Oostanuaula River. As another business, Ridge founded a trading post in partnership with George Lavender, a white man; the post provided staples and luxury European-American goods such as calico and silk fabrics.

In 1816, Andrew Jackson tried to persuade the Chickasaw and Cherokee nations to sell their lands in the Southeast and move west of the Mississippi River. He was rebuffed by most of the Cherokee chiefs at a council in Mississippi. They told him that he must meet with Chief Pathkiller at a Cherokee council in Turkeytown.

== Cherokee removal ==
Ridge had long opposed U.S. government proposals for the Cherokee to sell their lands and remove to the West. But, Georgia efforts to suppress the Cherokee government and the pressure of rapidly expanding European-American settlements caused him to change his mind. Advised by his son John Ridge, Major Ridge came to believe the best way to preserve the Cherokee Nation was to get good terms from the U.S. government and preserve their rights in Indian Territory.

On December 29, 1835, Ridge made his mark on the Treaty of New Echota, which ceded the remainder of Cherokee tribal land east of the Mississippi River for land in Indian Territory, to be supplemented by the payment of annuities for a period of time, plus support from the government in terms of supplies, tools and food. The tribe was bitterly divided over this decision. Reportedly, Ridge said as he finished, "I have signed my death warrant."

The National Party of Chief John Ross and a majority of the Cherokee National Council rejected the treaty, but it was ratified by the US Senate. The next year Ross negotiated changes with the US government, but essentially Cherokee removal was confirmed.

Ridge, his family, and many other Cherokee emigrated to the West in March 1837. The treaty had been signed in December 1835 and was amended and ratified in March 1836. Georgia illegally put Cherokee lands in a lottery and auctioned them off even before the Cherokee removal date; settlers started arriving and squatting on Cherokee-occupied land. Georgia supported the settlers against the Cherokee. After 1838, the US government forcibly rounded up the remaining Cherokee (along with their slaves) on tribal lands. They were the last of the Five Civilized Tribes of the Southeast to make the journey that became known as the "Trail of Tears", during which nearly 4,000 Cherokee died. (Note: One source claims the Cherokee phrase is Nunna daul Tsuny", which can be translated as, 'The Trail Where They Cried'.)

Accompanied by his wife, daughter, and one of son John's children, Major Ridge traveled by flatboat and steamer to a place in Indian Territory called Honey Creek, near the Arkansas-Missouri Border. The land Ridge had chosen was fifty miles from the territory assigned to the Cherokee. He no longer wished to live among his people. His son John Ridge and Major Ridge's cousin Elias Boudinot followed six months later.

== Execution ==
In the West, the Ross faction blamed Ridge and the other signers of the Treaty of New Echota for the 4,000 deaths along the trail in the Removal, as well as the loss of communal lands, which was held to be a capital crime. In June 1839, Major Ridge and nephew Elias Boudinot, were executed in accordance with the Cherokee Blood Law by members of the Ross faction. Ridge was killed while riding along a road, a group of five men waited with rifles in bushes under trees firing several gunshots at him, with five bullets piercing his head and body leaving the body slumped in saddle.

The Ross faction also tried to kill Ridge's nephew Stand Watie, but he survived. Other Treaty Party members were later killed, starting a wave of violence within the nation.

Daniel Sabin Butrick, a missionary from the American Board of Commissioners for Foreign Missions, who kept a detailed journal as he accompanied Cherokees from the Brainerd Mission on the Trail of Tears, claimed that both Major Ridge and John Ross were Cherokee patriots. On the 3rd of March 1835, nine months before the Treaty of New Echota, Butrick wrote:

“Mr. Ross and Maj. Ridge have both, for a long time, proved to be . . . patriotically attached to the best interests of their country. That they, with others should now be divided in opinion, with regard to the best means of securing that interest, is not to be wondered at.”.

Although it is not possible to trace a contemporary source for the quotation, “Once I saved Ridge at Red Clay, and would have done so again if I had known of the plot,” attributed to Principal Chief John Ross, the fact that Ross’s son, Allen, participated in the plot and was tasked with ensuring that his father was busy precisely so he could not learn of the plot and intervene in the execution plan, does suggest that John Ross would have used his power to stop it.

An alternative perspective posits that both John Ross and Major Ridge were essential to save the Cherokee Nation and the Cherokee people. Major Ridge was necessary because, by signing the Treaty of New Echota, he extricated the Cherokee people from a situation in which they were being murdered, robbed, and their land was being taken without recourse to law (the Georgia land lottery). John Ross, by his steady and tireless work in attempting to block removal, retained the loyalty of the majority of the Cherokee people and prevented them from rising up in violence against the whites and, thus, being slaughtered by Georgians who were far better armed and wanted their land.

Among Ridge's killers was Bird Doublehead. Ridge had killed his father Chief Doublehead under orders by the Cherokee National Council. Another of his killers was James Foreman, Bird's half-brother. In 1842 Stand Watie, Ridge's nephew, killed Foreman. In 1845 opponents killed his younger brother, Thomas Watie. The cycle of retaliatory violence within the Cherokee resulted in the deaths of all the other Watie family males of that generation. Stand Watie survived the violence of the 1840s, when the Cherokee conflict descended into virtual civil war. In the 1850s, Watie was tried in Arkansas for Foreman's murder, but he was acquitted on grounds of self-defense; he was defended by his brother Elias Cornelius Boudinot.

Tribal divisions were exacerbated by the outbreak of the American Civil War. Many Cherokee supported the Confederacy, despite the Southern governments having pushed them out. The Confederacy officials now said they would recognize an independent Indian state if successful in creating an independent nation. Stand Watie served as Principal Chief (1862-1866) of the pro-Confederate Cherokee after Ross and many Union-supporters withdrew to another location. He served as a Confederate general and was the last to surrender to Union troops.

== Burial ==
Ridge and his son John are buried in Polson Cemetery in Delaware County, Oklahoma. After his nephew Stand Watie died later of natural causes, he was buried near them.

== Legacy ==
- Major Ridge's home was bought and preserved by the Junior League of Rome in the 1960s. It was opened to visitors in 1971 as the Chieftains Museum. It has been designated as a National Historic Landmark, renamed to include "Major Ridge Home" in the title. It is listed as one of the sites on the Cherokee Trail of Tears National Historic Trail, administered by the National Park Service.
- Ridge's life and the Trail of Tears are dramatized in Episode 3 of Ric Burns' documentary, We Shall Remain (2009), which recounts Native American history in the United States from the 17th into the 20th century, as part of the American Experience programs on PBS.
- Sarah (Sally) Ridge

== See also ==
- Chieftains Museum (Major Ridge Home), present-day Rome, Georgia
- Timeline of Cherokee removal

== Sources ==
- Arbuckle, Gen Matthew: "Intelligence report and correspondence concerning unrest in Cherokee Nation", Congressional Serial Set 365, 26th Congress, House Document 129 .
- Brown, John P, Old Frontiers: The Story of the Cherokee Indians from Earliest Times to the Date of Their Removal to the West, 1838. Kingsport, TN: Southern Publishers, 1938 (New York: Arno Press Reprint Edition, 1971).
- Dale, Edwards Everett. Cherokee Cavaliers; Forty Years of Cherokee History as Told in the Correspondences of the Ridge-Watie-Boudinot Family, Norman: University of Oklahoma Press, 1939.
- Ehle, John. Trail of Tears: The Rise and Fall of the Cherokee Nation. New York: Doubleday, 1988. ISBN 0-385-23953-X.
- Hicks, Brian. "Toward the Setting Sun": John Ross, the Cherokees, and the Trail of Tears. New York: Atlantic Monthly Press, 2011. ISBN 978-0-8021-1963-6
- Langguth, A. J. Driven West: Andrew Jackson and the Trail of Tears to the Civil War. New York, Simon & Schuster. 2010. ISBN 978-1-4165-4859-1.
- Toney, Carla. Multitribal Indians in Search of No Man’s Land: The American Expansion and the Chickamaugans Between Resistance and Migration" . V & R unipress. 2023. ISBN 978-3-8471-1465-9.
- Wilkins, Thurman. Cherokee Tragedy. (New York: Macmillan Company, 1970).
