= John Ridge =

American Indian politician (c. 1802–1839)

- ᏍᎦᏞᎶᏍᎩ
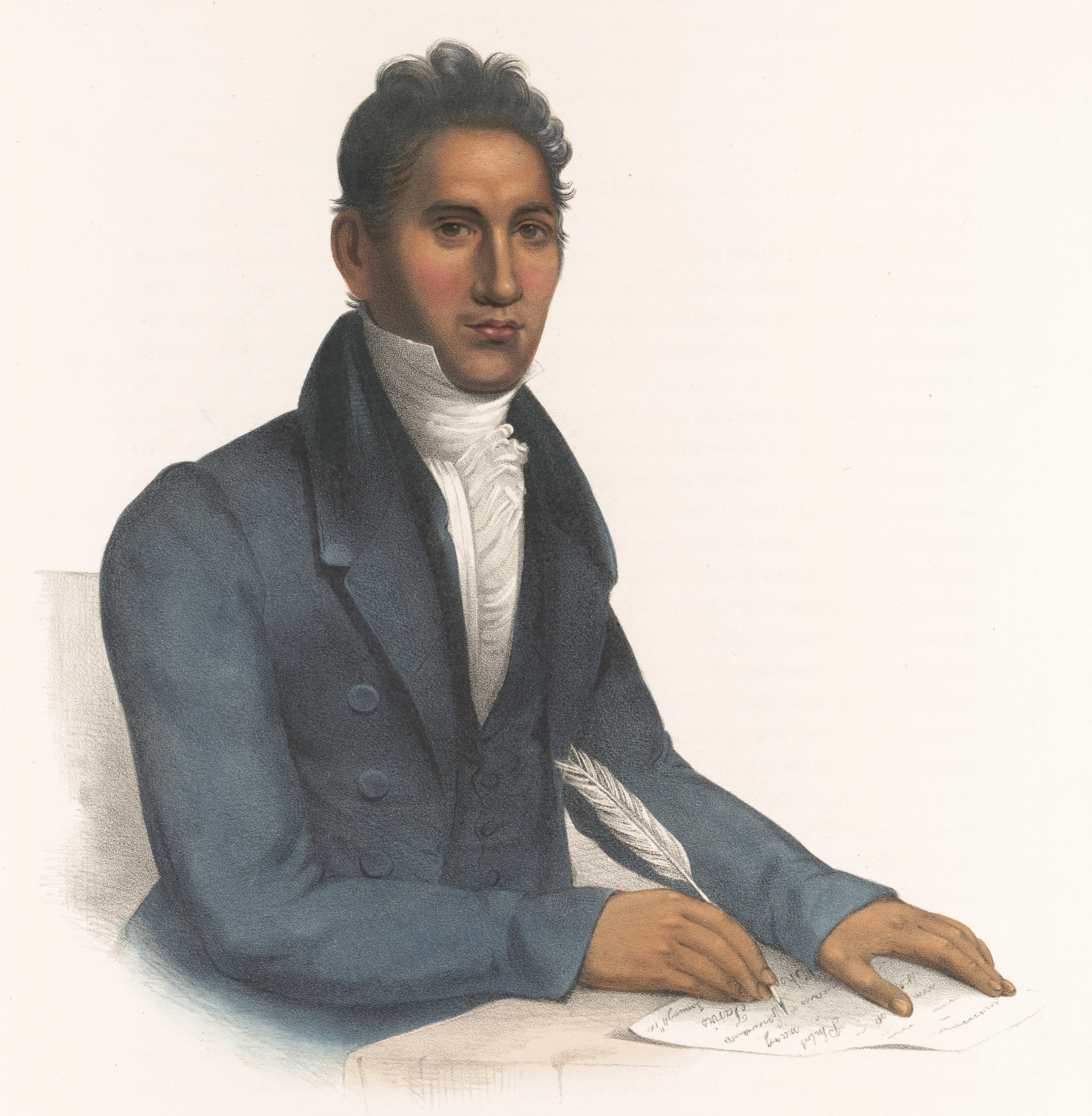
- Ridge painted after his death
- Born: Sgatlelosgi (Yellow Bird) c. 1802; Oothacaloga (Calhoun, Georgia)
- Died: June 22, 1839 (aged 37); Honey Springs Creek, Indian Territory (now Oklahoma)
- Cause of death: assassination
- Citizenship: Cherokee Nation
- Spouse: Sarah Bird Northrup
- Children: John Rollin Ridge
- Parent: Major Ridge

Signature
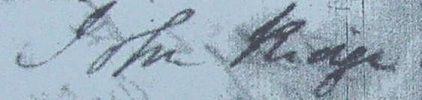

John Ridge, born Skah-tle-loh-skee (Note: Cherokee: ᏍᎦᏞᎶᏍᎩ, romanized: Sgatlelosgi, transl. Yellow Bird Also Cherokee: ᏣᏂ ᎦᏅᏓᏞᎩ, romanized: Tsani Ganvdatlegi) (c. 1802 – 22 June 1839), was from a prominent family of the Cherokee Nation, then located in present-day Georgia. He went to Cornwall, Connecticut, to study at the Foreign Mission School. He met Sarah Bird Northrup, of a New England Yankee family, and they married in 1824. Soon after their return to New Echota in 1825, Ridge was chosen for the Cherokee National Council and became a leader in the tribe.

In the 1830s, Ridge was part of the Treaty Party with his father Major Ridge, and cousins Elias Boudinot and Stand Watie. Believing that Indian Removal was inevitable, they supported making a treaty with the United States government to protect Cherokee rights. The Ridges and Boudinot were signatories to the Treaty of New Echota of 1835, by which they ceded Cherokee lands east of the Mississippi in exchange for lands in Indian Territory. The land cession was opposed by the majority of the tribe and the Principal Chief John Ross, but the treaty was ratified by the US Senate.

In 1839, after removal to Indian Territory, opponents assassinated the Ridges, Boudinot, and other Treaty Party members for their roles in the land cession. This eliminated them as political rivals in the new territory. Stand Watie survived such an attack and later fought on the side of the Confederacy in the U.S. Civil War.

== Early life ==
John Ridge was born to the Cherokee chief Major Ridge and his wife Sehoya around 1802 in their village of Oothacaloga, near present-day Calhoun, Georgia. The Cherokee were a matrilineal tribe, so he was considered to belong to the Wild Potato Clan through his mother, Sehoya (Susannah Catherine Wickett). Ridge was often sick as a child. He studied at the nearby mission school run by the Moravian Brethren at Spring Place, Cherokee Nation (now Georgia). It was founded on land given to them by his father's mentor and fellow former warrior, James Vann.

Ridge's father sent him to the Foreign Mission School in Cornwall, Connecticut, in 1819, where he learned reading and writing in English and other subjects typical of classical middle-class education at the time. The school was originally founded to educate students from non-Christian areas, such as India, Hawaii, and Southeast Asia, to prepare them to return to their peoples as missionaries. At the beginning, many families in the town supported the school and were hospitable to its students. As the top-ranked student, Ridge was asked to write an essay for President James Monroe, to be presented by Jedidiah Morse. His cousin Elias Boudinot also studied at the school.

== Marriage and family ==
While at school in Cornwall, Ridge fell in love with Sarah Bird Northrup, the daughter of the school's steward. After two years, he convinced her parents to allow them to marry, which they did in January 1824. The Cornwall community reacted angrily to the marriage of a Native American man and a white woman. Their hostility decreased Ridge's admiration for European Americans and altered his hopes for future relations between the Cherokee and whites.

=== Death Threats ===
White men had long married into the Cherokee Nation. Missionary Milo Hoyt had married a Cherokee woman without negative consequences. But when John Ridge and his cousin, Elias Boudinot (formerly Buck Watie), fell in love with white women at the Foreign Mission School in Cornwall, Connecticut, racist outrage forced John Ridge to flee for his life on his wedding day. His cousin, Elias, was burnt in effigy by his wife’s brother and told that if he returned to Cornwall half the people of Cornwall would rise up and kill him.

This virulent racism had a profound effect on John Ridge, his cousin, Elias, and, no doubt, Major Ridge. John and Elias found themselves treated as “outcasts” by the people they had tried to emulate; they recognized that Cherokees would never be considered equal to or treated the same as whites..

It was not just John and Elias who were affected. This racism affected others as well. Miles Mackey and James Terrell, Choctaws, were thrown out of the school and had to make their way home to their nation, some one thousand four hundred miles away, on five dollars each. John Sanders, son of Major Ridge’s longtime compatriot, Alexander Sanders, was turned out of the school when he was so ill he could barely sit up. He had to beg for food for several days. When his son John arrived home safely Alexander Sanders enrolled for Arkansas.

=== Broken Trust ===
David Brown’s parents had already made their way to the Arkansas Territory in 1818, after the 1616 winter of starvation for Chickamaugans in Tennessee. In September 1825, David Brown, a former pupil at the Foreign Mission School, wrote from Willstown:

“Your missionaries have told us that the people of New England were our firm friends & that we might at all times lean on them for assistance & we have felt peculiarly greatful [sic] for their kind offices. But you will not be surprised to hear that our confidence is now . . . shaken. . . If our dear friends in New England loved us how could they treat us in this cold & unfeeling manner especially at such a time as this when more than ever we need their prayers & increased exertions?”

David Brown and his half-brother, Will Webber, soon made their way to Arkansas to join their parents.

== Career ==
Ridge was among the first Cherokee men to marry a European-American woman. In the past, marriages between Europeans and Cherokee had most often been between European men, usually fur traders doing business in the territory, and high-status Cherokee women. Both peoples believed these strategic alliances benefited them, as it added to their influence. Generally, the man was living among the Cherokee. Also, in the Cherokee matrilineal kinship culture, the children were considered born to their mother's family and clan, and thus accepted into the Nation as fully Cherokee, with their mother's status. Because white women were outsiders, with no place in the tribe, their descendants would have no status and not be considered Cherokee.

After Ridge returned with Sarah to Georgia, in 1825, the National Council passed a law enabling children of such unions to have full Cherokee citizenship, as if they were of Cherokee descent on their mother's side. By this time, Ridge's cousin Elias Boudinot (the oldest son of David Watie) had announced his engagement, also to a European-American woman from Cornwall, Connecticut. Given the high status of these two young men, the Council's new ruling provided for their future families and protected their children within the Cherokee Nation.

Ridge began to participate in the political affairs of the Nation. He became a leading member of the National Council, along with his cousin Elias Boudinot and his father's protégé, John Ross. Ridge was highly respected by all the tribes across the Southern United States for his abilities and faithfulness to Indian welfare.

=== Creek land negotiations ===
In the 1820s the Creek confederacy was under increasing pressure in their territories in Georgia and Alabama. Leaders had signed an 1821 treaty that ceded land. The second Treaty of Indian Springs ceded most of their remaining land to the United States. Chief William McIntosh of the Lower Creek had led the signatories, but the Creek National Council had not agreed to this cession of communal lands. It passed a death sentence against McIntosh and other signatories, who were killed.

Not ready to give up, in 1825 the Upper Creeks planned to appeal to President John Quincy Adams because of what they considered the illegality of the treaty. Because Chief Opothleyahola, their Speaker, was not fluent in English, the Creek delegation retained two young Cherokee men, recommended by Major Ridge, to assist them in preparing his speech. The Creek knew that Senator Andrew Jackson (D-TN) thought highly of Major Ridge, who had served with him in the Battle of Horseshoe Bend during the Creek Wars. Major Ridge recommended his son John Ridge and David Vann.

Ridge and Vann worked on remarks to be presented by Chief Opothleyahola of the Upper Creeks, who opposed any further land cessions. He stressed that the National Council had not approved the 1825 treaty, making it illegal. He gave the speech to General Edmund P. Gaines, the commander of the U. S. Army in Georgia. That speech was successful in winning General Gaines's support for the Creek position. President Adams was also sympathetic, and this delegation negotiated the Treaty of Washington (1826), which had more favorable terms.

But Georgia continued to press for removal under the 1825 treaty, and the election of Andrew Jackson to the presidency enforced Indian removal. He signed congressional law in 1830. In 1836, most of the Creek left the Southeast for Indian Territory.

=== Political life ===
As clerk of the Cherokee National Council, Ridge participated in tribal delegations to Washington, DC to consult with United States officials. In 1831 they protested Georgia's illegal annexation of that part of the Nation which lay within its territory. (Congress had passed the Indian Removal Act in 1830, but Georgia did not wait.) In 1832, the U.S. Supreme Court ruled in Worcester v. Georgia, that Georgia's unilateral extension of its laws over Cherokee territory was illegal and unconstitutional. It ruled that the Cherokee Nation had sovereign status and appropriately would deal only with the US government. The delegation was dismayed to learn that President Andrew Jackson continued to support the removal of all the Southeast tribes to lands west of the Mississippi River. Ridge reluctantly began to think that removal, which he had previously opposed, was inevitable.

Ridge and Boudinot both became leaders of the "Treaty Party," a group that advocated negotiation of removal under a treaty to protect Cherokee rights. They had begun to believe it was the only way to preserve the Cherokee Nation, as European-American settlers continued to encroach on their lands, leading to armed conflicts. They believed they had to give up the Cherokee land illegally annexed by Georgia. The majority of the Cherokee, who did not support acculturation, sided with the Principal Chief John Ross in opposing removal. Ross hoped to make a settlement with the US allowing the Cherokee to stay in the east. Ridge hoped to persuade the Nation of what he saw as the only way out of its dilemma.

Together with his father and Boudinot, Ridge signed the Treaty of New Echota in 1835 after final negotiations with a delegation in Washington, D.C. They were part of the National Council's delegation, headed by Principal Chief John Ross, who still was trying to negotiate staying in the East. Since the treaty surrendered all Cherokee land east of the Mississippi River, the opposing Ross faction, known as the National Party, regarded the Treaty Party representatives as traitors. Despite the known divisions within the tribe and the lack of signature by Principal Chief Ross, the US Senate ratified the treaty. President Jackson used it to justify the forcible Cherokee removal in 1838, in what is now known as the Trail of Tears.

The Cherokees who wished to remain in the east would have to give up their Cherokee tribal status and become citizens of the states where they resided, and the United States. This provision was widely ignored during removal. The US Army rounded up most Cherokee and their slaves from Georgia to take west. Among the Five Civilized Tribes, the Cherokee held the most enslaved African Americans. There were also some free people of color in the tribe, of mixed Cherokee/African-American descent. Prior to removal, Ridge owned twenty-one slaves and had developed a slave plantation at Running Waters, Georgia, near the Oostanaula River.

== Relocation ==
After the treaty signing, Ridge moved with his family, his father and most of his siblings, his uncle (David Watie), and Watie cousins to what is now Indian Territory. This was three years before the forced removal in 1838 of most of the Cherokee. The Ridges and other families joined the "Old Settlers" of the Cherokee Nation West under Principal Chief John Jolly. Some of them had migrated west in the 1820s from North Carolina or Alabama.

On June 22, 1839, a group of 25 pro-Ross partisans of the "Late Comers" killed Ridge, his father, and Boudinot in revenge for having signed the treaty to cede Cherokee lands. They also attacked Stand Watie, but he survived. Later they killed other Treaty Party members.

== See also ==
- Timeline of Cherokee removal
- Treaty of New Echota

== Sources ==
- Johansen, Bruce Elliot and Barry Pritzker. Encyclopedia of American Indian History, Volume 2. ABC-CLIO, 2007. ISBN 978-1-85109-817-0.
- Langguth, A. J. Driven West: Andrew Jackson and the Trail of Tears to the Civil War. New York, Simon & Schuster. 2010. ISBN 978-1-4165-4859-1.
- Wilkins, Thurman. Cherokee Tragedy: The Ridge family and the Decimation of a People. Norman, OK: U of Oklahoma Press, 1986; ISBN 0-8061-2188-2 (1989 paperback edition).
