= Elias Boudinot (Cherokee) =

American Indian leader (1802–1839)

- ᎦᎴᎩᎾ ᎤᏪᏘ
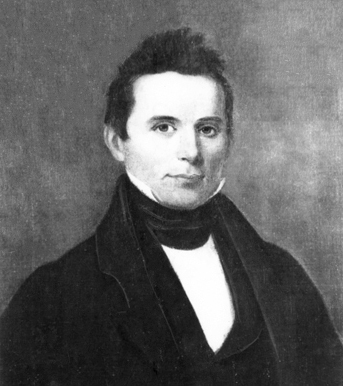
- Muriel Wright Collection, Oklahoma Historical Society
- Born: 1802; Oothcaloga, Cherokee Nation (present-day Calhoun, Georgia), U.S.
- Died: June 22, 1839 (aged 36–37); Park Hill, Cherokee Nation West (present-day Oklahoma), U.S.
- Resting place: Worcester Mission Cemetery, Park Hill, Oklahoma, U.S.
- Other name: Buck Watie
- Spouses: Harriet Boudinot (m. 1823; died 1836) Delight Boudinot (m. 1837)
- Children: E. C. Boudinot (son)
- Relatives: Stand Watie (brother)

Elias Boudinot (Cherokee: ᎦᎴᎩᎾ ᎤᏩᏘ, romanized: Gallegina Uwati; 1802 – June 22, 1839; also known as Buck Watie) was a writer, newspaper editor, and leader of the Cherokee Nation. He was a member of a prominent family, and was born and grew up in Cherokee territory, now part of present-day Georgia. Born to parents of mixed Cherokee and European ancestry and educated at the Foreign Mission School in Connecticut, he became one of several leaders who thought that acculturation was critical to Cherokee survival. He was influential in the period of removal to Indian Territory.

In 1826, Boudinot married Harriet R. Gold, the daughter of a prominent New England family in Cornwall, Connecticut. He met her while a student at the FMS in town. Following his cousin John Ridge's marriage to a local woman there in 1825, Boudinot's marriage was controversial and opposed by many townspeople. But to protect their future children, the Cherokee National Council had passed a law in 1825 enabling the descendants of Cherokee fathers and white mothers to be full citizens of the Cherokee. (Formerly, they had no official place in the matrilineal tribe, as children belong to their mother's clan and people, and the white women were outsiders.) The Boudinots returned to Cherokee homelands (now in Georgia) to live at New Echota. They reared their six children as Cherokee.

Boudinot, with numerous other leading Cherokee, particularly those who had been educated outside the tribe, thought that removal was inevitable in the face of the numbers of United States settlers encroaching on their lands. He and several allies signed the Treaty of New Echota in 1835, seeking to gain the best conditions for their people. Cession of communal lands was adamantly opposed by John Ross, the Principal Chief, and the full-blood members of tribe, who comprised the majority. The following year, the tribe was forced to cede most of its lands in the Southeast, and remove to west of the Mississippi River in Indian Territory in the late 1830s.

After Harriet died in 1836, Boudinot moved with his children to Indian Territory. After Removal, in June 1839 he and three other Treaty Party leaders were assassinated there by members of the Ross faction, known as the National Party. The orphaned Boudinot children were sent to be raised by his parents-in-law in Cornwall, Connecticut, which was believed more safe. They attended school there. After Boudinot's son E. C. was educated, he returned west, settling in Fayetteville, Arkansas. He became an attorney and active in tribal and Democratic Party politics. He represented the Cherokee Nation in the Confederate Congress as a non-voting delegate.

Boudinot appears as a character in Unto These Hills, an outdoor drama that has been performed in Cherokee, NC since 1950.

== Early life and education ==
Gallegina was born in 1802 into a leading Cherokee family in their territory. (It is now present-day Georgia.) He was the eldest son of nine children of Uwati and Susanna Reese, who was of mixed Cherokee and European ancestry. When Uwati converted to Christianity, Boudinot took the name of David Uwatie (later he dropped the "u" from his name.) Gallegina's younger brothers were Degataga, better known as Stand Watie, who served with the Confederate Army during the American Civil War and served as Principal Chief (1862–1866); and Thomas Watie. They were the nephews of Major Ridge and cousins of John Ridge.

Gallegina Watie, the Ridges, John Ross, and Charles R. Hicks and his son Elijah Hicks, came to form the ruling elite of the Cherokee Nation in the early nineteenth century. All were of mixed race and had some European-American education; the tribal chiefs had worked to prepare these young men to deal with the United States and its representatives.

Gallegina's Christian education began in 1808, at the age of 6, when Boudinot studied at the local Moravian missionary school. In 1812, he joined the Spring Place school, in what is now Murray County. Around this time, Cherokee leaders were petitioning the government for aid to educate their children, as they wanted to learn aspects of white civilization.

Elias Cornelius, an agent from the American Board of Commissioners for Foreign Missions (ABCFM), came to the community and served to support local education and recruit older students to study in the North. In 1817, the ABCFM opened the Foreign Mission School in Cornwall, Connecticut for educating promising students from foreign, non-Christian cultures, as well as Native American cultures. In 1818, Cornelius selected Gallegina Watie, John Ridge, and a few others to go to the Foreign Mission School. On the journey there, they were introduced to Virginia statesmen Thomas Jefferson and James Monroe.

In Burlington, New Jersey, the young men met Elias Boudinot, president of the American Bible Society and a former member and president of the Second Continental Congress. He and Watie impressed each other, and Watie asked Boudinot for permission to use his name, which he gave. When enrolled at the Foreign Mission School, Watie started using the name Elias Boudinot, which he kept for the rest of his life.

In 1820, Boudinot officially converted to Christianity, attracted to its message of universal love. His Christian belief informed his later work with the Cherokee Nation. In 1824, Boudinot collaborated with others in translating the New Testament into Cherokee and having it printed in the Cherokee syllabary created by Sequoyah.

== Marriage and family ==
While studying in Connecticut, Boudinot met Harriet Ruggles Gold, the daughter of a prominent local family who supported the Foreign Mission School. Her family often invited Boudinot and other Native American students to their home. After Boudinot returned to Cherokee Nation because of illness, he courted Harriet by letter.

His cousin John Ridge also attended the school and in 1824 married a local young woman. This caused considerable controversy in Cornwall, as many townspeople opposed the marriage. After the Ridges' return to New Echota to live, in 1825 the National Council passed a law providing full Cherokee citizenship to children of a Cherokee father and white mother.

In the Cherokee matrilineal kinship culture, children traditionally belonged to the mother's clan and took their status from her people. The Cherokee had long absorbed the mixed-race children of Cherokee mothers and white fathers (usually fur traders). But, the children of Ridge and Boudinot would have had no place in the Cherokee society without the council's new law, as white women were outsiders and their children would not be considered Cherokee. Historian Theresa Strouth Gaul wrote that the law was inspired by Ridge's marriage and Boudinot's engagement; as the young men were elite Cherokee, it protected the status of their future children.

When Boudinot and Gold first announced their engagement, it was strongly opposed by her family and the Congregational Church. There were also local protests. Gold persisted and finally gained her parents' permission. The couple were married on 28 March 1826 at her home. Local hostility to the marriage, the second between a Cherokee student and a white woman, forced the closing of the Foreign Mission School.

The Boudinots returned to New Echota to live. They had six surviving children: Eleanor Susan; Mary Harriett; William Penn; Sarah Parkhill, Elias Cornelius; and Franklin Brinsmade. Five of the children later married and had families of their own.

Harriet Boudinot died in August 1836, likely of complications from childbirth; she died some months after her seventh child was stillborn.

== Career as editor ==
After his return to New Echota, in 1828 Boudinot was selected by the General Council of the Cherokee as editor for a newspaper, the first to be published by a Native American nation. He worked with a new friend Samuel Worcester, a missionary and printer. Worcester had new type created and cast for the new forms of the Cherokee syllabary. In 1828, the two printed the Cherokee Phoenix in Cherokee and English. While planned as a bi-lingual newspaper, the Phoenix published most of its articles in English; under Boudinot, about 16 percent of the content was published in Cherokee.

The journalist Ann Lackey Landini believes that Boudinot emphasized English in the newspaper because the Cherokee Nation intended it to be a means to explain their people to European Americans and prove they had an admirable civilization. At the same time, the Council intended it to unite the Cherokee through the Southeast. The Phoenix regularly published new laws and other national Cherokee political information in the paper.

Between 1828 and 1832, Boudinot wrote numerous editorials arguing against removal, as proposed by Georgia and supported by President Andrew Jackson. After Congress passed the Indian Removal Act of 1830, federal pressure on the Cherokee increased. Jackson supported removal of the Cherokee and other Southeastern peoples from their eastern homelands to Indian Territory west of the Mississippi in order to make land available for European-American development. Over a roughly four-year period, Boudinot's editorials emphasized that Georgia's disregard of the Constitution and past federal treaties with the Cherokee would not only hurt Cherokee progress in acculturating, but threatened the fabric of the Union. Boudinot's articles recounted the elements of Cherokee assimilation (conversion to Christianity, an increasingly Western-educated population, and a turn toward lives as herdsmen and farmers, etc.) He criticized the "easy" way in which treaty language was distorted by Indian Removal advocates for their own purposes.

In 1832, while on a speaking tour of the North to raise funds for the Phoenix, Boudinot learned that, in Worcester v. Georgia, the US Supreme Court had sustained the Cherokee rights to political and territorial sovereignty within Georgia's borders. He soon learned that President Jackson still supported Indian Removal. In this context, Boudinot began advocating for his people to secure the best possible terms with the US by making a binding treaty of removal, as he believed it was inevitable. His changed position was widely opposed by the Cherokee.

The National Council and John Ross, the Principal Chief, opposed removal, as did the majority of the people. Former allies in the Cherokee government turned against Boudinot and other "treaty advocates," who included John Ridge and Major Ridge. Opponents attacked the men's loyalty and prevented their speaking in councils. Ross denounced Boudinot's "toleration of diversified views in the Cherokee Phoenix and forbade Boudinot from discussing pro-removal arguments in the paper. In protest, Boudinot resigned in the spring of 1832. Ross' brother-in-law, Elijah Hicks, replaced Boudinot as editor.

In 1959, he was inducted into the Georgia Newspaper Hall of Fame in recognition of his newspaper work.

== Literary works ==
=== Cherokee Phoenix ===
The first newspaper published by a Native American tribe gave a "voice to the American insiders" who had been forced to become "outsiders". The premier edition of the newspaper was called the Tsalagi Tsu-le-hi-sa-nu-hi; it was printed on 21 February 1828. The Cherokee Phoenix office regularly received correspondence from about 100 other newspapers, published far and wide, because it was so respected throughout the United States and Europe. In 1829, the second edition of the Cherokee Phoenix was named the Cherokee Phoenix and Indians’ Advocate, indicating Boudinot's ambition to influence people outside the tribe. Boudinot regularly wrote editorials related to Indian Removal.

=== "An Address to the Whites" (1826) ===
Boudinot delivered this speech in the First Presbyterian Church in Philadelphia on May 26, 1826. He described the similarities between the Cherokee and the whites, and ways in which the Cherokee were adopting aspects of white culture. Boudinot was fundraising for a Cherokee national academy and printing equipment for the newspaper, support for "civilizing" the Cherokee. Following the speech, he published his speech in a pamphlet by the same title. "An Address to the Whites" was well received and "proved to be remarkably effective at fund-raising".

== Influence on Indian Removal ==
The Indian removal policy was a result of the discovery of gold in Cherokee territory, the growth of the cotton industry, and the relentless European-American desire for land in the Southeast. European Americans resented Cherokee control of their lands, and conflicts increasingly arose. The Indian Removal Act of 1830 called for all Indian peoples living east of the Mississippi River to be removed and sent west beyond the river. While the majority of the Cherokee led by Chief John Ross opposed the act, Boudinot began to believe that Indian Removal was inevitable. He thought the best outcome was for the Cherokee to secure their rights through treaty, before they were moved against their will. Boudinot used all of his writing and oratory skills to influence Indian Removal policy, but many within the nation opposed his viewpoint. He criticized the popular principal chief John Ross, who opposed his ideas. Ross had ordered Boudinot to stop publishing his views favoring removal in the newspaper.

In 1832, Boudinot resigned as editor of the Cherokee Phoenix, giving his reasons his inadequate salary, personal health problems, and the inability of the Cherokee Nation to provide sufficient supplies to run a national newspaper. However, in a letter to John Ross, he indicated that he could no longer serve because he was unable to print what he believed to be true about the dangers to the people from continuing to oppose removal. Ross and the council accepted the resignation and appointed Elijah Hicks to run the newspaper. Although Hicks was a good businessman he had no newspaper experience. The Cherokee Phoenix soon declined and ceased publication on 31 May 1834.

== Removal to Indian Territory ==
Boudinot and Treaty Party leaders signed the Treaty of New Echota (1835) in New Echota, Cherokee Nation (now Calhoun, Georgia) ceding all Cherokee land east of the Mississippi River. Although this was opposed by the majority of the delegation and lacked the signature of the Principal Chief John Ross, the US Senate ratified the treaty. Afterward, faced with open enmity among the Cherokee, many of the signatories and their families migrated to Indian Territory, where they located with the "Old Settlers", who had gone there in the 1820s.

During 1838 and 1839, the US Army enforced the Removal Act and evicted the Cherokee and their slaves from their homes in the Southeast. They forced most of them west into Indian Territory (in eastern present-day Oklahoma). The Cherokee referred to their journey as the Trail of Tears.

After his wife's death in 1836, Boudinot needed to relocate both himself and the children. He sent their son, Cornelius, to live with a family in Huntsville, Alabama, where he could be treated for his condition by a doctor. Another son traveled west with the Ridge family. The rest of the children were enrolled in school at Brainerd, where they could stay when Elias left the territory. Elias himself first went north to visit Harriet's parents. After that, he joined a group that included John Ridge and traveled to the Western Cherokee Nation, it was established by "Old Settlers" in the northeast quarter of what is today Oklahoma. Two months later he wrote to Harriet's parents that he had married Delight Sargent, a New England woman who had been a teacher at New Echota. Impoverished, he received $500 from the American Board of Commissioners for Foreign Missions (thanks to persuasive argument from Samuel Worcester) to build a modest house a quarter mile from the Worcesters in Park Hill. Reunited with his longtime friend, Boudinot returned to his vocation as a translator of the Gospel.

The "Old Settlers" and John Ross' supporters failed to agree on unification following the Nation's removal to Indian Territory. Some Ross supporters met secretly to plan assassinations of Treaty Party leaders over the hardships of the Removal and to eliminate them as political rivals in a way which would intimidate the Old Settlers into submission. On June 22, 1839, a group of unknown Cherokee assassinated Boudinot outside his home. They killed his cousin and uncle, John and Major Ridge, the same day. His brother Stand Watie was attacked but survived.

Though Ross denied any connection to the killings, Stand Watie blamed the Principal Chief. After these murders followers of Watie and Ross engaged for years in violent conflict and retaliation. Watie killed a man whom he had seen attack his uncle Major Ridge; he was acquitted on the grounds of self-defense. At his trial, he was represented by his nephew, E. C. Boudinot. He had become a lawyer in Arkansas after having been raised by his mother's family and educated in the East following his father's assassination.

The violence lasted into 1846, when the US negotiated a tenuous peace treaty. The deep bitterness contributed to tribal divisions during the American Civil War. The post-removal factionalism and violence compounded the misfortune of the Cherokee Nation.

During the Civil War, the Nation split into two factions. Stand Watie and his supporters, the majority of the Nation, sided with the Confederacy (he served as an officer in their army, along with other Cherokee.) Ross and his supporters sided with the Union. Many Union people had to leave Indian Territory during the war for their own safety. They returned after the Union victory, and Ross was the only chief recognized by the US.

== See also ==
- Timeline of Cherokee removal
- Treaty of New Echota
