= Elias Boudinot (disambiguation) =

Elias Boudinot (1740–1821) was an American revolutionary and President of the Continental Congress.

Elias Boudinot may also refer to:

- Elias Boudinot (Cherokee) (1802–1839), Cherokee Indian journalist and publisher
- Elias Cornelius Boudinot (1835–1890), Confederate Colonel and Congressman from Arkansas
