= Cherokee Cases =

The Cherokee Cases were a trio of cases before the Marshall Court:

- Tassels' Case: a December 1830 writ of error in the criminal case of George Tassels, mooted by Tassels' execution before the Court could hear the case
- Cherokee Nation v. Georgia, 30 U.S. (5 Pet.) 1 (1831)
- Worcester v. Georgia, 31 U.S. (6 Pet.) 515 (1832)

== See also ==
- Aboriginal title in the Marshall Court
- Cherokee tobacco case
