= Shawna Baker =

Native American lawyer

Justice of the Cherokee Nation Supreme Court
- In office August 2020 – February 1, 2025
- Appointed by: Chuck Hoskin Jr.
- Preceded by: Lynn Burris
- Succeeded by: Amy Page

Personal details
- Citizenship: American; Cherokee Nation

Shawna S. Baker, a Native American lawyer, citizen of the Cherokee Nation, is the third woman and the first out 2SLGBTQ+ person to be appointed a justice on the Cherokee Nation Supreme Court. Baker is also on the Chuck Hoskin Jr., Principal Chief of the Cherokee Nation, Domestic Violence Task Force which was launched in 2021, and on the Cherokee Nation Health Services’ Ending the HIV Epidemic Committee. She is an advisor to Indian Health Services and on the Ending the HIV Epidemic Committee in Northwest Portland, Oregon, USA. Other roles include being a distinguished alumna in residence at the University of Tulsa College of Law, managing attorney of Family Legacy and Wealth Counsel, PLLC, and a trustee of Oklahomans for Equality in Tulsa, Oklahoma.

== Education and career ==
Baker was raised in Westville, Oklahoma, near the border with Arkansas within the Cherokee Nation Reservation. She grew up during the decade (1985-1995) that Wilma Mankiller served as the first woman Principal Chief of the Cherokee Nation. Baker was the first person in her family to go to college, choosing a biology major at the nearest university to her home, and earned a bachelor's degree from John Brown University in Siloam Springs, Arkansas. In her first year there Baker watched a film called The Ghosts of Mississippi about the pursuit of justice by the family of civil rights activist Medgar Evers and the trial and conviction of his murderer, Byron De La Beckwith. The film was a catalyst for Baker to change her studies from science to law. Gaining a scholarship to attend the University of Tulsa, she majored in law, but also continued with science courses. In 2002, Baker received both a master's degree in biological science and a law degree with highest honor in their joint degree program. After graduating, she worked for three years at Doerner, Saunders, Daniel & Anderson, an Oklahoma firm specializing in family law. While there she was awarded the Martin Fellows Smith Award. In 2007, she received a master's in law from Columbia University. She was recognized as a Harlan Fiske Stone Scholar and a member of Columbia's Journal of Gender and Law.

Baker then took a position as an assistant professor of law at Florida Coastal School of Law in Jacksonville, Florida. In 2009, she was recognized as the Outstanding Faculty Member of the year by the James Weldon Johnson Chapter of the National Black Law Students Association. After two years at Florida Coastal, Baker accepted a five-year contract to assist with the creation of a private charitable foundation. While working full-time, in the fall of 2013, she enrolled at New York University's School of Law. She flew to and from New York each week for four semesters and graduated with a Master of Laws (LL.M) in taxation in 2015. Later that year she founded her own estate planning practice, Family Legacy & Wealth Counsel, PLLC. Baker has published in the field of estate planning as it relates to same sex couples.

After completing her education, Baker returned to Oklahoma and became involved with the government of the Cherokee Nation. Her first nomination to the bench of the Cherokee Supreme Court was unsuccessful. She was asked by the then recently elected Principal Chief Chuck Hoskin Jr., to serve on the Cherokee Nation Gaming Commission. In 2020, after some months of work as a gaming commissioner, Baker was nominated again to the court and was sworn in as a Cherokee Nation Supreme Court justice. She was the third woman to be on the bench after Stacy L. Leeds, who was appointed in 2002, and the late Angela Barker-Jones, the second woman in the role. The Supreme Court is the highest court in the Cherokee Nation government. It interprets the tribe's constitution and statutes in all civil and criminal proceedings. On February 22, 2021, Baker's first written opinion was published, Effect of Cherokee Nation v. Nash & Vann v. Zinke, CNSC-2017-07. It granted full citizen rights to Cherokee Freedmen, descendants of African American people previously enslaved by Cherokee Indians, thus ending the discrimination against those on the reservation and at large who were not Cherokee by blood. Graham Lee Brewer, Indigenous affairs editor at High Country News, and a member of the Cherokee Nation said, '....as someone who reads a lot of court documents for work, I would argue it was one of the most beautifully written ones I've ever read.'

In June 2024, Baker was a mentor cyclist in the 40th 'Remember the Removal' bike ride commemorating the Trail of Tears, the forced displacement of Cherokees, in 1830 -1850, from their homelands westwards. On February 1, 2025, she resigned from the Cherokee Nation Supreme Court to work for Cherokee Nation Businesses.

== Other honors ==
In 2020, John Brown University recognized Baker as its Career Achievement Award recipient.

In 2021, the Oklahoma Bar Association recognized Baker’s contributions to the bench by awarding her the Ada Lois Sipuel Fisher Diversity Award.

In 2021, The University of Tulsa College of Law awarded Baker the Outstanding Senior Alumna Award.

2022 NYU Alumni Changemaker of the Year (LAW '15).

== Selected works by Baker ==
"Essential Estate Planning for the Constitutionally Unrecognized Families in Oklahoma: Same Sex Couples" in Tulsa Law Review (2004) Vol 40 Issue 3 pp 479–525. Linda J. Lacey and D. Marianne Blair, both law professors at the University of Tulsa, stated that the article evaluated "the profound discriminatory effects" that the ban on same-sex marriage in the state had on couple's rights. Lacey and Blair said Baker and her co-author Camille Quinn, compared the rights of a committed same-sex couple with a married couple when one partner becomes incapacitated or dies. According to Lacey and Blair, the article was "an invaluable primer" for the complexities involved in estate planning for same-sex couples to ensure that they received any of the benefits and protections which were automatically afforded to traditional married couples. They also said that the article provided an overview of the estate and health laws of Oklahoma and covered in detail the documents "that are relevant to representation of all clients, regardless of their family structure" in the state.

"Where Conscience Meets Desire: Refusal of Health Care Providers to Honor Health Care Proxies for Sexual Minorities" in Women's Rights Law Reporter (2009-2010) Vol 31 Issue 1 pp 1–41. According to legal scholars, Nikki Burrill and Valita Fredland, the article evaluated the difficulties same-sex partners experienced in being granted the authority to make health care decisions in the event of incapacity of the other partner. Baker recommended that LGBT couples prepare advance healthcare directives to allow the partners to serve as each other's proxy. She also pointed out that some states also had requirements for "separate statutes for living wills and durable power of attorney for health care", which might also need to be executed to protect the ability of one partner to act as a surrogate for the other.

Final Order in the Supreme Court of the Cherokee Nation, SC-2017-07 In 2007, the Cherokee Nation amended its constitution to insert the words "by blood" to define who could be enrolled in the tribe. Those words effectively stripped of citizenship thousands of Cherokee citizens who descended from former slaves of Cherokee owners, who had been removed with them on the Trail of Tears, and who had been granted tribal citizenship under the terms of a treaty signed by Cherokee leaders and the US government in 1866. In 2017, a US District Court ruled that under the terms of the 1866 treaty Freemen were entitled to full tribal citizenship, which includes the right to obtain services such as health care, housing, and scholarships from the tribe and hold office on the tribal council or run for chief. Baker's ruling recognized that the Freedmen's rights were inherent and extended to them "as a birthright springing from their ancestors' oppression and displacement as people of color". Baker continued "The 'by blood' language found within the Cherokee Nation Constitution, and any laws which flow from that language, is illegal, obsolete, and repugnant to the ideal of liberty". Her ruling invalidated the phrase "by blood" from the Cherokee Constitution and other legislation or policies.

== See also ==
- List of LGBT jurists in the United States
- List of Native American jurists
- Native American women in politics
