= Elias Cornelius =

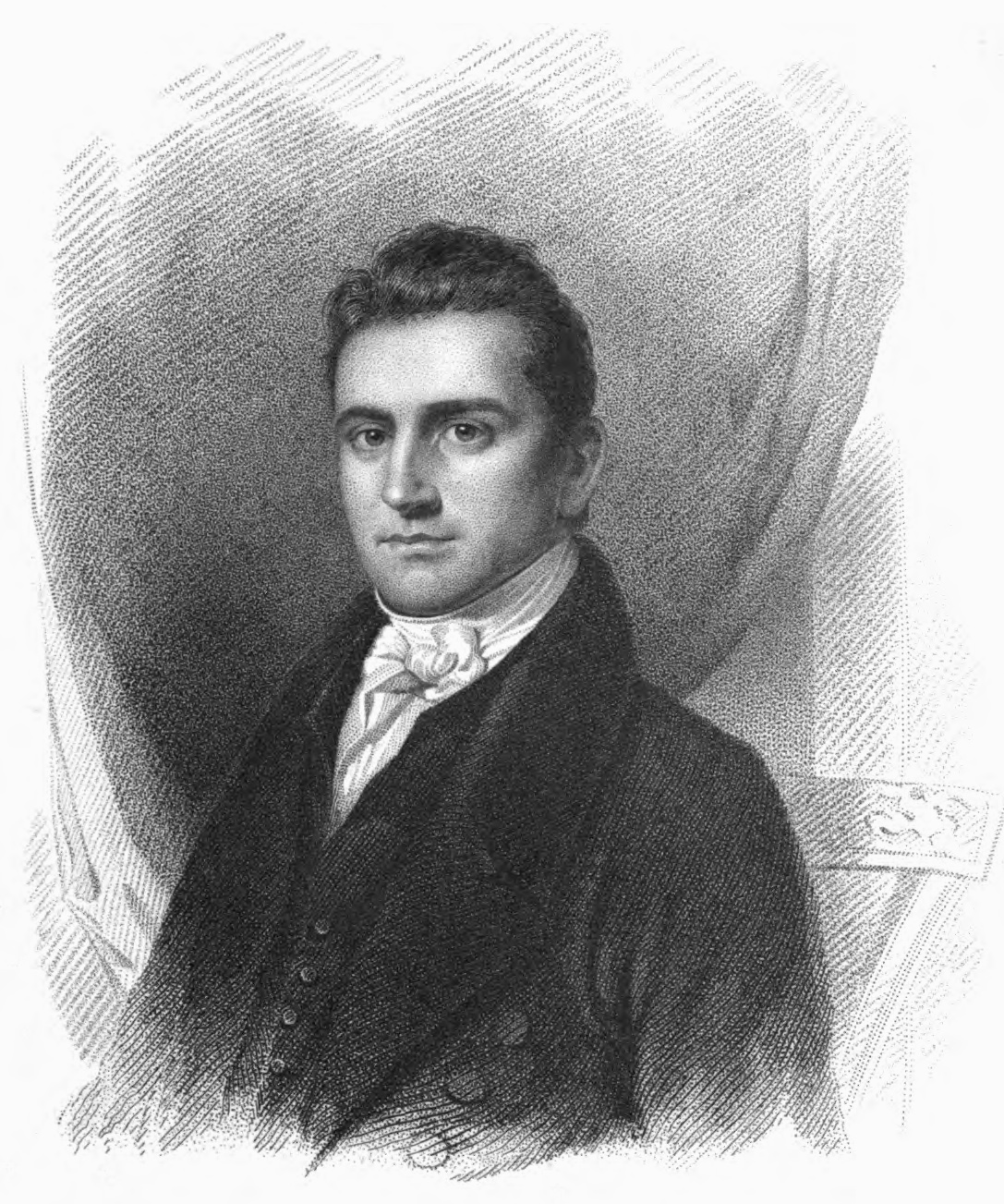
- Born: July 30, 1794; Somers, Westchester County, New York, U.S.
- Died: February 12, 1832 (aged 37)
- Education: Yale College

Elias Cornelius (1794–1832) was an American Christian missionary and ordained minister.

== Life ==
Elias Cornelius' father was also named Elias Cornelius (1758–1823), and his mother was Rachel Stocker. His father had joined the American Revolutionary War as a surgeon after some rudimentary training, but was taken prisoner on 22 August 1777. Cornelius met Ethan Allen in prison, but escaped on 16 January 1778, and rejoined the Continental Army.

Elias Cornelius was born 30 July 1794 in Somers, Westchester County, New York. At the age of sixteen, he began his college career at Yale College. After his undergraduate years, Cornelius continued to study theology at the Yale Divinity School under Timothy Dwight IV. He was licensed to preach on 4 June 1816 by the South Association of Congregational ministers, and appointed agent of the American Board of Commissioners for Foreign Missions (ABCFM).

As ABCFM agent Cornelius traveled to many cities and towns in the northeastern states including Rhode Island, Connecticut, and Maryland, preaching sermons and raising money. The majority of the money raised was to support the conversion of the Cherokee, Choctaw, Chickasaw, and Creek Indian tribes to Christianity. It was also to be used to establish schools within these nations. Cornelius continued to preach and fundraise as he traveled south where he finally ended in Northwest Georgia, near Cartersville in 1817. He spent 18 months there and it was at this location that he encountered the Cherokee tribe who led him to the Etowah Indian Mounds. Cornelius wrote in his journal about his visit and the journal became the first published account of a white person visiting the mounds. Neither Cornelius nor the group of Cherokee who led him to the site knew the relevance or purpose of the mounds at that time. It was later discovered that the mounds were used as burial sites as well as residential areas and temples.

In September 1818, Cornelius married Mary Hooker, daughter of Asabel Hooker (minister of Goshen, Connecticut), descendants of Thomas Hooker (1586–1647). Their children were:

1. Elias Cornelius III, born 13 August 1819, married Lydia Francis Gray, and died 7 December 1857.
2. Mary Hooker Cornelius, born 3 July 1821.
3. Thomas Hooker Cornelius, born 17 March 1823 and died 18 November 1853 in San Francisco.
4. Edward Hooker Cornelius, born 10 September 1825 and died 29 April 1864 in Milwaukee, Wisconsin.
5. Sarah Edwards Cornelius, born 14 February 1830, married George B. Little in 1850, and had two daughters.
6. Jeremiah Evarts Cornelius, born 25 December 1831, married Sarah Fenner Storrs (daughter of William L. Storrs) in 1862, had a son and a daughter, and died 4 March 1896.

On 22 July 1819, Cornelius became associate pastor of the Tabernacle Church in Salem, Massachusetts. After the death of Jeremiah Evarts, Cornelius was named secretary of the ABCFM in October 1831, but became ill. He died on 12 February 1832.

Elias Boudinot, one of the students Cornelius introduced to the Foreign Mission School became a later Cherokee National leader and named his son Elias Cornelius Boudinot in honour of Cornelius. Elias Cornelius Boudinot grew up to be a colonel in the Confederate States Army
