= Stick Ross =

Member of the Cherokee Nation Legislature from the Tahlequah District
- In office 1893–1894

Personal details
- Born: Joseph Ross; 1854 or 1855 Cherokee Nation, Indian Territory, U.S.
- Died: 1930 (aged 75-77)
- Resting place: Ross Cemetery, Tahlequah, Oklahoma, U. S.
- Citizenship: Cherokee Nation (after 1866); American (after 1901)

Joseph "Stick" Ross was a Cherokee Freedman who served in the legislature of the Cherokee Nation from 1893 to 1894. He was born into slavery and owned by John Ross until his emancipation in 1866.

== Biography ==
Joseph "Stick" Ross was born into slavery in either 1854 or 1855 within Indian Territory. He and his parents, Hector and Sallie Ross, were owned by the Principal Chief of the Cherokee Nation, John Ross. He gained the name "Stick" because he was tall and thin. While enslaved by John Ross, he worked at his mill. He was emancipated in 1863 by the Cherokee Emancipation Proclamation and granted citizenship in the Cherokee Nation by the 1866 treaty with the United States after the American Civil War. He later worked as a mortar carrier during the construction of the Cherokee National Capitol and was a member of Tahlequah's first business club. From 1893 to 1894 he served in the Cherokee legislature representing the Tahlequah district. He frequently supported applications for Cherokee citizenship in the 1890s. According to his great-grandson, he spoke Cherokee, Seminole, and sign language and also served as sheriff.

In 1901, he successfully applied to have himself and his family listed on the Dawes Rolls as Cherokee Freedmen. His allotment was at Stick Ross Mountain near Tahlequah. He died in 1930. He was buried in an unmarked grave at the Ross Cemetery in Tahlequah, which is named after him.

== Legacy ==
He donated the land for Ross Cemetery in Tahlequah, Oklahoma, where he is buried, to be used a cemetery for Cherokee Freedmen. Stick Ross Mountain and Stick Ross Mountain Road are near Tahlequah are also named after him.
