= List of United States Supreme Court cases, volume 78 =

Supreme Court of the United States
- Interactive map of Supreme Court of the United States
- 38°53′26″N 77°00′16″W
- Established: March 4, 1789; 236 years ago
- Location: Washington, D.C.
- Coordinates: 38°53′26″N 77°00′16″W
- Composition method: Presidential nomination with Senate confirmation
- Authorised by: Constitution of the United States, Art. III, § 1
- Judge term length: life tenure, subject to impeachment and removal
- Number of positions: 9 (by statute)
- Website: supremecourt.gov

This is a list of cases reported in volume 78 (11 Wall.) of United States Reports, decided by the Supreme Court of the United States in 1871, along with cases from 1867 and 1869.

== Nominative reports ==
In 1874, the U.S. government created the United States Reports, and retroactively numbered older privately published case reports as part of the new series. As a result, cases appearing in volumes 1–90 of U.S. Reports have dual citation forms; one for the volume number of U.S. Reports, and one for the volume number of the reports named for the relevant reporter of decisions (these are called "nominative reports").

=== John William Wallace ===
Starting with the 66th volume of U.S. Reports, the Reporter of Decisions of the Supreme Court of the United States was John William Wallace. Wallace was Reporter of Decisions from 1863 to 1874, covering volumes 68 through 90 of United States Reports which correspond to volumes 1 through 23 of his Wallace's Reports. As such, the dual form of citation to, for example, Ludlow v. Ramsey is 78 U.S. (11 Wall.) 581 (1871).

Wallace's Reports were the final nominative reports for the US Supreme Court; starting with volume 91, cases were identified simply as "(volume #) U.S. (page #) (year)".

== Justices of the Supreme Court at the time of 78 U.S. (11 Wall.) ==
The Supreme Court is established by Article III, Section 1 of the Constitution of the United States, which says: "The judicial Power of the United States, shall be vested in one supreme Court . . .". The size of the Court is not specified; the Constitution leaves it to Congress to set the number of justices. Under the Judiciary Act of 1789 Congress originally fixed the number of justices at six (one chief justice and five associate justices). Since 1789 Congress has varied the size of the Court from six to seven, nine, ten, and back to nine justices (always including one chief justice).

To prevent President Andrew Johnson from appointing any justices, a hostile Congress passed the Judicial Circuits Act of 1866, eliminating three of the 10 seats from the Supreme Court as they became vacant, and so potentially reducing the size of the court to seven justices. The vacancy caused by the death of Justice John Catron in 1865 had not been filled, so after Justice James Moore Wayne died in July 1867 there were eight justices left on the court at the start of the term when the cases in 78 U.S. (11 Wall.) were decided; however Justice Robert Cooper Grier resigned at the end of January 1870, temporarily reducing the Court to seven justices. Newly confirmed justices William Strong and Joseph P. Bradley joined the Court in March 1870, in the final weeks of the session. This brought the Court back to nine justices, the number set by the Judiciary Act of 1869.

=== Fluctuations in Supreme Court membership, 1864-1870 ===
Justice	Departure from the Court	Arrival on the Court	Number of active justices after his arrival or departure
Chase	-	15 December 1864	10 (the then-current statutory number)
Catron	30 May 1865	-	9 (one less than the then-current statutory number of 10)
Wayne	5 July 1867	-	8 (one more than the then-current statutory number of 7)
Grier	31 January 1870	-	7 (two less than the then-current statutory number of 9)
Strong	-	14 March 1870	8 (one less than the then-current statutory number of 9)
Bradley	-	23 March 1870	9 (the then-current statutory number)

Portrait	Justice	Office	Home State	Succeeded	Date confirmed by the Senate (Vote)	Tenure on Supreme Court
	Salmon P. Chase	Chief Justice	Ohio	Roger B. Taney	December 6, 1864 (Acclamation)	December 15, 1864 – May 7, 1873 (Died)
	Samuel Nelson	Associate Justice	New York	Smith Thompson	February 14, 1845 (Acclamation)	February 27, 1845 – November 28, 1872 (Retired)
	Nathan Clifford	Associate Justice	Maine	Benjamin Robbins Curtis	January 12, 1858 (26–23)	January 21, 1858 – July 25, 1881 (Died)
	Noah Haynes Swayne	Associate Justice	Ohio	John McLean	January 24, 1862 (38–1)	January 27, 1862 – January 24, 1881 (Retired)
	Samuel Freeman Miller	Associate Justice	Iowa	Peter Vivian Daniel	July 16, 1862 (Acclamation)	July 21, 1862 – October 13, 1890 (Died)
	David Davis	Associate Justice	Illinois	John Archibald Campbell	December 8, 1862 (Acclamation)	December 10, 1862 – March 4, 1877 (Resigned)
	Stephen Johnson Field	Associate Justice	California	newly created seat	March 10, 1863 (Acclamation)	May 10, 1863 – December 1, 1897 (Retired)
	William Strong	Associate Justice	Pennsylvania	Robert Cooper Grier	February 18, 1870 (No vote recorded)	March 14, 1870 – December 14, 1880 (Retired)
	Joseph P. Bradley	Associate Justice	New Jersey	newly created seat	March 21, 1870 (46–9)	March 23, 1870 – January 22, 1892 (Died)

== Notable Case in 78 U.S. (11 Wall.) ==
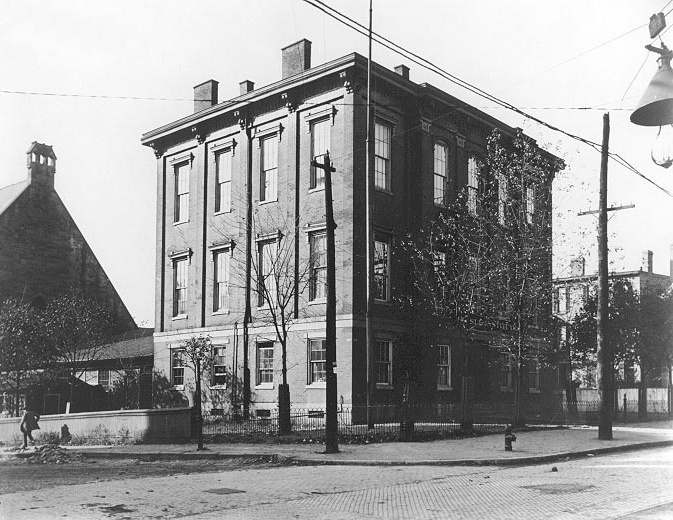
West Virginia's first capitol building, Wheeling, 1863–1870.

=== Virginia v. West Virginia ===
In Virginia v. West Virginia, 78 U.S. (11 Wall.) 39 (1871), the Supreme Court held that when a governor has discretion in the conduct of an election, the legislature is bound by his actions and cannot undo the results based on fraud. The Court implicitly affirmed that the breakaway Virginia counties had received the necessary consent of both Virginia and the United States Congress to become a separate U.S. state, and explicitly held that the counties of Berkeley and Jefferson were part of the new State of West Virginia. Although the Court never directly ruled on the constitutionality of West Virginia's creation, decisions such as those in Virginia v. West Virginia led to a de facto recognition of the state which is now unassailable.

== Citation style ==
Under the Judiciary Act of 1789 the federal court structure at the time comprised District Courts, which had general trial jurisdiction; Circuit Courts, which had mixed trial and appellate (from the US District Courts) jurisdiction; and the United States Supreme Court, which had appellate jurisdiction over the federal District and Circuit courts—and for certain issues over state courts. The Supreme Court also had limited original jurisdiction (i.e., in which cases could be filed directly with the Supreme Court without first having been heard by a lower federal or state court). There were one or more federal District Courts and/or Circuit Courts in each state, territory, or other geographical region.

Bluebook citation style is used for case names, citations, and jurisdictions.

- "C.C.D." = United States Circuit Court for the District of . . .
  - e.g.,"C.C.D.N.J." = United States Circuit Court for the District of New Jersey
- "D." = United States District Court for the District of . . .
  - e.g.,"D. Mass." = United States District Court for the District of Massachusetts
- "E." = Eastern; "M." = Middle; "N." = Northern; "S." = Southern; "W." = Western
  - e.g.,"C.C.S.D.N.Y." = United States Circuit Court for the Southern District of New York
  - e.g.,"M.D. Ala." = United States District Court for the Middle District of Alabama
- "Ct. Cl." = United States Court of Claims
- The abbreviation of a state's name alone indicates the highest appellate court in that state's judiciary at the time.
  - e.g.,"Pa." = Supreme Court of Pennsylvania
  - e.g.,"Me." = Supreme Judicial Court of Maine

== List of cases in 78 U.S. (11 Wall.) ==
Case Name	Page & year	Opinion of the Court	Concurring opinion(s)	Dissenting opinion(s)	Lower Court	Disposition
New England M.M. Insurance Company v. Dunham	1 (1871)	Bradley	none	none	C.C.D. Mass.	certification
Parmelee v. Lawrence	36 (1871)	Nelson	none	none	Ill.	dismissed
Virginia v. West Virginia	39 (1871)	Miller	none	Davis	original	dismissed
Morgan v. Thornhill	65 (1871)	Clifford	none	none	C.C.D. La.	dismissed
The Protector	82 (1871)	Nelson	none	Swayne	C.C.S.D. Ala.	dismissed
United States v. Tynen	88 (1871)	Field	none	none	D. Cal.	certification
City of New Albany v. Burke	96 (1871)	Strong	none	none	C.C.D. Ind.	reversed
Dows v. City of Chicago	108 (1871)	Field	none	none	C.C.N.D. Ill.	affirmed
Collector v. Day	113 (1871)	Nelson	none	Bradley	C.C.D. Mass.	affirmed
Western Transportation Company v. Downer	129 (1871)	Field	none	none	C.C.N.D. Ill.	reversed
Amy v. Des Moines County	136 (1871)	Swayne	none	none	C.C.D. Iowa	reversed
Smith v. Sac County	139 (1871)	Miller	none	Clifford	C.C.D. Iowa	affirmed
The Sapphire	164 (1871)	Bradley	none	none	C.C.D. Cal.	reversed
Susquehanna et al. Company v. Blatchford	172 (1871)	Field	none	none	C.C.W.D. Pa.	reversed
United States v. O'Keefe	178 (1871)	Davis	none	none	Ct. Cl.	affirmed
Leon v. Galceran	185 (1871)	Clifford	none	none	La.	affirmed
Generes v. Campbell	193 (1871)	Swayne	none	none	C.C.D. La.	affirmed
Case v. Terrell	199 (1871)	Miller	none	none	C.C.D. La.	reversed
Phoenix Insurance Company v. King's County	204 (1871)	Bradley	none	none	N.Y. Sup. Ct.	dismissed
Germania et al. Company v. Francis	210 (1871)	Davis	none	none	S.D. Miss.	reversed
May v. Le Claire	217 (1871)	Swayne	none	none	C.C.D. Iowa	reversed
The Fannie	238 (1871)	Strong	none	none	C.C.D. Md.	affirmed
Levy v. Stewart	244 (1871)	Clifford	none	none	C.C.D. La.	affirmed
Garnett v. United States	256 (1871)	Swayne	none	none	Sup. Ct. D.C.	reversed
McVeigh v. United States	259 (1871)	Swayne	none	none	C.C.D. Va.	reversed
Miller v. United States	268 (1871)	Strong	none	Field; Davis	C.C.E.D. Mich.	affirmed
Tyler v. Defrees	331 (1871)	Miller	none	Field	Sup. Ct. D.C.	affirmed
The Distilled Spirits	356 (1871)	Bradley	none	none	C.C.D. Mass.	affirmed
First National Bank v. Lanier	369 (1871)	Davis	none	none	C.C.D. Ind.	affirmed
Dewing v. Sears	379 (1871)	Strong	none	none	Mass. Super. Ct.	reversed
Rankin v. State	380 (1871)	Bradley	none	none	Tenn.	dismissed
Edmondson v. Bloomshire	382 (1871)	Clifford	none	none	C.C.S.D. Ohio	affirmed
Bank of Leavenworth v. Hunt's Assignee	391 (1871)	Field	none	none	C.C.D. Kan.	affirmed
Missouri v. Kentucky	395 (1871)	Davis	none	none	original	dismissed
The Montello	411 (1871)	Field	none	none	C.C.D. Wis.	reversed
Moncure v. Zunts	416 (1871)	Miller	none	none	C.C.D. La.	reversed
City of St. Louis v. Wiggins F. Company	423 (1871)	Swayne	none	none	C.C.D. Mo.	affirmed
United States v. Howell	432 (1871)	Miller	none	none	C.C.D. Cal.	certification
Home Insurance Company v. Weide	438 (1871)	Davis	none	none	C.C.D. Minn.	reversed
Meader v. Norton	442 (1871)	Clifford	none	none	C.C.D. Cal.	affirmed
Galveston, Houston and Henderson Railroad v. Cowdrey	459 (1871)	Bradley	none	none	C.C.E.D. Tex.	affirmed
Forsyth v. Woods	484 (1871)	Strong	none	none	C.C.D. Mo.	affirmed
Eureka Company v. Bailey Company	488 (1871)	Miller	none	none	C.C.D. Mass.	affirmed
Stewart v. Kahn	493 (1871)	Swayne	none	none	La.	reversed
United States v. Wiley	508 (1871)	Strong	none	none	C.C.D. Va.	reversed
Seymour v. Osborne	516 (1871)	Clifford	none	none	C.C.N.D.N.Y.	reversed
Prior art must enable a person having ordinary skill in the art to make and use the invention.
Halliday v. Hamilton	560 (1871)	Davis	none	none	C.C.S.D. Ill.	affirmed
Steinbach v. Stewart	566 (1871)	Strong	none	none	C.C.D. Cal.	affirmed
Ludlow v. Ramsey	581 (1871)	Bradley	none	none	C.C.E.D. Tenn.	reversed
Reed v. United States	591 (1871)	Clifford	none	none	Ct. Cl.	reversed
Dunphy v. Kleinsmith	610 (1871)	Bradley	none	none	Sup. Ct. Terr. Mont.	reversed
The Cherokee Tobacco	616 (1871)	Swayne	none	Bradley	W.D. Ark.	affirmed
Bank v. New Orleans and Carrollton Railroad Company	624 (1871)	Strong	none	none	C.C.D. La.	affirmed
United States v. Lynde	632 (1871)	Bradley	none	Clifford	D. La.	affirmed
United States v. Wright	648 (1871)	Davis	none	none	C.C.M.D. Tenn.	reversed
Mann v. Rock Island Bank	650 (1871)	Miller	none	none	C.C.D. Wis.	affirmed
Henderson's Tobacco	652 (1871)	Strong	none	none	C.C.D. Iowa	reversed
Cook v. Burnley I	659 (1867)	Nelson	none	none	E.D. Tex.	affirmed
Cook v. Burnley II	672 (1871)	Clifford	none	none	E.D. Tex.	dismissed
Whiteley v. Kirby	678 (1869)	Nelson	none	none	C.C.S.D. Ohio	affirmed
Legal Tender Cases	682 (1871)	per curiam	none	none	not indicated	Act upheld

== See also ==
certificate of division
