= Oak Cemetery =

Historic cemetery in Arkansas, United States

- U.S. National Register of Historic Places
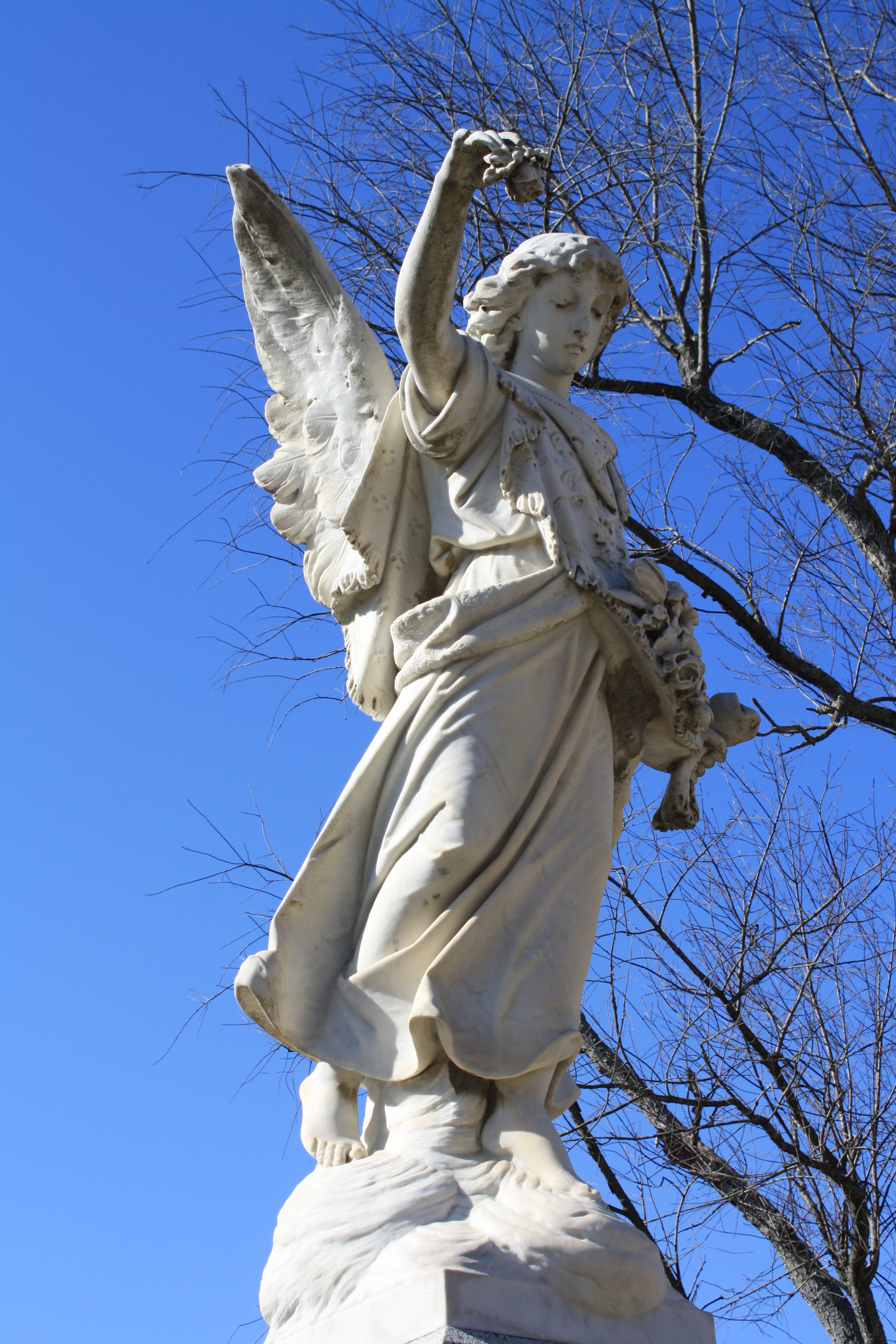

- Location within Arkansas Location within the United States
- Location: SE of jct. of Greenwood and Dodson Aves., Fort Smith, Arkansas
- Coordinates: 35.3691°N 94.4023°W
- Area: 35 acres (14 ha)
- Built: 1853
- NRHP reference No.: 95000665
- Added to NRHP: June 2, 1995

Oak Cemetery is a historic cemetery at Greenwood and Dodson Avenues in Fort Smith, Arkansas. Established in 1853, it is the city's oldest and largest cemetery, and the burial site of many of its most prominent citizens. The cemetery covers 35 acres (14 ha) and is estimated to have more than 11,000 burials. Noted burials include Fort Smith founder John Rogers.

The cemetery was listed on the National Register of Historic Places in 1995.

== See also ==
- National Register of Historic Places listings in Sebastian County, Arkansas
