= James Fenelon =

James Fenelon may refer to:

- James Fenelon (politician) (1846–1915), member of the Wisconsin State Assembly
- James V. Fenelon, American sociologist, poet, author, and academic
