= Experiment in International Living =

Voluntary association

The Experiment in International Living
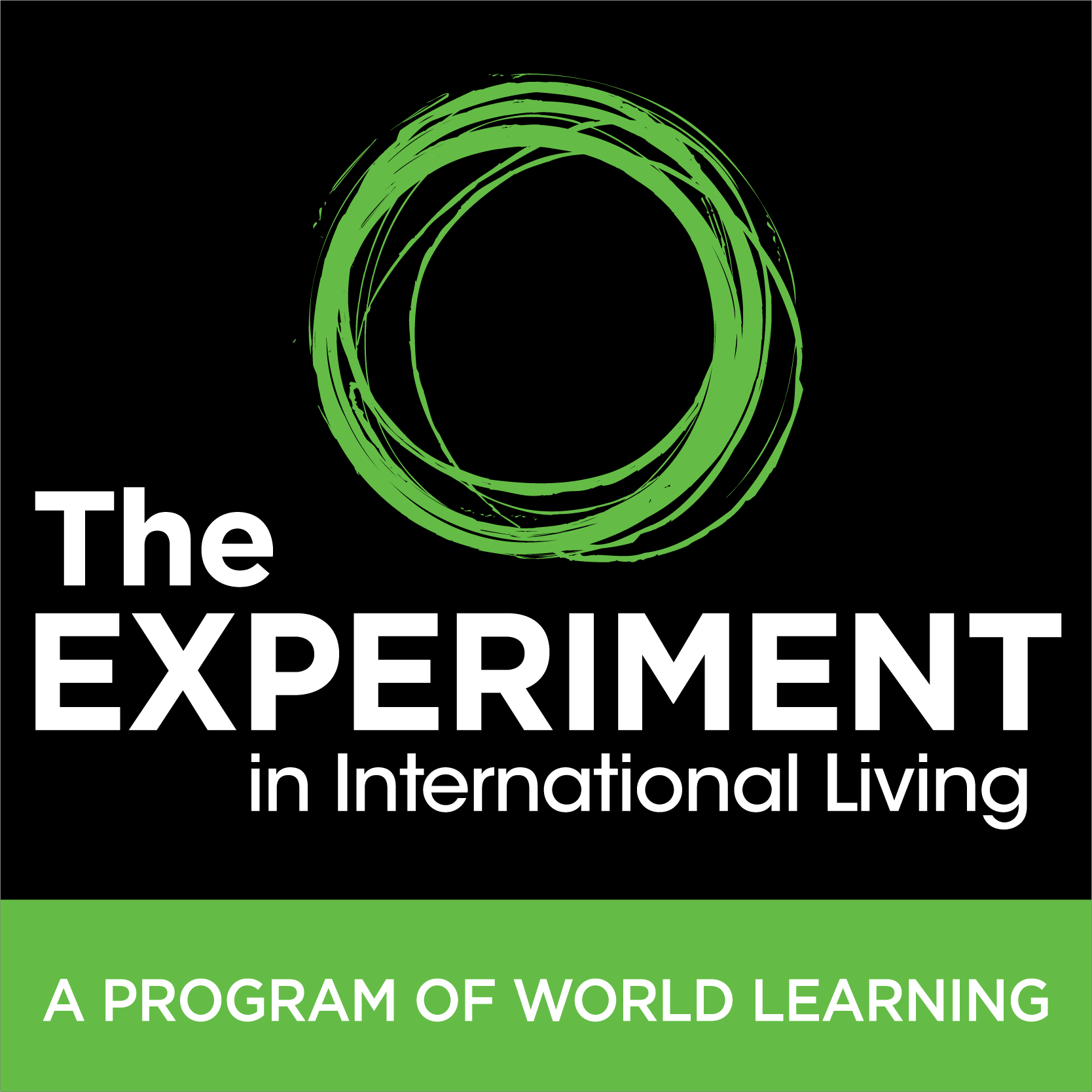
- Type: High school summer abroad programs
- Established: 1932
- Executive Director: Aaron Morehouse
- Students: 40,000+ alumni over 86 years
- Location: Brattleboro, VT, USA
- Website: www.experiment.org

The Experiment in International Living, or The Experiment, is a worldwide program offering homestays, language, arts, community service, ecological adventure, culinary, and regional and cultural exploration programs of international cross-cultural education for high school students. It is administered by World Learning, a non-profit, international development and education organization based in Brattleboro, Vermont, in the United States.

== History ==
The Experiment in International Living began in 1932. In that year, former Syracuse University personnel director Donald Watt, dissatisfied with the state of international education, created a revolutionary new cultural immersion program called The Experiment in International Living. Under his guidance, a group of 23 students sailed for eight days across the Atlantic with the mission of fostering peace through understanding, communication, and cooperation by living in close quarters with French and German boys and hiking in the Swiss Alps.

The following year, Watt conceived of the idea of having the American students live with French and German families. "Experimenters" were placed in the homes of host families to enhance the intercultural and/or language study aspects of each program. This never-before-tried concept came to be known as the homestay and allowed students to develop friendships and understand different cultures in a personal, meaningful way.

Experiment assisted after World War II when they lead teaching voyages on a series of decommissioned warships with the members of the Student Council on Travel.

Since the introduction of homestays, organizations including the People to People Student Ambassador Program and School Year Abroad have adopted this cultural immersion technique to facilitate understanding.

In the early 1960s, Sargent Shriver, founding director of the Peace Corps and an Experiment alumnus, tapped The Experiment to train the first class of Peace Corps volunteers.

Since its founding, The Experiment has grown in size, scope, destination, and concept. After 85 years and more than 70,000 participants, The Experiment remains a leader in the field of international cross-cultural education for high school students. The Experiment is the flagship program of World Learning, a thriving global nonprofit organization with education, sustainable, development, and exchange programs in more than 150 countries. World Learning is part of the World Learning Inc. family, which also includes the School for International Training (SIT), a global institution, offering accredited undergraduate study abroad programs through SIT Study Abroad, and globally focused master’s degrees through SIT Graduate Institute.

== Mission ==
The Experiment in International Living's mission remains "to foster peace through understanding, communication, and cooperation" and "to share experiences, languages, and customs with those from different traditions, with the goals of broadening horizons, gaining lifelong friends, and advancing peace."

== Current programs ==
The Experiment in International Living has been offering immersive experiential learning programs abroad since 1932. Today, The Experiment offers 17 high school summer abroad programs in 15 countries.

Participants are challenged to explore the host country through hands-on experiences in local communities and through the lens of a specific theme.

=== Locations ===
In 2022, the Experiment offered 17 programs in 15 countries including:

AFRICA & MIDDLE EAST

- Ghana: Contemporary Art & Culture (college credit and internship)
- Jordan: Arabic Language & The Middle East (college credit)

ASIA

- Japan: Japanese Language & Culture
- Japan: Anime & Manga
- South Korea: K-Culture & Peacebuilding

EUROPE

- France: French Language & Culture
- France: Cultural Discovery
- Germany: International Relations & The E.U.
- Italy: Culinary Training & Culture
- The Netherlands: LGBTQ+ Rights & Advocacy (college credit)
- Portugal: Environmental Studies & Climate Change (college credit)
- Serbia & Croatia: Peace & Conflict Studies (college credit)
- Spain: Cultural Discovery
- Spain: Spanish Language & Culture
- Switzerland: Global Health & Humanitarian Action (college credit)

LATIN AMERICA

- Ecuador: The Galápagos Islands & The Andes
- Peru: Environmental Studies & Indigenous Peoples (college credit and internship)

=== Applications ===
As part of the application process, students must submit a letter (in either English, Spanish, or French, depending on the location of the program) to a prospective host family. The letter and a profile filled out by the applicant are used by the local homestay representative to match students with a family. Students apply online.

=== Scholarships ===
In 2018, The Experiment and its partner organizations awarded nearly $2 million in scholarships. This support comes from The Experiment’s network of alumni, individual donors, foundations, and corporations. Most of The Experiment’s scholarships are need-based, and range from $250 to $2,200.

== Notable alumni ==
- Stephen Breyer, Justice, Supreme Court of the United States
- Arianna Huffington, Editor-in-Chief, Huffington Post
- Sargent Shriver, Founder, US Peace Corps
- Julie Taymor, Director of theater, opera, and film
- Grace Elizabeth Lotowycz, American botanist and pilot
- Rosalind Fox Solomon, Artist

== See also ==
- World Learning
- School for International Training
