= As Long as Grass Grows =

2019 book by Dina Gilio-Whitaker

- Front cover
- Author: Dina Gilio-Whitaker
- Subject: Environmental justice and Native Americans in the United States
- Publisher: Beacon Press
- Publication date: April 2, 2019
- Pages: 224
- ISBN: 978-080707378-0

As Long as Grass Grows: The Indigenous Fight for Environmental Justice, from Colonization to Standing Rock is a 2019 non-fiction book by Dina Gilio-Whitaker. The author details the history of Native Americans in the United States since European colonization, including criticisms of the modern conservation movement as exclusionary to indigenous concepts of land and environmental stewardship, and coverage of the 2010s Dakota Access Pipeline protests at Standing Rock.

== Background ==
Dina Gilio-Whitaker (Colville Confederated Tribes direct descendant) was lecturing in American Indian Studies at California State University San Marcos at the time of the book's publication. It was Gilio-Whitaker's second book, after her co-authorship of "All the Real Indians Died Off" and 20 Other Myths About Native Americans (2016) with Roxanne Dunbar-Ortiz. As Long as Grass Grows was published by Beacon Press on April 2, 2019.

== Synopsis ==
The book gives a history of Native Americans in the United States from European colonization to the modern day, with the topic of the environment in focus. The European invasion that began in 1492 led to the deaths of 99% of Native Americans from diseases brought to the land, wars and starvation, including through forced displacements like the Trail of Tears. Many American settlers believed in "manifest destiny"—that they had a moral duty to colonize across the Americas—and they enforced concepts of land ownership and usage that were at odds with Native American culture.

Gilio-Whitaker contends that in the modern era, the American legal system prevents indigenous Americans from self-organization and governance in areas like environmental stewardship, economics and social justice. She criticizes the views of Henry David Thoreau and John Muir on Native Americans, and that the conservation movement which arose from their ideology saw the wilderness as a place that indigenous people needed to be excluded from; meanwhile, toxic waste was disposed of in locations where it would harm communities of color. By establishing national parks in places like Yosemite, the native stewards of the area were excluded from it.

The book covers concepts of gender among Native American groups, some of whom had matrilineal power structures and different conceptions of gender identity and the role of family to settlers. Early feminists would be inspired by the Iroquois confederacy's Clan Mother roles. However, the imposition of Christianity erased many of these values.

Gilio-Whitaker explores the Dakota Access Pipeline protests at Standing Rock in 2016 and 2017, where an oil pipeline was approved to pass through sacred ground. Construction was completed, despite the protests and anticipated threats to the region's water and environment. Using the United Nations's Declaration on the Rights of Indigenous Peoples and state and local approaches in California, Gilio-Whitaker argues that federal laws like the American Indian Religious Freedom Act should be extended to protect sites of cultural significance to Native Americans, such as Panhe for the Acjachemen people. She advocates decolonization and community organizing.

== Reception ==
The New York Public Library and BuzzFeed News both suggested the book as recommended reading for the 2020 United States elections on the subject of climate change. The Michigan Daily named it as one of 10 defining books of 2020: Trina Pal wrote for the publication that it is "a must-read for anyone hoping to understand the history and rights of Indigenous tribes" and a "wonderful and necessary start" to learning about environmental justice and how to participate in it. Pal saw it as complementing existing literature by indigenous authors like Braiding Sweetgrass (2013). Alexandra Tempus of The Progressive praised the book as "accessible", saying that Gilio-Whitaker "roots her arguments in indigenous wisdom" and writing that "there is no more urgent prescription for America" than the suggestions she outlines at the end of the book.
