= World Learning =

International nonprofit organization

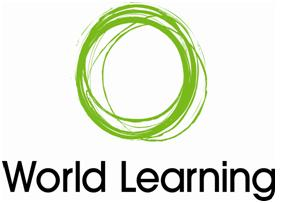
- Founded: June 1932
- Founder: Donald B. Watt
- Type: Nonprofit organization
- Tax ID no.: 03-0179592
- Coordinates: 42.888067°N 72.56474°W
- Region served: 70 countries
- Key people: Carol Jenkins (CEO) & (President)
- Revenue: $150 million
- Endowment: $46.5 million
- Employees: 1,100 worldwide
- Website: worldlearning.org
- Formerly called: The Experiment in International Living

World Learning is a 501(c)(3) international nonprofit organization that focuses on international development, education, and exchange programs. Based in Brattleboro, Vermont, World Learning "unlocks the potential of people to address critical global issues" through its core program areas: The Experiment in International Living, the School for International Training (including the International Honors Program), and International Development and Exchange Programs.

== History ==
The Experiment in International Living (EIL) began in 1932. The Experiment was selected by the original architects of the Peace Corps, because the professionals at EIL were known to have a strong system for teaching the nuances of cultural immersion preparedness. The Experiment assisted after World War II when they led teaching voyages on a series of decommissioned warships with the members of the Student Council on Travel.

The School for International Training (SIT) was established in 1964. SIT filled a need of returned Peace Corps volunteers by offering a graduate degree in International Development. The Vermont campus originally consisted of a small collection of dorms around a Carriage House on a scenic farm on the north end of Brattleboro. These early Peace Corps volunteers took lessons in foreign languages with materials and teachers from the language training from their service, and The School for International Training began to expand its offerings. By 1968, the small but increasing number of returned Peace Corps volunteers were requesting a degree in Teaching English as a Second Language, a new speciality. In 1969, two graduate programs were developed, International Career Training (ICT), and Masters in Teaching Languages (MAT) (French, Spanish and ESL).

In the late 1970s, the 1980s, and 1990s there was an undergraduate program called the World Issues Program (WIP). It was a two-year program for transfer juniors and seniors. During the early years, a group of students published a book entitled "Process: About Learning and Caring" which speaks about the difficulties and rewards of transformational education.

Inspired by a speech by United Nations leader U Thant, the program provided classes in Peace and Conflict Studies, Alternative Energy Sources, Population Studies, International Economics and Environmental Studies. After the first year spent on campus, students had year-long internships in different sites around the world. The final semester consisted of research into one of these areas on a topic of the student's choice, and presentations of research results. The program was usually completed through submission of a Bachelor's Thesis or combination of projects. After 22 graduating classes, nearby Marlboro College adopted this program and offered it on their campus.

The International Visitor Leadership Project has brought community activists, legislators and regional leaders to campus to study the means of bringing peace to such war-torn places as Rwanda, Ireland, Bosnia or Israel/Palestine.

== Programs ==
The Experiment in International Living is the longest functioning exchange program and offers students international homestays that can provide learning while abroad.

SIT Graduate Institute is the accredited master's degree program of World Learning, offering Master of Arts degrees in Conflict Transformation; International Education; Sustainable Development; Intercultural Service, Leadership and Management; and Teaching English to Speakers of Other Languages.

SIT Study Abroad offers undergraduate programs overseas in more than 60 countries. The program has begun the journeys of many notable recipients of fellowships and prestigious education and platforms. The International Honors Program is a new member of the SIT Study Abroad portfolio, leading programs in studying and traveling with multiple destinations.

International Professional, Academic, and Cultural Exchanges works to bridge differences through citizen diplomacy. The program is engaged on a daily basis in promoting global understanding "one handshake at a time," the World Learning Visitor Exchange Program (formerly Delphi International) facilitates citizen diplomacy through exchange programs for adults and young leaders.IPAE

As a part of an extensive international NGO network, World Learning also has International Development Programs which focus on capacity building in International Development in 20 countries.World Learning - IDEP

Reporting of US Federal educational institution statistics continues under the name, School for International Training, but some data (though apparently not for enrollment) may pertain to both the SIT Graduate Institute and SIT Study Abroad.

World Learning currently operates about 200 programs in 70 countries.
