= Richard Ryscavage =

- Born: March 25, 1945
- Died: April 26, 2019 (aged 74)
- Education: Assumption College; Tufts University; Boston College; School for International Training
- Occupations: Director, Center for Faith and Public Life at Fairfield University
- Notable work: Authority on migration issues and social justice
- Board member of: World Youth Alliance; The International Institute of Connecticut

Richard Ryscavage, S.J. (March 25, 1945 – April 26, 2019) was the director of the Center for Faith and Public Life and a professor of sociology and international studies at Fairfield University in Fairfield, Connecticut, and developed courses at Georgetown University. He was an internationally recognized expert on migration issues.

== Positions held ==
Ryscavage served as executive director of the United States Conference of Catholic Bishops Office of Migration and Refugee Services in Washington, D.C., where he oversaw annual federal grants of more than $40 million. He was also president of Catholic Charities Immigration Legal Services, set up by the bishops to help new immigrants, and president of the Catholic Legal Immigration Network (CLINIC).

He served as national director of Jesuit Refugee Service USA, a nongovernmental organization operating in fifty countries. He organized the first program to provide religious coordinators for immigration detention facilities of the United States Department of Homeland Security. He was the first Arrupe Tutor at the Refugee Studies Centre of Oxford University in England.

In 2006 Ryscavage was appointed official adviser to the delegation of the Holy See to the 61st United Nations General Assembly, and participated as one of the Vatican representatives in the “High Level Dialogue on Migration” convened by the UN Secretary General.

He has been a member of the Federal government's Interagency Task Force on Unaccompanied Children, which includes members of the U.S. State Dept., DHS, Justice, and HHS, and special advisor to President Obama.

He has served as church spokesman for the major media and as distinguished panelist.

Ryscavage received his bachelor's degree and an honorary doctorate from Assumption College. He earned his master's degrees in law and diplomacy from the Fletcher School of Law and Diplomacy at Tufts University, in political philosophy from Boston College, in divinity from the Weston School of Theology (also at Boston College), and in international administration from the School for International Training.
