= Grace Lotowycz =

American botanist

Grace Elizabeth “Betty” Lotowycz
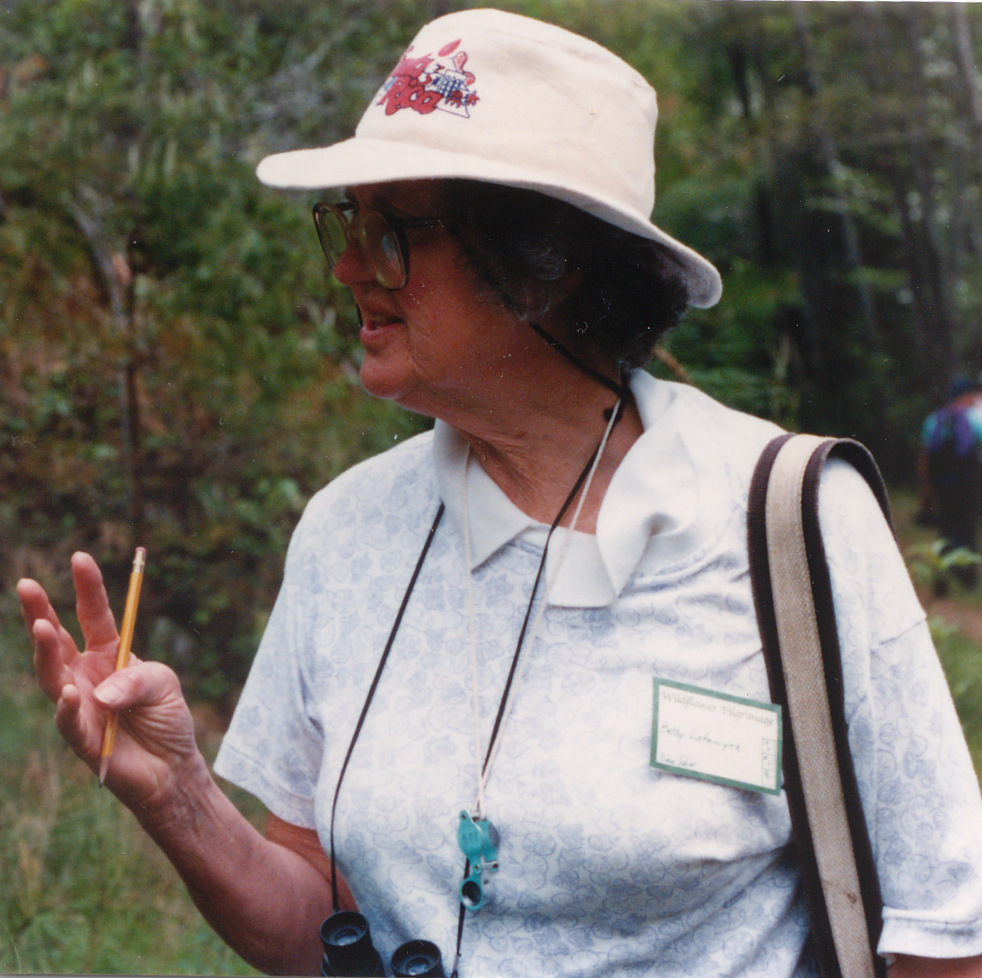
- Born: May 11, 1916; New York City, New York
- Died: April 8, 2016 (aged 99); Louisville, Colorado
- Education: Vassar College
- Spouse: Wladimir "Bill" Lotowycz
- Scientific career
- Fields: Botany

Grace E. "Betty" Lotowycz (born Grace Elizabeth Ashwell, May 11, 1916 – April 8, 2016) was an American botanist, a pioneering woman alpinist, and Women Airforce Service Pilot in World War II.

== Early life ==
She was born in New York City, the first child of publisher Thomas Walker Ashwell and Helen Mariah Buffum Ashwell; in 1919 the family moved to New Canaan, Connecticut, living across the street from Maxwell Perkins. As a child she suffered from several serious illnesses, at one point having to re-learn to walk.

Lotowycz studied botany at Vassar College, where she began mountaineering in the Shawangunks and later the Canadian Rockies. She graduated in 1938 and then joined the Experiment in International Living, a student-exchange program which enabled her to climb in the Swiss Alps and scale the Matterhorn. She worked briefly as a curatorial assistant at the Brooklyn Botanical Garden.

== Flier ==
Lotowycz was a pilot in the WASPs in World War II, one of only 1,047. She was a member of Class 44-W-7 at Avenger Field in Sweetwater, Texas; and was subsequently assigned to the ferrying service out of Minter Field near Bakersfield, California. Lotowycz and the other WASP filers were finally recognized as WWII military veterans in 1977, and received the Congressional Gold Medal in 2009.

After the WASPs were decommissioned in December 1944, she applied to several commercial airlines using her nickname "Gerry Ashwell", but was always told "no". She married Navy pilot Vlademir "Bill" Lotowycz, and they moved to Damascus after the war while he worked for Pan American World Airways.

== Botanist ==
In 1962, she began working at the Planting Fields Arboretum State Historic Park where she established and curated the herbarium of preserved plants that currently numbers about 10,000 specimens. She retired in 1984 after 22 years.

Lotowycz was a founding member of the Long Island Botanical Society and lifetime member of the Torrey Botanical Society.

At the age of 88, Lotowycz co-authored a book, Illustrated Field Guide to Shrubs and Woody Vines of Long Island, with Barbara Conolly.
