= School for International Training =

Higher learning institution in Vermont, US

Coordinates: 42.888067°N 72.56474°W

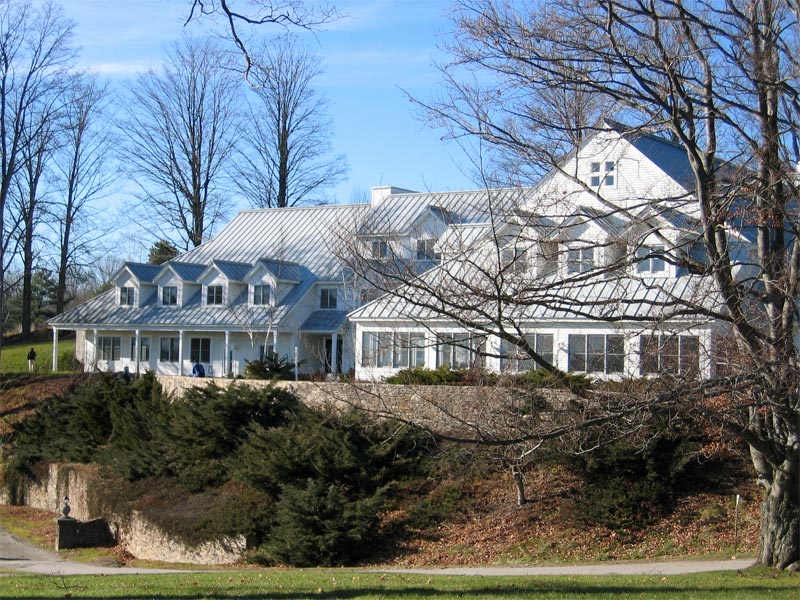
- Type: Private, Graduate, Study abroad
- Established: 1964; 62 years ago
- Parent institution: World Learning
- President: Carol Jenkins (acting)
- Academic staff: 4 FT / 26 PT
- Students: 640 (2023)
- Undergraduates: 558 (2023)
- Postgraduates: 82
- Location: Brattleboro, Vermont, United States
- Campus: Rural
- Website: www.sit.edu

The School for International Training, widely known by its initials SIT, is a private non-profit regionally-accredited institution headquartered in Brattleboro, Vermont, United States. The institution has two main divisions. SIT Graduate Institute administers a wide range of internationally-focused master's degree programs as well as doctorate degrees in Global Education, Sustainability, and International Relations. SIT Study Abroad administers undergraduate study abroad programs which combine field-based experiential learning with academic research or internship opportunities.

SIT is accredited by the New England Commission of Higher Education. The school itself is a unit of World Learning, a non-profit international development and education organization that began in 1932 as an international exchange program called the Experiment in International Living.

== History ==
Established in 1964, the Vermont campus of SIT served as the first training site for the newly-founded Peace Corps and originally consisted of a small collection of dorms around a Carriage House on a scenic farm on the north end of Brattleboro. Here, early Peace Corps volunteers took lessons in foreign languages with materials and teachers from the language training from their service, and The School for International Training began to expand its offerings. By 1968, the small but increasing number of returned Peace Corps volunteers were requesting a degree in Teaching English as a Second Language, a new specialty. In 1969, two graduate programs were developed, International Career Training (ICT), and Masters in Teaching Languages (MAT) (French, Spanish and ESL). An undergraduate program, the World Issues Program (WIP), was developed in 1973 and resulted in 26 graduating classes. The WIP program was based on an experiential learning model. Students received their BA in International or Community Development, and International Studies. The last WIP class graduated in 1999.

The first MAT class consisted of three students, the second of 28 students, and the third of 38; in the fourth year the class size reached 50 students and stayed there for many years. ICTs spent part of their program on campus and part in internships around the world. MATs originally went to Mexico or Quebec for student teaching but by 1972, students began to develop other sites around the world. Eventually, the ICT program changed to PIM: Programs in Intercultural Management and developed specializations in NGS's and Civil Society, Peace and Conflict Transformation, Social Justice, Socially Responsible Management, Sustainable Development, International Education, Language and Culture, Teacher Preparation. Jody Williams, an MAT graduate, won the Nobel Prize for her work on banning land mines. Wangari Maathai, former Trustee Emerita, won the Nobel Peace Prize for her work on sustainable development and democracy in Kenya.

In the late 1990s the MAT department created the Teacher Knowledge Project as a way for teachers to work together using the reflective cycle (to inquire into their practice) and principles of Experiential Learning. This project resulted in research in schools in New England focusing on reflective teaching, mentoring and structured language immersion. Other offshoots of the MAT program include a four-week TESOL Certificate program that offers basic preparation for teaching English as a second or foreign language and the ACCESS program that helps content teachers develop skills for working with English language learners in their classes.

Over the years, the School for International Training hosted and worked with Nord-Amerika Somera Kursaro (NASK), BRAC, OTEP, USAID and other international groups through the World Learning network.

== SIT Study Abroad ==
SIT Study Abroad offers undergraduate study abroad programs on all seven continents, focusing on cultural immersion, field-based learning, and experiential learning. Programs are divided via geography and critical global issues, including Climate & Environment, Development & Inequality, Education & Social Change, Geopolitics & Power, Global Health & Well-being, Identity & Human Resilience, and Peace & Justice. Since 2007, the International Honors Program (IHP) has been a division of SIT Study Abroad. IHP programs typically spend the semester traveling to three different continents while focusing on a central academic theme that falls within the aforementioned critical global issues. IHP had previously been an independent non-profit organization before its merger into SIT.

In keeping with the mission of the overall organization, SIT's programs focus on social justice and intercultural communication. SIT was the first study abroad program to achieve net-zero energy status.

== SIT Graduate Institute ==
SIT Graduate institute offers master's degrees and certificates in low-residency formats and global MAs in which students study at SIT centers abroad. The SIT Graduate Institute also delivers a Doctor of Education degree in Global Education and PhDs in Sustainability and International Relations. In addition, SIT grants graduate certificates in International Education and peacebuilding (via a summer program called Conflict Transformation Across Cultures, or CONTACT).

Like the SIT Study Abroad programs, all graduate degree programs are based on seven "critical global issues" which include Climate & Environment, Development & Inequality, Education & Social Change, Geopolitics & Power, Global Health & Well-being, Identity & Human Resilience, and Peace & Justice.

In prior years, degree programs were largely delivered in-person on the SIT campus in Brattleboro, Vermont or in the World Learning center in Washington, DC. In January 2018, SIT announced a change of degree offerings and formats, replacing full-time, on-campus master's programs with a global degree format. Low-residency and certificate programs still take place on the Vermont campus several weeks each year. Global degrees take place in up to three countries relevant to the degree focus. In the 2018-2019 school year, there were 199 full- and part-time students at SIT.

In 2019, SIT Graduate Institute received the U.S. State Department's English Language Fellow Top Producing Institution Award, recognizing that SIT has produced the largest number of Fellows.

The institute is regionally accredited by the New England Commission of Higher Education. It was originally accredited in 1974, and most recently reaccredited in 2023.

== Administration and faculty ==
The school's website currently lists 19 core faculty members, including six department chairs and one program director; as well as senior practitioners and adjunct faculty.

== Notable alumni ==
- Haruko Arimura, Japanese Liberal Democratic Party (LDP) politician
- Gamal Helal, Senior Diplomatic Interpretery & Policy Adviser, United States Department of State
- Kate Hennessy, writer and activist
- James V. Fenelon, sociologist, poet, author, and academic
- Richard W. Roberts, United States District Court judge
- Richard Ryscavage, S.J., Director of Center for Faith and Public Life and Professor of Sociology and International Studies at Fairfield University, nationally known expert on immigration and refugees
- Pamela White, United States Ambassador to Haiti
- Jody Williams, MAT Class of 1984 - recipient of the 1997 Nobel Peace Prize

== See also ==
- Experiment in International Living
- Peace Corps
- World Learning
