= Clint Carroll =

Native American anthropologist and ethnobotanist in Colorado, U.S.

Clint Carroll PhD
- Education: University of California–Berkeley, PhD
- Awards: NSU Sequoyah Fellow (2024)
- Scientific career
- Fields: botany, ethnobotany
- Workplaces: Cherokee Nation
- Website: www.colorado.edu/cnais/clint-carroll

Clint Carroll is a Native American author, associate professor of Ethnic Studies at the University of Colorado, Boulder, anthropologist, and ethnobotanist. He is a citizen of the Cherokee Nation, and his focus of research is on the Cherokee people exploring land conservation and land-based education.

== Background and education ==
Carroll grew up in metropolitan Dallas, Texas and was part of the first generation in his family to graduate college. He holds a bachelor's degree in Environmental Science, Policy, and Management as well as a minor in American Indian Studies, from the University of Arizona. He earned his PhD in Environmental Science, Policy, and Management at the University of California, Berkeley, where he was also involved with American Indian Graduate Program, AISES (American Indian Science and Engineering Society), and the American Indian Grad Student Association, in 2011.

Initially, Carroll attended the University of North Texas; he transferred to a community college after one year there and gained an interest in anthropology from one of his instructors, which he pursued at the University of Arizona. While there, he conducted environmental research in Mexico and the Bahamas. Carroll spent four years at the University of Minnesota, Twin Cities as a post-doctoral associate and assistant professor after obtaining his PhD. He studied Indigenous political ecology.

== Career ==
Carroll works with Cherokee people who reside in Oklahoma on the matter of land conservation and on land-based knowledge. He is also a citizen of the Cherokee Nation.

Carroll has also been a fellow of the National Institutes of Health's Native Investigator Development Program, the Ford Foundation, the Udall Foundation, the National Science Foundation, Northeastern State University, and the U.S. Environmental Protection Agency. He gave a speech entitled "Reuniting with Our Lands and Waters: Indigenous Access and Political Ecology in Settler States" for Harvard Anthropology's Seminar Series in October 2023, and after receiving his 2024 fellowship at Northeastern State University, he delivered a presentation entitled "Knowing the Land: Access, Conservation and Land-Based Education in the Cherokee Nation" in February 2024 there; in the presentation, he advocated for the passing down of generational Cherokee knowledge and for Indigenous lands' protection. He is cited in Indigenous Resurgence: Decolonialization and Movements Toward Environmental Justice, a book published in 2022 and written by Paul Berne Burrow, Samara Brock, and Michael R. Dove; in it, he was quoted for statements describing Indigenous sovereignty and its significance to tribal identity.

Carroll was also involved in the passage of an agreement in 2022 between the United States' National Park Service and the Cherokee nation that illegalized the unauthorized removal of plants along Arkansas' Buffalo River and was supportive of the agreement especially for its benefits for the plants in the area. He is an associate professor of Ethnic Studies at the University of Colorado, Boulder.

Carroll continues to involve himself with AISES and serves as a mentor for Lighting the Pathway to Faculty Careers for Natives in STEM, one of its programs. He is a co-applicant for Ărramăt, a project based in Canada that focuses on creating and increasing opportunities for Indigenous peoples to steward land and conduct research projects. He also began a project in July 2017 at the University of Colorado, Boulder focused on encouraging the passing down of Indigenous cultural knowledge and practices. Funded by the Faculty Early Career Development Award, a grant from the National Science Foundation and lasting five years, the project trained five Cherokee undergraduate students and one graduate student on tribal knowledge with the end objective being for the undergraduate students to create an environmental education curriculum plan, and the graduate student to be trained in the Comparative Ethnic Studies PhD program with Carroll. In addition, research carried out during this project pertained not only to cultural knowledge but also to environmental and climate shifts. The project was completed in Oklahoma cities with relatively high populations of Cherokee individuals.

In 2024, Carroll was named Northeastern State University's Sequoyah Fellow.

== Selected publications ==
- Carroll, Clint. Roots of our Renewal: Ethnobotany and Cherokee Environmental Governance. U of Minnesota P, 2015.
