= Dina Gilio-Whitaker =

American journalist from California, U.S.

- Born: California, United States
- Citizenship: American

Academic background
- Education: University of New Mexico

Academic work
- Discipline: American Indian Studies
- Institutions: California State University San Marcos
- Notable works: "All the Real Indians Died Off"; As Long as Grass Grows

Dina Gilio-Whitaker is an American academic, journalist, and author, who studies Native Americans in the United States, decolonization, and environmental justice. She is a Colville Confederated Tribes direct descendant. In 2019, she published As Long as Grass Grows.

== Early life and education ==
Dina Gilio-Whitaker is a direct descendant of the Confederated Tribes of the Colville Reservation with Okanogan and Sinixt ancestry. Her mother was a Colville tribal citizen. Gilio-Whitaker was born and grew up in Southern California.

As a mature student, Gilio-Whitaker studied at the University of New Mexico, initially intending to go into a legal career. Her master's thesis, Panhe at the Crossroads: Toward an Indigenized Environmental Justice Discourse, was on the topic of Indigenous American protests against a toll road being built on sacred land that was also a significant surfing location.

== Career ==
In 2016, Gilio-Whitaker co-authored "All the Real Indians Died Off" and 20 Other Myths About Native Americans with Roxanne Dunbar-Ortiz. In 2017, she wrote a chapter of The Critical Surfer Reader (2017) titled "Appropriating Surfing and the Politics of Indigenous Authenticity".

Since 2017, Gilio-Whitaker has lectured in American Indian Studies at California State University San Marcos, commuting from San Clemente, California. She was offered the position a year earlier, but declined due to book tour responsibilities. She supports a scholarly framework known as "indigenized environmental justice", in which environmentalism would take into account "the history of colonization as a historical process of dispossession of native peoples and their lands in order to understand the way native people are still fighting these battles".

In 2019, Gilio-Whitaker published As Long as Grass Grows. The book outlines the effect of American settlers on indigenous Americans since 1492, the modern environmentalism movement and indigenous approaches to environmental stewardship.

Gilio-Whitaker is also a senior research associate and policy director at the Center for World Indigenous Studies. She runs the company DGW Consulting. She has also volunteered for the Institute for Women Surfers, Native Like Water and the San Onofre Parks Foundation. She maintains a blog, Ruminative.

== Personal ==
In 1980, Gilio-Whitaker moved to North Shore in the Hawaiian Islands. She returned to California, got married, and moved to San Clemente, California. She is a surfer.

== Selected works ==
=== Books ===
- Dunbar-Ortiz, Roxanne; Gilio-Whitaker, Dina (2016). "All the Real Indians Died Off" and 20 Other Myths About Native Americans. Beacon Press.
- Gilio-Whitaker, Dina (2019). As Long as Grass Grows. Beacon Press.
- Gilio-Whitaker, Dina (2025). Who Gets to Be Indian?: Ethnic Fraud, Disenrollment, and other Difficult Conversations about Native American Identity. Boston: Beacon Press. ISBN 978-0-8070-4496-4.

=== Journal articles ===
- Gilio-Whitaker, Dina (2015). "Idle No More and Fourth World Social Movements in the New Millennium". South Atlantic Quarterly. 114 (4): 866–877. doi:10.1215/00382876-3157391.
- Gilio-Whitaker, Dina (2015–2016). "Fourth World Nations' Collision with Capitalism in the United States". Fourth World Journal. 13 (2).

=== News articles ===
- Gilio-Whitaker, Dina (May 15, 2017). "Beachfront Nuclear Wasteland in Southern California?". Indian Country Today.
- Gilio-Whitaker, Dina (November 29, 2018). "How Native Americans in the arts are preserving tradition in a changing world". Los Angeles Times.
