= Speckled Snake =

19th-century Muscogee leader

Speckled Snake was a pseudonym for a purported Muscogee leader. A speech, likely written by Cherokee leader John Ridge, is attributed to Speckled Snake in 1829 and opposed Indian Removal proposed by Andrew Jackson.

== Historiography ==
While some sources treat Speckled Snake as a Muscogee warrior, historian Angie Debo argues that Speckled Snake was a pseudonym likely used by the influential Cherokee leader John Ridge.

== Speech ==
"Brothers! We have heard the talk of our great father; it is very kind, he says he loves his red children. Brothers! I have listened to many talks from our great father. When he first came over the wide waters, he was but a little man, and wore a red coat. Our chiefs met him on the banks of the river Savannah, and smoked with him the pipe of peace. His legs were cramped by sitting long in his big boat, and he begged for a little land to light his fire on. He said he had come over the wide waters to teach Indians new things, and to make them happy. He said he loved his red brothers, which is very kind. The Muscogees gave the white man land, and kindled him a fire, that he might warm himself; and when his enemies, the pale faces of the south, made war on him, their young men drew the tomahawk, and protected his head from the scalping knife."

"But when the white man had warmed himself before the Indian's fire, and filled himself with their hominy, he became very large. With a step he bestrode the mountains, and his feet covered the plains and the valleys. His hands grasped the eastern and western sea, and his head rested on the moon. Then he became our Great Father. He loved his red children, and he said, "Get a little further, lest I tread on thee." With one foot he pushed the red man over the Oconee, and with the other he trampled down the graves of his fathers and the forests where he had so long hunted the deer. But our great father still loved his red children, and he soon made them another talk. He said, "Get a little further; you are too near me." But there were some bad men among the Muscogees then, as there are now. They lingered around the graves of their ancestors, till they were crushed beneath the heavy tread of our great father. Their teeth pierced his feet, and made him angry. Yet, he continued to love his red children; and when he found them too slow in moving, he sent his great guns before him to sweep his path."

"Brothers! I have listened to a great many talks from our great father. But they always begin and ended in this- "Get a little further, you are too near me." Brothers! Our great father says that "where we are now, our white brothers have always claimed the land." He speaks with a straight tongue, and cannot lie. But when he first came over the wide waters, while he was yet small, and stood before the great chief at the council on Yamacraw Bluff, he said "Give me a little land, which you can spare, and I shall pay you for it." Brothers! When our great father made us a talk, on a former occasion, and said, "Get a little further, go beyond the Oconee, the Ocmulgee; there is a pleasant country," he also said "It shall be yours forever."

"I have listened to his present talk. He says that the land where you now live is not yours. Go beyond the Mississippi; there is game; and you may remain "while the grass grows or the water runs." Brothers! Will not our great father come there also? He loves his red children. He speaks with a strait tongue, and will not lie. Brothers! Our great father says that our bad men have made his heart bleed, for the murder of one of his white children. Yet where are the red children which he loves, once as numerous as the leaves of the forest? How many have been murdered by his warriors? How many have been crushed beneath his own footsteps? Brothers! Our great father says we must go beyond the Mississippi. We shall be there under his care, and experience his kindness. He is very good! We have felt it all before. Brothers! I have done."
