= James V. Fenelon =

American sociologist, poet, author

- Occupations: Sociologist, poet, author, and academic

Academic background
- Education: BA in Communication Arts; MIA in Intercultural Management; MAT in Teaching Languages; Certificate of Advanced Studies; PhD in Sociology
- Alma mater: Loyola Marymount University; School for International Training; School for International Training (VT); Harvard Graduate School of Education; Northwestern University
- Thesis: "Culturicide, Resistance, Survival: Cultural Domination of Lakota Oyate" (1995)

James V. Fenelon is an American sociologist, poet, author, and academic; Professor of Sociology and Director of the Center for Indigenous Peoples Studies at California State University, San Bernardino. Fenelon's academic work has revolved around Indigenous Peoples, centering on disparities related to race/ethnicity, class, social policy, global climate change, and cultural sovereignty of Native Nations, exploring global issues such as World-systems analysis, globalization, urban and political affairs, international/intercultural matters, and environmental racism. He authored the books Culturicide, Resistance and Survival of the Lakota in 1998, Indigenous Peoples and Globalization, Resistance and Revitalization in 2009, Redskins? Sports Mascots, Indian Nations and White Racism in 2017, and Indian, Black and Irish: Indigenous Nations, African Peoples, European Invasions – 1492–1790 in 2023.

== Education ==
After serving in the U.S. Navy (1972–76), Fenelon went to Loyola Marymount University, Los Angeles, California, completed a Bachelor of Arts in Communication Arts in 1978; in 1981 earned a Master of International Administration from the School for International Training in Brattleboro, Vermont with a thesis titled "Towards Social Consciousness"; earned a Master of Arts in teaching, thesis titled "The Martinique Workshops: In-service Teacher Training" in 1983. In the Caribbean, East Asian countries, and Indigenous Nations, he continued academic pursuits, towards comparative sociology, doing Advanced Studies at Harvard, earning a PhD from Northwestern University in 1995, with the thesis: "Culturicide, Resistance, Survival: Cultural Domination of Lakota Oyate".

== Career ==
Fenelon began teaching as an (ESL) Instructor at the Haitian-American Institute, coordination of language workshops in Martinique in 1983, held teaching positions at the Shanghai International Studies University in China (1983–84), and Coordinator/Instructor of Teaching English to Speakers of Other Languages (TESOL) at institutions around Tokyo including SONY, Newport University in Japan, SUMITOMO (1984–85), and Lecturer at the Universiti Teknologi MARA and University of Maryland in Malaysia in 1985 and University of Texas consortium in 1986. He served as Project Director at Standing Rock College, ND (1987–88), and Trainer/Coordinator at the Midwest Multifunctional Bilingual Education Resource Center, Des Plaines, IL (1988–1992). Upon completing his PhD, he became assistant professor at John Carroll University, and joined California State University, San Bernardino as assistant professor of sociology in 1999, associate professor in 2002, and 2005 professor of sociology; and Lang Visiting Professor for Social Change at Swarthmore College, 2021 to 2023.

He was workshop Director in Languages at Chambre de Commerce, Fort-de-France, briefly served North Dakota's Indian Education Office and Economic Development Commission in 1988 and is founding Director of the Center for Indigenous Peoples Studies at California State University, San Bernardino. He worked with the Water Resources Policy Institute for the CSU, and on ethnohistory of Lenape: hoking.

== Research ==
Fenelon's research on Indigenous communities contributed to understanding the cultural domination of Native Nations and struggles of American Indians over sovereignty, along with global issues of race and racism; authored numerous publications: books, and more than 40 peer-reviewed articles.

He was Principal Investigator of "Native American/Tribal Water and Land – Listening Sessions," and Senior Research Fellow on "Indigenous Perspectives on Water, Land & Traditional Culture" titled Water Talks.

=== Indigenous peoples and globalization ===
Fenelon's research highlighted survivance, resistance, and resurgence communities. He wrote the book Indigenous Peoples and Globalization, Resistance, and Revitalization in this area, with reviewers noting that "despite their unique cultural and historical origins, all indigenous resistance movements share some common features because they are all formed in reaction to state oppression". He introduced models for indigenous movements, and resistance to state domination in the context of neoliberalism. He has worked on indigenous environmental sociology and (with Kari Marie Norgaard) in Towards an Indigenous Environmental Sociology.

=== Racism ===
Fenelon has conducted research on race and structural racism. In Culturicide, Resistance and Survival of the Lakota ("Sioux Nation"), he developed theories and methodologies of the domination of Native Americans. Redskins? Sports Mascots, Indian Nations and White Racism examines team names in institutional racism. In Immigration as Racial Dominance Since 1492, he analyzed migration, and in Indian, Black and Irish: Indigenous Nations, African Peoples, European Invasions, 1492–1790 he focused on supremacy and sovereignty, employed in building colonial and capitalist global domination.

== Bibliography ==
=== Books ===
- Culturicide, Resistance and Survival of the Lakota (“Sioux Nation”) (1998) ISBN 978-0-8153-3119-3
- Indigenous Peoples and Globalization, Resistance and Revitalization with Thomas Hall (2009) ISBN 978-1-59451-658-0
- Redskins? Sports Mascots, Indian Nations and White Racism (2017) ISBN 978-1-61205-740-8
- Indian, Black and Irish: Indigenous Nations, African Peoples, European Invasions (2023) ISBN 978-1-003-31508-7

=== Selected book chapters ===
- Fenelon, J. V., & LeBeau, D. (2006). Four directions for Indian Education: Curriculum models for Lakota/Dakota teaching & learning, in Indigenous Education & Empowerment: International Perspectives, editors: Ismael Abu-Saad & Duane Champagne, (Alta Mira) indigenous and minority education, 21–68.
- Fenelon, J. V. (2018). The Struggle of Indigenous Americans: A Socio-Historical View. Handbook of the Sociology of Racial and Ethnic Relations, 9–31.
- Fenelon, J. V. (2021). Immigration as Racial Dominance Since 1492: Migration and the Modern World-System of the Americas. In Migration, Racism and Labor Exploitation in the World-System (pp. 11–28). Routledge.

=== Selected articles ===
- Fenelon, J. V. (1997). From peripheral domination to internal colonialism: Socio-political change of the Lakota on Standing Rock. Journal of World-Systems Research, 259–320. doi:10.5195/jwsr.1997.110
- Fenelon, J. (2003). Race, research, and tenure: Institutional credibility and the incorporation of African, Latino, and American Indian faculty. Journal of Black Studies, 34(1), 87–100. doi:10.1177/0021934703253661
- Fenelon, J. V., & Murguía, S. J. (2008). Indigenous peoples: Globalization, resistance, and revitalization. American Behavioral Scientist, 51(12), 1656–1671.
- Fenelon, J. V., & C. E. Trafzer. (2014). From Colonialism to Denial of California Genocide to Mis-Representation: Indigenous Struggles in the Americas. American Behavioral Scientist, 58, No.1. doi:10.1177/000276421349504
- Fenelon, J. V. (2016). Genocide, race, capitalism: Synopsis of formation within the modern world-system. Journal of World-Systems Research, 22(1), 23–30. doi:10.5195/jwsr.2016.607
- Fenelon, J., & Alford, J. (2020). Envisioning Indigenous Models for Social and Ecological Change in the Anthropocene. Journal of World-Systems Research, 26(2), 372. doi:10.5195/jwsr.2020.996
