= 1821 Land Lottery =

Georgia lottery to redistribute Native lands

The 1821 Land Lottery was the fourth lottery of the Georgia Land Lotteries, a lottery system used by the U.S. state of Georgia between the years 1805 and 1833 to expropriate Cherokee and Muscogee land and redistribute it to American settlers. The 1821 lottery was authorized by the Georgia General Assembly by an act of May 16, 1821. The lottery redistributed land in Dooly, Fayette, Henry, Houston, and Monroe counties. The expropriated land was divided into lots 202.5 acres in size which served as prizes in the lottery.

Registration for the lottery occurred in the two months after the Act's publication on May 16, 1821, with drawings occurring between November 7 and December 12, 1821. Fortunate drawers from the previous Georgia land lotteries were excluded, as well as draft resisters who refused to fight in the War of 1812 or the Indian Wars, criminals, tax defaulters, and absconders for debt. The lottery was open to free white males, with some special rules related to soldiers, orphans, and widows.

== List of fortunate drawers ==
Name of Draw	Residence CO./DIST.	Lot Number	District	County of Draw	Moved To	Moved To
Abbet, Barton	Gwinnett Tippins	29	9	Monroe	Pike County	
Abbet, Barton	Gwinnett Tippins	29	9	Monroe	Pike County	
Abbott, Eli	Baldwin McCrarys	140	4	Monroe	Butts Co.	
Abbott, John Jr	Effingham 9th Dist.	112	4	Monroe	Butts Co.	
Abercrombie, John	Hancock Daniel	206	13	Monroe	Bibb Co.	
Abercromby, Thomas	Walton Echols	126	8	Monroe	Pike County	
Ackridge, Wm.	Warren Harris	151	2	Monroe	Pike County	Spalding Co.
Acrage, Elizabeth (Wid)	Burke Palmers	68	8	Monroe	Pike County	Lamar Co.
Adams, Amos	Wilkinson Mims	179	1	Monroe	Pike County	
Adams, David F.	Emanuel Jordens	25	7	Monroe	Pike County	Lamar Co.
Adams, Gillis J.	Walton Richs	81	12	Monroe		
Adams, Henry Jr.	Warren Hutchinsons	309	13	Monroe	Bibb Co.	
Adams, Jane (Wid)	Chatham Rowells	4	2	Monroe	Pike County	
Adams, John	Warren Hutchinsons	87	1	Monroe	Pike County	Spalding Co.
Adams, John	Elbert Burdells	246	7	Monroe	Lamar Co.	
Adams, John C.	Elbert Wards	56	13	Monroe		
Adams, Susan (Orp)	Putnam Walkers	158	10	Monroe	Pike County	Upson Co.
Adams, Thomas F.	Elbert Doolies	28	9	Monroe	Pike County	
Aderhold, George	Franklin Burtons	234	10	Monroe	Pike County	Upson Co.
Ades, James R.	Richmond Burtons	146	7	Monroe	Lamar Co.	
Adkinson, Lucy (Wid)	Jones Phillips	248	2	Monroe	Pike County	Spalding Co.
Afred, Guilford	Columbia Wilsons	163	15	Monroe	Pike County	Upson Co.
Aikin, John Jr.	Morgan Sheppards	165	4	Monroe	Butts Co.	
Aikins, Daniel	Jasper Barnes	22	1	Monroe	Pike County	Spalding Co.
Akin, Edward R.	Clarke Davis	52	1	Monroe	Pike County	Spalding Co.
Akins, John	Greene Astins	121	3	Monroe	Pike County	
Akridge, Ezekiel	Baldwin McGees	105	1	Monroe	Pike County	Spalding Co.
Albertson, William	Hall Hammonds	197	7	Monroe	Lamar Co.	
Albritten, William	Twiggs Chains	242	15	Monroe	Pike County	Upson Co.
Albritton, Amos	Columbia Clietts	85	14	Monroe	Butts Co.	
Albritton, James	Burke Lodge's	234	4	Monroe	Butts Co.	
Albritton, John	Franklin Holdonback 109	109	13	Monroe	Bibb Co.	
Aldredge, Wiliam	Wilkes Barksdales 74	74	7	Monroe	Pike County	Lamar Co.
Alexander, Albert	Jasper 293rd	63	1	Monroe	Pike County	Spalding Co.
Alexander, Collin W.	Jones Phillips	9	8	Monroe	Pike County	Lamar Co.
Alexander, Joseph	Wilkes Reeves	201	4	Monroe	Butts Co.	
Alexander, Mathew	Habersham Taylors	106	8	Monroe	Pike County	
Alford, Brittain	Walton Richs	32	13	Monroe		
Alford, Turner	Jones Pitts	33	10	Monroe	Pike County	Upson Co.
Alfred, Jeptha	Jones Pitts	6	9	Monroe	Pike County	
Alfred, Nedom	Columbia Fews	86	1	Monroe	Pike County	Spalding Co.
Algood, Memory	Elbert Almonds	156	1	Monroe	Pike County	
Allday, Richard (Orphs)	Burke Cavanahs	178	3	Monroe		
Allen, Charles	Morgan Stephens	11	9	Monroe	Pike County	
Allen, Charles	Morgan Sheppards	75	12	Monroe		
Allen, Cuzza	Baldwin Whites	125	15	Monroe	Pike County	Upson Co.
Allen, David	Jasper Johns	130	5	Monroe		
Allen, Isaac	Telfair Lamkins	50	4	Monroe		
Allen, James	Habersham Ritches	102	1	Monroe	Pike County	Spalding Co.
Allen, James	Franklin Burtons	152	2	Monroe	Pike County	Spalding Co.
Allen, James	Burke Cavenahs	238	7	Monroe	Lamar Co.	
Allen, Robert	Greene Allens	193	1	Monroe	Pike County	
Allen, William	Jasper Wallis	155	7	Monroe	Lamar Co.	
Allen, William	Putnam Baughs	5	11	Monroe	Lamar Co.	
Alley, James	Baldwin Hawes	4	7	Monroe	Pike County	Lamar Co.
Alley, Wm. D.	Clarke Dickens	69	3	Monroe	Pike County	
Allison, Alfred	Greene Scotts	145	13	Monroe		
Alston, James Jr.	Montgomery Adams	33	2	Monroe	Pike County	
Alston, Joshua H.	Twiggs Blackshears	127	8	Monroe	Pike County	
Ames, Barrett	Richmond Brantley	30	12	Monroe		
Amis, John W.	Greene Scotts	233	2	Monroe	Pike County	Spalding Co.
Anders, Thomas	Scriven Bufords	71	2	Monroe	Pike County	
Anderson, Carolus	Burke McCullers	99	2	Monroe	Pike County	
Anderson, George W.	Chatham Raifords	183	3	Monroe		
Anderson, James	Habersham Suttons	63	8	Monroe	Pike County	Lamar Co.
Anderson, John	Glynn Mannings	119	11	Monroe	Lamar Co.	
Anderson, John R. (Orps)	Wilkes Mirees	148	1	Monroe	Pike County	
Anderson, Joseph	Scriven Douglass	186	13	Monroe		
Anderson, Joseph S.	Jasper John	224	7	Monroe	Lamar Co.	
Anderson, Lucy T. (Wid)	Jones Flowers	187	3	Monroe		
Anderson, Timothy	Madison Stricklands	134	10	Monroe	Pike County	Upson Co.
Anderson, William Sr.	Wilkes Mattox	236	6	Monroe		
Andress, David Sr.	Putnam Tomlinson	245	8	Monroe	Pike County	
Andrew, John (Orps)	Hancock Johnsons	39	6	Monroe		
Andrews, Harvey	Burke Jourdens	131	13	Monroe		
Andrews, John	Scriven Bracks	74	5	Monroe		
Andrews, John	Wilkes Thurmonds	77	8	Monroe	Pike County	Lamar Co.
Andrews, John H.	Twiggs Thames	141	9	Monroe	Pike County	
Andrews, Michael (Orps)	Wilkes Thurmonds	16	8	Monroe	Pike County	Lamar Co.
Andrews, Samuel	Burke Cavenahs	54	8	Monroe	Pike County	Lamar Co.
Anthony, Wm. A. (Orp)	Wilkes Thurmons	158	4	Monroe	Butts Co.	
Apleby, James	Jackson Olivers	149	4	Monroe	Butts Co.	
Appling, David	Laurens Marthers	175	4	Monroe	Butts Co.	
Archer, Frederick	Hancock Swints	57	5	Monroe		
Ard, James (Orps)	Wilkinson Jordans	27	5	Monroe		
Argelear, John	Jones Permenters	195	8	Monroe	Pike County	
Armes, Newton D.	Wilkes Hudspeths	244	3	Monroe		
Armor, John	Greene Scotts	170	2	Monroe	Pike County	Spalding Co.
Armstrong, James	Greene Leftwich's	116	1	Monroe	Pike County	Spalding Co.
Arnold, Henry	Washington Oquins	82	12	Monroe		
Arnold, Owen	Wilkes Reeves	82	14	Monroe	Butts Co.	
Arnold, Thomas	Washington Floyds	218	7	Monroe	Lamar Co.	
Arnstoff, John	Effingham 11th Dist.	200	11	Monroe	Pike County	
Arnstorff, Jonathan	Effingham 11th Dist.	28	5	Monroe		
Arrant, Peter Sr.	Lincoln Blalocks	251	10	Monroe	Pike County	Upson Co.
Arrant, Wm. Sr.	Lincoln Blalocks	13	2	Monroe	Pike County	Spalding Co.
Arrea, Bradley	Putnam Coopers	168	15	Monroe	Pike County	Upson Co.
Arthur, William A.	Baldwin Milledgeville	124	7	Monroe	Pike County	
Asberry, John	Hancock Huffs	25	9	Monroe	Pike County	
Ashfield, Johnson	Putnam Jurnigans	272	11	Monroe	Pike County	Upson Co.
Ashley, Thomas	Columbia Clietts	232	4	Monroe	Butts Co.	
Ashmore, Pinton	Jasper Barnes	235	1	Monroe	Pike County	
Ashton, Phillip	Chatham Rowells	208	12	Monroe		
Askew, James	Laurens Smiths	228	13	Monroe		
Athridge, Maxy	Montgomery Adams	207	4	Monroe	Butts Co.	
Atkerson, Charlotte (Wid)	Morgan Fitzpatrick	118	2	Monroe	Pike County	Spalding Co.
Atkins, Abigal (Orp)	Scriven Burnes	48	11	Monroe		
Atkins, Martha (Orp)	Scriven Burnes	48	11	Monroe		
Atkins, Millington (Orp)	Scriven Burnes	48	11	Monroe		
Atkins, Orville	Putnam Bledsoe	30	13	Monroe		
Atkins, Walton (Orp)	Scriven Burnes	48	11	Monroe		
Atkinson, Lazarus	Greene Slaughters	74	6	Monroe		
Atkinson, Nathan	Greene Astins	128	4	Monroe	Butts Co.	
Atterway, Joseph Sr.	Franklin Cokers	179	3	Monroe		
Austin, Michael Sr.	Gwinnett Ellisons	130	6	Monroe		
Avent, Josiah B.	Washington Williams	83	14	Monroe	Butts Co.	
Awbrey, Benjamin	Morgan Hendersons	153	3	Monroe	Lamar Co.	
Awtry, Cornelius (Orp)	Morgan Wagnons	196	4	Monroe	Butts Co.	
Axson, Samuel J.	Liberty Mells	195	9	Monroe	Pike County	
Aydett, William	Jones Haws	140	1	Monroe	Pike County	
Ayers, Asa	Franklin Williams	148	9	Monroe	Pike County	
Babcock, John W.	Chatham Mills	159	12	Monroe		
Backholt, Silas	Greene Rankins	73	10	Monroe	Pike County	Upson Co.
Bacon, Thomas W.	Greene Leftwichs	255	15	Monroe	Pike County	Upson Co.
Baggs, Wm.	Jeffersons Smiths	177	4	Monroe	Butts Co.	
Baid, Richard J.	Jasper Thorntons	197	12	Monroe		
Bailey, Elijah	Oglethorpe Cardwells	43	9	Monroe	Pike County	
Bailey, Henry	Wilkinson Pierces	89	9	Monroe	Pike County	
Bailey, William	Gwinnett Ellisons	137	5	Monroe		
Bailey, William	Morgan Nelsons	112	8	Monroe	Pike County	Lamar Co.
Bailly, Aron	Chatham Raifords	149	8	Monroe	Pike County	
Bains, John	Chatham De Lyons	182	6	Monroe		
Baird, James	Wilkes Coopers	212	5	Monroe		
Baity, William (Orps)	Burke McCullers	141	11	Monroe	Pike County	Upson Co.
Baker, Charles	Franklin Turkes	150	15	Monroe	Pike County	Upson Co.
Baker, Green W.	Gwinnett Penleys	85	15	Monroe	Pike County	Upson Co.
Baker, Henry	Warren Torrence	62	10	Monroe	Pike County	Upson Co.
Baker, Jordan	Walton Richs	191	5	Monroe		
Baker, Martha (Wid0	Warren Torrences	144	2	Monroe	Pike County	Spalding Co.
Baker, Thomas	Montgomery Adams	261	11	Monroe	Pike County	Upson Co.
Baker, William	Hancock Fannins	62	14	Monroe		
Baldwin, Samuel	Oglethorpe 226	19	2	Monroe	Pike County	Spalding Co.
Baley, James	Warren Harris	42	13	Monroe		
Baley, Samuel	Richmonds Winters	209	4	Monroe	Butts Co.	
Baley, Wm. (Orps)	Pulaski Landis	80	13	Monroe		
Ball, Green	Warren Blunts	255	1	Monroe	Pike County	
Ballard, James	Franklin Cokers	130	8	Monroe	Pike County	
Ballard, Westley (Orps)	Franklin Cokers	194	15	Monroe	Pike County	Upson Co.
Bankston, Thomas	Walton Davis	193	8	Monroe	Pike County	
Barber, James	Wilkinson Lees	88	6	Monroe		
Barden, John S.	Columbia Bealls	168	8	Monroe	Pike County	
Barefield, Cullen	Burke Wards	84	3	Monroe	Pike County	Spalding Co.
Barefield, Zacheriah F.	Laurens Mathers	196	3	Monroe	Lamar Co.	
Barfield, James	Morgan Shaws	86	9	Monroe	Pike County	
Barham, Timothy	Columbia Colliers	99	11	Monroe	Lamar Co.	
Barker, Darky Ann (Orp)	Jasper Barnes	163	9	Monroe	Pike County	
Barker, John C.	Putnam Bledsoes	159	13	Monroe		
Barker, William	Wilkes Josseys	11	14	Monroe	Butts Co.	
Barker, Wm. Sr.	Wilkinson Lees	175	9	Monroe	Pike County	
Barksdale, Wm. C.	Hancock Huffs	184	9	Monroe	Pike County	
Barkwell, Major	Oglethorpe Bells	26	9	Monroe	Pike County	
Barlow, John (Orps)	Columbia Colliers	104	13	Monroe		
Barnard, James	Chatham Tebeaus	144	4	Monroe	Butts Co.	
Barnard, John	Baldwin Haws	48	10	Monroe	Pike County	Upson Co.
Barnedot, John	Chatham Mills	176	8	Monroe	Pike County	
Barnes, Absalom	Madison Stricklands 69	69	1	Monroe	Pike County	Spalding Co.
Barnes, Absalom	Morgan Talbots	72	4	Monroe		
Barnes, William Jr.	Jones Greshams	248	9	Monroe	Pike County	
Barnes, Willis	Jasper Barnes	6	11	Monroe		
Barnet, John	Greene Allens	149	3	Monroe		
Barnett, Samuel	Wilkes Hillhouse	118	3	Monroe	Pike County	Spalding Co.
Barnett, Samuel	Jackson Scotts	132	9	Monroe	Pike County	
Barnett, Sion	Jasper Whites	50	6	Monroe		
Barnett, Wm. (Orps)	Jackson Mayes	100	11	Monroe	Lamar Co.	
Barns, Henry	Elbert Almonds	131	1	Monroe	Pike County	
Barrett, Samuel	Morgan Wagnons	45	10	Monroe	Pike County	Upson Co.
Barrett, William	Walton Ellisons	218	8	Monroe	Pike County	
Barron, David	Elbert Tatoms	199	12	Monroe		
Barron, Jacob	Jones Burkhalters	250	8	Monroe	Pike County	
Barrow, James Jr.	Baldwin Husons	67	10	Monroe	Pike County	Upson Co.
Barrow, James Sr.	Baldwin Husons	86	4	Monroe		
Barrow, James Sr.	Baldwin Husons	118	8	Monroe	Pike County	
Barrow, Phillip	Jones Stallings	144	9	Monroe	Pike County	
Barrow, Wm.	Jefferson Halls	9	10	Monroe	Pike County	Upson Co.
Barton, Shephered (Orp)	Hall Abercromie	227	12	Monroe		
Barton, Wellborn G.	Wilkes Callaways	101	12	Monroe		
Baskins, James	Gwinnett Bridges	243	6	Monroe		
Bass, Bryant	Jefferson Fountains	101	9	Monroe	Pike County	
Bass, John	Greene Allens	227	9	Monroe	Pike County	
Bass, John	Morgan Harris	96	14	Monroe		
Bass, Sterling	Baldwin Russells	167	2	Monroe	Pike County	
Bassett, Eli	Appling Boyds	265	11	Monroe	Pike County	Upson Co.
Batchelder, Eli	Jackson Scotts	140	10	Monroe	Pike County	Upson Co.
Batemon, David	Twiggs Batemons	27	11	Monroe		
Batemon, John	Twiggs Batemons	347	13	Monroe	Bibb Co.	
Bates, John	Burke McRays	154	10	Monroe	Pike County	Upson Co.
Bates, John A.	Greene Slaughters	121	4	Monroe	Butts Co.	
Bates, Nathaniel	Greene Astins	185	12	Monroe		
Batey, George	Habersham Grants	237	1	Monroe	Pike County	
Battle, Lazarus	Morgan Shaws	136	11	Monroe	Lamar Co.	
Batty, Alfred (Orp)	Chatham Raifords	205	3	Monroe		
Batty, Edward (Orp)	Chatham Raifords	205	3	Monroe		
Baugh, William	Putnam Baughs	22	5	Monroe		
Baulderree, Guidian	Tattnall McInnes	98	2	Monroe	Pike County	
Baxter, James	Madison Bones	79	1	Monroe	Pike County	Spalding Co.
Baxter, James	Madison Bones	202	8	Monroe	Pike County	
Baynard, Nichols S. (Dr.)	Chatham De Lyons	8	8	Monroe	Pike County	Lamar Co.
Baynon, Watkins	Greene Scotts	108	9	Monroe	Pike County	
Bazemore, Reddick	Jones Phillips	195	13	Monroe		
Beach, Henry M. (Orp)	Richmond Brantleys	138	19	Monroe		
Beach, Mary W. (Orp)	Richmond Brantleys	138	19	Monroe		
Beachamp, Levy	Gwinnett Bridges	239	10	Monroe	Pike County	Upson Co.
Beachamp, Levy	Gwinnett Bridges	25	14	Monroe	Butts Co.	
Beal, Abia	Morgan Fitzpatrick 146	146	11	Monroe	Pike County	Upson Co.
Beall, Charles C.	Wilkinson Mims	108	11	Monroe	Lamar Co.	
Beall, Wm. L. (Orp)	Columbia Paynes	213	9	Monroe	Pike County	
Beall, Wm. M.	Warren Jernigans	212	13	Monroe	Bibb Co.	
Bean, Wiley	Jasper Barnes	197	5	Monroe		
Beasley, Samuel	Liberty Frasers	113	9	Monroe	Pike County	
Beaty, Absalom	Laurens Mathers	137	12	Monroe		
Beaty, James	Laurens Stevens	107	10	Monroe	Pike County	Upson Co.
Beaty, James	Laurens Stevens	165	12	Monroe		
Beaty, Rachel (Wid)	Twiggs Griffins	155	4	Monroe	Butts Co.	
Beck, James	Morgan Shaws	161	2	Monroe	Pike County	
Beck, Stephen	Screven Douglass	79	14	Monroe		
Beckham, Thomas	Glynn Mannings	83	6	Monroe		
Beddell, Abner (Orps)	Jones Jefferson	116	15	Monroe	Pike County	Upson Co.
Beddenbock, Mary (Wid)	Effingham 11th	70	11	Monroe	Lamar Co.	
Bedingfield, Martha	Burke Dillards	251	12	Monroe		
Bedingfield, Wm. (Orps)	Jefferson Watkins	97	3	Monroe	Pike County	
Bedstill, Isaac	Jones Jeffersons 230	230	9	Monroe	Pike County	
Beenland, Ausburn	Hall Brooks	86	14	Monroe	Butts Co.	
Belcher, William	Morgan Campbells	79	15	Monroe	Pike County	Upson Co.
Belflower, James	Wilkinson Pierces	228	3	Monroe	Lamar Co.	
Bell, John (Orp)	Richmond Burtons	178	2	Monroe		
Bell, Joseph	Wilkes Harris	220	12	Monroe		
Bell, Joseph	Wilkes Harris	231	12	Monroe		
Bell, Reddock	Twiggs Chains	256	7	Monroe		
Bell, Thomas	Morgan Harris	32	10	Monroe	Pike County	Upson Co.
Bell, Thomas (Orp)	Richmond Burtons	178	2	Monroe	Pike County	Spalding Co.
Bell, William	Elbert Olivers	131	5	Monroe		
Belt, Lloyd	Jefferson Halls	119	3	Monroe	Pike County	Spalding Co.
Bence, William	Morgan Youngs	2	2	Monroe	Pike County	
Bennet, Henry	Hall Brooks	129	9	Monroe	Pike County	
Bennet, William	Washington Coaseys	150	3	Monroe		
Bennett, James W.	Bryan Demeres	203	7	Monroe	Lamar Co.	
Bennett, John	Twiggs Blackshears 217	217	4	Monroe	Butts Co.	
Bennett, John	Jackson Spruces	144	7	Monroe	Lamar Co.	
Bennett, John	Bulloch Duttons	1	8	Monroe	Pike County	Lamar Co.
Bennett, Mary (Wid)	Effingham 11th	17	10	Monroe	Pike County	Upson Co.
Bennett, Stephen	Jackson Spruces	211	6	Monroe		
Bennett, Thomas	Jackson Haggards	116	3	Monroe	Pike County	Spalding Co.
Benning, Rowana E. (Orp)	Baldwin Hussons	89	14	Monroe	Butts Co.	
Benning, Sarah F. (Orp)	Baldwin Husons	89	14	Monroe	Butts Co.	
Benning, Thomas	Columbia Paynes	93	6	Monroe		
Bentley, James	Wilkes Welborns	79	7	Monroe	Pike County	Lamar Co.
Bentley, James (Orps)	Wilkes Mirees	91	12	Monroe		
Bentley, John	Washington Mills	202	4	Monroe	Butts Co.	
Benton, David (Orp)	Bryan Smiths	104	1	Monroe	Pike County	Spalding Co.
Benton, Eliza (Orp)	Bryan Smiths	104	1	Monroe	Pike County	Spalding Co.
Benton, Moses (Orp)	Bryan Smiths	104	1	Monroe	Pike County	Spalding Co.
Benton, Sarah (Orp)	Bryan Smiths	104	1	Monroe	Pike County	Spalding Co.
Benton, Thomas	Jasper Martins	165	2	Monroe	Pike County	
Berry, John	Twiggs Tysons	245	10	Monroe	Pike County	Upson Co.
Berry, Robert	Jones Pitts	93	15	Monroe	Pike County	Upson Co.
Berry, Susan (Wid)	Oglethorpe Huffs	192	6	Monroe		
Berry, William	Hancock Claytons	61	11	Monroe		
Berry, William Sr.	Gwinnett Davis	93	12	Monroe		
Bessent, Mathew	Camden Clarks	169	11	Monroe	Pike County	Upson Co.
Best, William Sr.	Lincoln Walkers	224	9	Monroe	Pike County	
Betton, Chas. F.M.	Pulaski Yarbroughs	206	3	Monroe		
Bevan, Joseph V.	Effingham 11th	210	12	Monroe		
Bickers, Jonathan	Greene Scotts	50	2	Monroe	Pike County	Spalding Co.
Bickers, Sally	Greene Scotts	116	6	Monroe		
Billingslea, Winston	Wilkes Freemans	238	10	Monroe	Pike County	Upson Co.
Billups, John	Clarke Davis	116	11	Monroe	Lamar Co.	
Binnion, John B.	Columbia Hunts	66	15	Monroe	Pike County	Upson Co.
Binns, Augustus	Wilkes Mirees	76	12	Monroe		
Binns, George S.	Wilkes Callaways	206	9	Monroe	Pike County	
Bird, John G.	Baldwin Husons	82	11	Monroe		
Bird, Mary (Wid)	Morgan Morrows	152	13	Monroe		
Bird, Williamson	Wilkes Welborns	31	11	Monroe	Lamar Co.	
Bishop, John A.	Jasper Whites	143	15	Monroe	Pike County	Upson Co.
Bishop, Jones (Orp)	Habersham McCrarys	110	10	Monroe	Pike County	Upson Co.
Black, David	Gwinnett Davis	180	10	Monroe	Pike County	Upson Co.
Black, John	Jefferson Whithams	107	6	Monroe		
Black, Robert	Walton Richs	196	10	Monroe	Pike County	Upson Co.
Black, William	Chatham Thiess	104	6	Monroe		
Blackburn, Daniel	Scriven Douglass	48	5	Monroe		
Blackshear, Enoch	Twiggs Thames	135	4	Monroe	Butts Co.	
Blacksill, Sarah (Orps)	Bryan Demeres	76	8	Monroe	Pike County	Lamar Co.
Blackstock, Daniel	Hall McCutchens	121	2	Monroe	Pike County	
Blackstone, John Jr.	Warren Jones	65	10	Monroe	Pike County	Upson Co.
Blake, Wm.	Effingham 12th	134	9	Monroe	Pike County	
Blakely, John	Jones Permenters 20	20	10	Monroe	Pike County	Upson Co.
Blalock, David	Lincoln Blalock	249	1	Monroe	Pike County	
Blanchard, Benj.	Jones Permenters 232	232	13	Monroe	Bibb Co.	
Blankinship, Agness (Wid)	Franklin Ramseys	107	9	Monroe	Pike County	
Blasingame, John	Morgan Morrows	127	10	Monroe	Pike County	Upson Co.
Blassingame, William	Jasper Ryans	98	3	Monroe	Pike County	
Blaylock, Edmund	Putnam Tomlinson	122	3	Monroe	Pike County	
Bledsoe, Joseph	Oglethorpe Holtzclaw	33	3	Monroe	Pike County	
Bledsoe, Peachy Sr.	Morgan Harris	163	8	Monroe	Pike County	
Blois, Peter	Chatham De Lyons	142	1	Monroe	Pike County	
Bloodsworth, Arnold E.	Morgan Whitakers	91	11	Monroe		
Bloodwirth, Hiram B.	Morgan Whitakers	64	4	Monroe		
Bloodworth, John	Warren Harris	74	12	Monroe		
Blount, Eliza (Wid)	Chatham Scotts	116	5	Monroe		
Blunchet, Phillip	Gwinnett Bridges	87	11	Monroe		
Blunt, Reding	Washington Robisons	138	4	Monroe	Butts Co.	
Boatright, Daniel (Orps)	Laurens McClendon	253	3	Monroe	Lamar Co.	
Boatright, Francis	Wayne O'Neils	47	4	Monroe		
Boggs, George	Jones Coxs	87	9	Monroe	Pike County	
Bohanan, John	Laurens Stevens	202	11	Monroe	Pike County	Upson Co.
Boid, Henry	Jasper Thorntons	25	1	Monroe	Pike County	Spalding Co.
Boles, James Jr.	Jones Flowers	75	1	Monroe	Pike County	Spalding Co.
Bolton, Isaac (Orps)	Wilkes Hudspeths	189	8	Monroe	Pike County	
Bolton, John	Wilkes Coopers	203	6	Monroe		
Boman, Thomas	Morgan Talbot	112	2	Monroe	Pike County	Spalding Co.
Boman, Wade H.	Gwinnett Davis	103	12	Monroe		
Bond, Easom	Madison Powels	34	1	Monroe	Pike County	Spalding Co.
Bond, Joseph B.	Hall Brooks	151	5	Monroe		
Bonds, William S. (Orp)	Jasper Thornton	213	8	Monroe	Pike County	
Bonnell, Anthony (Orps)	Burke Burks	182	4	Monroe	Butts Co.	
Bonnell, Mary Ann (Wid)	Scriven Mills	45	9	Monroe	Pike County	
Bonner, Hamilton	Hancock Nelsons	149	11	Monroe	Pike County	Upson Co.
Bonner, Jonathan	Jasper Dardens	250	6	Monroe		
Booker, James S.	Wilkes Wellborns	204	10	Monroe	Pike County	Upson Co.
Boolar, George (Orp)	Lincoln Graves	212	9	Monroe	Pike County	
Boon, James	Jasper Wallis	61	4	Monroe		
Boon, John	Telfair Lamkins	12	11	Monroe		
Boon, Joshua	Morgan Shaws	194	2	Monroe	Pike County	Lamar Co.
Booth, John T.	Jones Stallings	171	6	Monroe		
Booth, Robert	Greene Gregorys	47	7	Monroe	Pike County	Lamar Co.
Booth, Thomas	Clarke Dickens	230	11	Monroe	Pike County	Upson Co.
Booty, Sarah (Wid)	Warren Huberts	139	6	Monroe		
Borders, Stephen	Jackson Haggards	178	5	Monroe		
Borders, Stephen	Jackson Haggards	83	11	Monroe		
Boshier, George W.	Putnam Bledsoes	80	6	Monroe		
Bostick, Mary (Wid)	Morgan Harris	155	2	Monroe	Pike County	
Bostwick, Littleberry	Chatham Reids	136	9	Monroe	Pike County	
Bostwick, Stephen	Oglethorpe 226	162	12	Monroe		
Bostwick, Stephen C.	Jones Flowers	232	15	Monroe	Pike County	Upson Co.
Boswell, Levi	Putnam Brooks	121	11	Monroe	Lamar Co.	
Boswell, Levi	Putnam Brooks	362	13	Monroe	Bibb Co.	
Bosworth, Richmond	Warren Harris	209	13	Monroe	Bibb Co.	
Boutwell, Elizabeth (Wid)	Pulaski Landis	139	11	Monroe	Pike County	Upson Co.
Bowden, James Sr.	Putnam Tomlinsons 339	339	13	Monroe	Bibb Co.	
Bowen, Dickson	Wilkes Reeves	226	15	Monroe	Pike County	Upson Co.
Bowen, Hughkey (Orps)	Oglethorpe Goldings	4	15	Monroe	Pike County	Upson Co.
Bowen, Levi	Tattnall Johnsons	94	5	Monroe		
Bowen, Sessions	Wilkinson Pierces	242	11	Monroe	Pike County	Upson Co.
Bowles, Benj. B.	Oglethorpe Bowles	162	10	Monroe	Pike County	Upson Co.
Bowles, John J.	Oglethorpe Bowles	117	12	Monroe		
Bowling, Matthew R.	Oglethorpe Goldings	60	6	Monroe		
Bowls, Thomas	Greene Leftwichs	184	5	Monroe		
Bowman, Gilbert	Gwinnett Dobbs	52	9	Monroe	Pike County	
Bowman, Gilbert Jr.	Gwinnett Dobbs	3	9	Monroe	Pike County	
Bowman, Moses	Madison Leepers	236	9	Monroe	Pike County	
Box, Lemmonds	Baldwin Stephens	23	15	Monroe	Pike County	Upson Co.
Boyd, Samuel	Jasper Phillips	254	12	Monroe		
Boyet, Arthur	Pulaski Robinson	90	4	Monroe	Butts Co.	
Boyet, Arthur	Pulaski Robinsons	279	13	Monroe	Bibb Co.	
Boyet, Seth	Scriven Bracks	227	1	Monroe	Pike County	
Boyet, Wm. W.	Jasper Wallis	60	14	Monroe		
Boykin, Flerl	Screven Douglass	175	2	Monroe	Pike County	Spalding Co.
Boyle, John	Jackson Olivers	189	11	Monroe	Pike County	Upson Co.
Boyls, Eliza (Orp)	Telfair Loves	197	2	Monroe	Pike County	Lamar Co.
Boyls, Elizabeth (Orp)	Telfair Loves	197	2	Monroe	Pike County	Lamar Co.
Boyls, Harriet (Orp)	Telfair Loves	197	2	Monroe	Pike County	Lamar Co.
Boyls, Jefferson (Orp)	Telfair Loves	197	2	Monroe	Pike County	Lamar Co.
Boyt, James	Burke Powells	44	9	Monroe	Pike County	
Bracher, Wm. (Orps)	Oglethorpe Goldings	75	11	Monroe	Pike County	Upson Co.
Brack, Richard	Burke McCullers	102	3	Monroe	Pike County	
Bradberry, James	Gwinnett Bridges	95	6	Monroe		
Bradberry, Spencer E.	Madison Griffiths	224	3	Monroe	Lamar Co.	
Bradford, Richard B.	Walton Richs	41	1	Monroe	Pike County	Spalding Co.
Bradley, Jane (Wid)	Putnam Coopers	190	8	Monroe	Pike County	
Bradley, Spears	Hancock Simms	36	3	Monroe	Pike County	
Brady, Nathan Sr.	Jones Phillips	239	8	Monroe	Pike County	
Brady, Sam'l Sr.	Wilkinson Mims	81	4	Monroe		
Bramblet, John	Hall Roberts	167	12	Monroe		
Branch, Armsted	Greene Gregorys	204	2	Monroe	Pike County	Spalding Co.
Branch, David	Laurens McClendns	240	6	Monroe		
Branch, Elias	Montgomery Adams	183	7	Monroe	Lamar Co.	
Branch, James C.	Greene Allens	152	12	Monroe		
Branham, John	Washington Floyds	19	14	Monroe	Butts Co.	
Branham, Michael	Habersham Ritches	244	8	Monroe	Pike County	
Brannen, William	Scriven Burnes	241	9	Monroe	Pike County	
Bransby, Eliza (Orp)	Chatham Rowells	368	13	Monroe	Bibb Co.	379-378?
Brantlet, Lott	Elbert Merritts	43	14	Monroe		
Brantley, Green D.	Jasper Burneys	271	11	Monroe	Pike County	Upson Co.
Brantley, James	Columbia Cochrans	50	7	Monroe	Pike County	Lamar Co.
Brantley, James	Columbia Cochrans	7	11	Monroe		
Brantley, James	Washington Jenkins	30	14	Monroe		
Brantley, Jeptha	Warren Wilders	241	3	Monroe		
Brantley, John H.	Jasper 293	34	6	Monroe		
Brasselton, Reuben	Hall McCutchens	186	12	Monroe		
Braswell, Blansey	Jones Jefferson	96	15	Monroe	Pike County	Upson Co.
Braswell, George	Clarke Sorrells	81	3	Monroe	Pike County	Spalding Co.
Braswell, William	Clarke Sorrels	35	9	Monroe	Pike County	
Braswell, Wilson	Laurens Miltons	67	4	Monroe		
Brawner, Henry P.	Elbert Almonds	276	13	Monroe	Bibb Co.	
Brawner, Joel	Elbert Penns	104	10	Monroe	Pike County	Upson Co.
Bray, George	Putnam Bledsoes	175	8	Monroe	Pike County	
Bray, John	Washington Williams	222	11	Monroe	Pike County	Upson Co.
Brazeal, James	Jasper Shropshires 236	236	2	Monroe	Pike County	Spalding Co.
Brazeal, Valentine	Jackson Flanagans	100	13	Monroe		
Bressie, William	Baldwin Husons	317	13	Monroe	Bibb Co.	
Brewer, Drury	Morgan Shaws	213	7	Monroe	Lamar Co.	
Brewer, Drury	Morgan Shaws	157	12	Monroe		
Brewer, James	Richmond Wares	70	9	Monroe	Pike County	
Brewer, James	Clarke Dickens	70	14	Monroe	Butts Co.	
Brewer, Joseph (Orps)	Efingham 13th	94	1	Monroe	Pike County	Spalding Co.
Brewer, Tilmon M.	Putnam Hendricks	168	3	Monroe	Lamar Co.	
Bridger, Martha (Wid)	Chatham Reeds	121	13	Monroe		
Bridges, Howell	Jasper Pollards	240	7	Monroe	Lamar Co.	
Bridges, John	Gwinnett Bridges	199	2	Monroe	Pike County	Lamar Co.
Bridges, Kellis C.	Oglethorpe 235	44	11	Monroe		
Brigham, John	Burke McRays	121	5	Monroe		
Briscoe, Braziel (Orps)	Putnam Johnsons	26	3	Monroe	Pike County	
Britton, John	Jasper Phillips	31	4	Monroe		
Brock, Thomas	Habersham Townsend	62	13	Monroe		
Brookins, Haywood	Washington Riddles	92	9	Monroe	Pike County	
Brooks, Catharine (Wid)	Warren Harris	19	8	Monroe	Pike County	Lamar Co.
Brooks, David (Orp)	Oglethorpe Goldings	149	6	Monroe		
Brooks, Magnus A.	Jackson Mayes	49	7	Monroe	Pike County	Lamar Co.
Brooks, Martin	Washington Floyds	85	13	Monroe		
Brooks, Moses	Jasper Martins	63	13	Monroe		
Brooks, Sarah	Washington Floyds	298	13	Monroe	Bibb Co.	
Broome, Ezekiel F.	Warren Blunts	137	2	Monroe	Pike County	Spalding Co.
Brotan, Charles (Orp)	Jasper Phillips	108	1	Monroe	Pike County	Spalding Co.
Broten, Nancy (Wid)	Jefferson Smiths	136	5	Monroe		
Broughton, James	Jefferson Flemings	170	11	Monroe	Pike County	Upson Co.
Brower, Isaac	Chatham Mills	109	8	Monroe	Pike County	Lamar Co.
Brown, Abraham	Elbert Merritts	90	8	Monroe	Pike County	
Brown, Asa	Jefferson Dodds	83	12	Monroe		
Brown, Benjamin	Madison Vineyards	119	6	Monroe		
Brown, Collins	Lincoln Anthonys	15	10	Monroe	Pike County	Upson Co.
Brown, Elijah	Clarke Sorrells	181	3	Monroe		
Brown, George L.	Camden Clarke	50	15	Monroe	Pike County	Upson Co.
Brown, Henry	Jefferson Flemmings	23	1	Monroe	Pike County	Spalding Co.
Brown, Henry (Orps)	Washington Williams	50	15	Monroe	Pike County	Upson Co.
Brown, Hezekiah	Laurens Mathers	73	4	Monroe		
Brown, Isaac	Jackson Spruces	22	14	Monroe	Butts Co.	
Brown, James	Pulaski Landis	213	13	Monroe	Bibb Co.	
Brown, James B.	Greene Woodhams	135	11	Monroe	Lamar Co.	
Brown, Jesse D.	Washington Williams	191	6	Monroe		
Brown, John	Twiggs Batemans	92	10	Monroe	Pike County	Upson Co.
Brown, John (Capt)	Chatham Mills	144	11	Monroe	Pike County	Upson Co.
Brown, John Jr.	Jasper Martins	114	13	Monroe		
Brown, John M.	Jackson Spruces	20	14	Monroe	Butts Co.	
Brown, Joseph	Hancock Swints	37	13	Monroe		
Brown, Mark M.	Wilkinson Wiggins	234	15	Monroe	Pike County	Upson Co.
Brown, Martha (Wid)	Jasper Ryans	179	13	Monroe		
Brown, Mary (Wid)	Effingham 10th	87	7	Monroe	Pike County	Lamar Co.
Brown, Nancy (Wid)	Columbia Griffins	164	15	Monroe	Pike County	Upson Co.
Brown, Nathan	Emanuel Lanes	110	5	Monroe		
Brown, Sarah (Orp)	Habersham Taylors	216	13	Monroe		
Brown, Sarah (Wid)	Jasper Dardens	33	1	Monroe	Pike County	Spalding Co.
Brown, Sarah (Wid)	Camden Browns	96	2	Monroe	Pike County	
Brown, Sarah (Wid)	Camden Baileys	21	8	Monroe	Pike County	Lamar Co.
Brown, Thos.	Morgan Patricks	216	8	Monroe	Pike County	
Brown, Walter (Orp)	Clarke Dickens	211	9	Monroe	Pike County	
Brown, William	Jasper Burneys	68	15	Monroe	Pike County	Upson Co.
Brown, William W.	Wilkinson Jordans	262	12	Monroe		
Brown, Wm.	Camden Browns	191	4	Monroe	Butts Co.	
Brownfield, Robert	Jasper Newtons	159	8	Monroe	Pike County	
Browning, Eli B.	Jefferson Fountain	258	13	Monroe		
Browning, Joshua	Bulloch Deloachs	15	14	Monroe	Butts Co.	
Browning, Solomon	Jackson Hansons	271	10	Monroe	Pike County	Upson Co.
Bruce, John	Greene Leftwichs	59	4	Monroe		
Bruce, Nancy	Burke McCullers	210	3	Monroe		
Brumelow, Isbell (Orp)	Gwinnett Davis	188	9	Monroe	Pike County	
Brumelow, William	Gwinnett Pittmons	56	11	Monroe		
Brumloo, Vallintine	Gwinnett Pittmons	182	11	Monroe	Pike County	
Brunson, John (Orps)	Twigs Batemans	185	7	Monroe	Lamar Co.	
Bryan, James (Mud)	Twiggs Batemans	183	15	Monroe	Pike County	Upson Co.
Bryan, Jason	Washington Whitfields	175	15	Monroe	Pike County	Upson Co.
Bryan, Samuel	Scriven Burnes	6	12	Monroe		
Bryan, Thomas Jr.	Franklin Eddens	145	3	Monroe		
Bryant, Isaac	Effingham -	219	3	Monroe	Lamar Co.	
Bryant, James H.	Burke Sapps	160	8	Monroe	Pike County	
Bryant, John	Putnam Johnsons	95	5	Monroe		
Bryant, William	Scriven Burnes	42	9	Monroe	Pike County	
Bryant, Wm.	Oglethorpe 226	24	12	Monroe		
Buchanan, Wm. B.	Jasper Thorntons	93	8	Monroe	Pike County	
Buchannon, Silas B.	Jasper Thorntons	103	11	Monroe	Lamar Co.	
Buckhannon, Robert	Baldwin McGees	180	6	Monroe		
Buckhannon, Thos.	Wilkinson Brooks	229	3	Monroe	Lamar Co.	
Buckholts, Wm.	Warren Williams	36	2	Monroe	Pike County	
Buckley, John	McIntosh Thorpes	269	13	Monroe	Bibb Co.	
Buckner, Benjamin	Jones Jeffersons	40	13	Monroe		
Buckner, Daniel	Putnam Leggets	47	10	Monroe	Pike County	Upson Co.
Buckner, Dan'l Sr.	Wilkes Hillhouse	69	15	Monroe	Pike County	Upson Co.
Buckner, James	Hancock Colemans	250	1	Monroe	Pike County	
Buckner, Wiley	Jones Jeffersons	116	12	Monroe		
Buffington, Joseph	Elbert, Wards	164	2	Monroe	Pike County	
Bugg, Thos. Jefferson	Clarke Deans	204	7	Monroe	Lamar Co.	
Buis, Caswell	Jasper 293	23	12	Monroe		
Buis, Zachariah	Jasper 293	76	13	Monroe		
Bull, John	Chatham Rowels	83	4	Monroe		
Bull, Martha (Wid)	Columbia Wrights	186	3	Monroe		
Bullard, Amos	Burke McCullers	236	8	Monroe	Pike County	
Bullard, Sion R.	Jasper 293	194	8	Monroe	Pike County	
Bullard, Wm. (Orps)	Jasper 293	293	13	Monroe		
Bullock, Mitchell	Hancock, Nelsons	55	8	Monroe	Pike County	Lamar Co.
Bullock, Wm. G.	Madison Leepers	22	6	Monroe		
Burch, Allen	Gwinnett Dobbs	14	14	Monroe	Butts Co.	
Burch, Littleton	Laurens, Stevens	130	1	Monroe	Pike County	
Burch, Sarah (Wid)	Hancock Johnsons	45	13	Monroe		
Burditt, Benjamin	Wilkes, Welborns	57	10	Monroe	Pike County	Upson Co.
Burford, Daniel	Oglethorpe 226	18	11	Monroe		
Burgammy, Wm.	Warren Harris	139	13	Monroe		
Burgess, Mary (Wid)	McIntosh Townsends	182	12	Monroe		
Burk, John	Twiggs McCrarys	218	4	Monroe	Butts Co.	
Burk, John	Twiggs McCrarys	96	5	Monroe		
Burks, Record	Richmond Palmers	38	3	Monroe	Pike County	
Burnes, James	Wilkinson Wiggins	48	8	Monroe	Pike County	Lamar Co.
Burnes, William	Elbert Upshaws	260	9	Monroe	Pike County	
Burnett, Malindia (Orp)	Camden Baileys	125	12	Monroe		
Burns, Ruth (Wid)	Morgan Harris	33	8	Monroe	Pike County	Lamar Co.
Burnsides, Edmund (Orp)	Bryan Smiths	229	2	Monroe	Pike County	Lamar Co.
Burrage, James	Columbia Shaws	39	1	Monroe	Pike County	Spalding Co.
Burrough, James	Walton Rich's	67	11	Monroe	Lamar Co.	
Burroughs, James	Walton Rich's	78	14	Monroe		
Burside, Elenor (Wid)	Columbia Wilsons	185	10	Monroe	Pike County	Upson Co.
Burson, Isaac	Warren Williams	152	9	Monroe	Pike County	
Burton, Isaiah	Richmond Lamars	133	12	Monroe		
Burton, John	Jackson Hansons	66	12	Monroe		
Busbin, David	Oglethorpe 226	61	6	Monroe		
Busby, John	Twiggs Halls	180	9	Monroe	Pike County	
Busby, John	Twiggs Halls	158	13	Monroe		
Busby, Wm. M.	Jefferson Smiths	67	3	Monroe	Pike County	
Bush, James	Early Reids	37	10	Monroe	Pike County	Upson Co.
Bush, John T.	Laurens Deens	213	3	Monroe		
Bush, Samuel	Burke Powells	256	9	Monroe	Pike County	
Bustin, Thomas	Putnam Hendricks	216	4	Monroe	Butts Co.	
Butcher, Thomas	Washington Coaseys	117	4	Monroe	Butts Co.	
Butler, Stephen	Scriven Bests	49	4	Monroe		
Buttrell, Thomas T.	Warren Wilders	79	9	Monroe	Pike County	
Butts, David	Pulaski Yarbrough	70	15	Monroe	Pike County	Upson Co.
Bynam, John	Columbia Bealls	115	15	Monroe	Pike County	Upson Co.
Byrd, John	Emanuel Olivers	247	1	Monroe	Pike County	
Byrd, John Sr.	Hall Roberts	191	12	Monroe		
Byrd, Philip M.	Hall Roberts	94	14	Monroe		
Cadenhead, Ivey	Hancock Mattlocks	81	5	Monroe		
Cail, Abraham	Jones Mullins	197	6	Monroe		
Cain, Magee (Wid)	Hall Wallaces	125	4	Monroe	Butts Co.	
Calahan, James	Jackson Mayes	76	10	Monroe	Pike County	Upson Co.
Calaway, Elisha A.	Twiggs Houses	57	7	Monroe	Pike County	Lamar Co.
Calaway, James	Jasper Phillips	41	15	Monroe	Pike County	Upson Co.
Caldwell, John	Richmond Luthers	31	10	Monroe	Pike County	Upson Co.
Caldwell, John	McIntosh Thorpes	47	14	Monroe		
Caldwell, John	McIntosh Thorpes	186	15	Monroe	Pike County	Upson Co.
Calhoon, Jacob	Laurens Deans	97	10	Monroe	Pike County	Upson Co.
Calhoun, James	Montgomery Adams	130	13	Monroe		
Calhoun, John	Laurens Coats	41	5	Monroe		
Calhoun, Levi	Burke Lodges	188	13	Monroe		
Callahan, Bryant, Jr.	Washington Eckles	210	7	Monroe	Lamar Co.	
Callaway, Joshua S.	Jones Greshams	184	3	Monroe		
Calloway, Mary (Wid)	Wilkes Johnstons	333	13	Monroe	Bibb Co.	
Callum, Elijah	Jasper 293	209	11	Monroe	Pike County	
Camak, James	Baldwin Malcoms	52	2	Monroe	Pike County	Spalding Co.
Campbell, Archibald	Telfair Robertsons	165	15	Monroe	Pike County	Upson Co.
Campbell, Daniel	Jones Burkhlters	37	5	Monroe		
Campbell, Daniel	Jones Burkhalters	261	10	Monroe	Pike County	Upson Co.
Campbell, James A.	Wilkes Coopers	219	8	Monroe	Pike County	
Campbell, James A.	Wilkes Coopers	314	13	Monroe	Bibb Co.	
Campbell, James H.	Morgan Campbells	188	2	Monroe	Pike County	Lamar Co.
Campbell, John	Madison Baughs	179	7	Monroe	Lamar Co.	
Campbell, John	Greene Astins	146	10	Monroe	Pike County	Upson Co.
Campbell, John	Walton Davis	184	1	Monroe	Pike County	Spalding Co.
Campbell, John S.	Richmond Brantleys	245	15	Monroe	Pike County	Upson Co.
Campbell, William	Jones Flowers	133	7	Monroe	Lamar Co.	
Candler, Wm. L.	Baldwin Whites	17	11	Monroe		
Cannedy, John	Gwinnett Dobbs	215	13	Monroe		
Cannon, Archibald	Bullock Deloches	242	2	Monroe	Pike County	Spalding Co.
Cannon, James	Jones Jeffersons	60	4	Monroe		
Cannon, John	Putnam Moreland	46	14	Monroe		
Cape, Thomas Sr.	Franklin Turks	113	12	Monroe		
Capps, Cason	Liberty Bradwells	128	8	Monroe	Pike County	
Capps, Luray (Wid)	Effingham 10	53	4	Monroe		
Capps, Thomas	Chatham Rowells	44	5	Monroe		
Cardin, Benjn.	Jasper Whites	102	7	Monroe	Pike County	Lamar Co.
Cardin, Charles	Twiggs Halls	61	12	Monroe		
Cardwell, Peter	Jones Pitts	256	2	Monroe	Pike County	Lamar Co.
Carey, Rebecca (Wid)	LaurensSwearingens	250	13	Monroe		
Cargil, Thomas Sr.	Gwinnett Tippens	106	10	Monroe	Pike County	Upson Co.
Cargill, Thomas Sr.	Gwinnett Tippens	185	8	Monroe	Pike County	
Carithers, James	Oglethorpe 235	3	1	Monroe	Pike County	Spalding Co.
Carlton, Archibald	Greene Rankins	29	4	Monroe		
Carlton, Elizabeth (Wid)	Oglethorpe 226	207	8	Monroe	Pike County	
Carlton, Henry	Clarke Stewarts	252	1	Monroe	Pike County	
Carmichel, Richd.	Clarke Deans	81	10	Monroe	Pike County	Upson Co.
Carney, Margarett (Orp)	Chatham Mills	155	9	Monroe	Pike County	
Carpenter, Jacob	Tattnall Griders	116	4	Monroe	Butts Co.	
Carr, Hugh	Hall Wallaces	236	10	Monroe	Pike County	Upson Co.
Carr, Joseph (Orps)	Chatham Tebeaus	97	9	Monroe	Pike County	
Carr, Wm. A.	Clarke Browns	163	11	Monroe	Pike County	Upson Co.
Carrell, John W.	Franklin Holsonbacks	179	8	Monroe	Pike County	
Carrol, Isaac	Washington Williams	173	5	Monroe		
Carson, Lydia Ann (Wid)	Chatham Mills	251	9	Monroe	Pike County	
Carsons, William (Orps)	Jones Cabiniss	188	5	Monroe		
Carswell, James B.	Twiggs Tysons	89	1	Monroe	Pike County	Spalding Co.
Carter, Benona	Oglethorpe Ravens	40	2	Monroe	Pike County	
Carter, Benona	Oglethorpe Ravens	222	2	Monroe	Pike County	Lamar Co.
Carter, Frederick	Laurens Deens	18	2	Monroe	Pike County	Spalding Co.
Carter, Reuben	Elbert Tatoms	225	10	Monroe	Pike County	Upson Co.
Cartledge, James Jr.	Columbia Bealls	162	8	Monroe	Pike County	
Carver, Elijah	Appling Cokers	227	5	Monroe		
Cary, Elphiston	Warren Torrences	257	11	Monroe	Pike County	Upson Co.
Cash, Joel F.	Jackson Mayes	237	9	Monroe	Pike County	
Cashon, John	Twiggs Chains	139	2	Monroe	Pike County	Spalding Co.
Cason, Eli	Appling Bryans	236	4	Monroe	Butts Co.	
Cason, James	Wayne Langsters	172	10	Monroe	Pike County	Upson Co.
Cassels, Henry	Walton Wagnons	150	11	Monroe	Pike County	Upson Co.
Castellow, Henry	Chatham De Lyons	226	12	Monroe		
Castleberry, Zachariah	Walton Rich's	10	14	Monroe	Butts Co.	
Casy, Hiram	Walton Williams	184	8	Monroe	Pike County	
Catching, Martha (Wid)	Green Winfields	115	5	Monroe		
Catching, Seymour	Putnam Walkers	137	6	Monroe		
Cater, Hezekiah W.	Richmond Lamars	140	7	Monroe	Lamar Co.	
Catlett, Alsey	Madison Stricklands	88	8	Monroe	Pike County	
Catlin, Joel	Richmond Wares	227	8	Monroe	Pike County	
Cato, William	Wilkes Welborns	247	12	Monroe		
Cato, William P.	Greene Catoes	31	5	Monroe		
Cavinder, George	Jasper Phillips	271	13	Monroe	Bibb Co.	
Cesar, Celia (Wid)	Chatham Raifords	102	12	Monroe		
Chambers, Thos.	Elbert Ruckers	259	9	Monroe	Pike County	
Chambless, Alexander	Jones Phillips	73	7	Monroe	Pike County	Lamar Co.
Chambless, Jesse	Jones Huffs	240	13	Monroe	Bibb Co.	
Champion, William G.	Jones Cabaniss	8	5	Monroe		
Chancelor, William	Washington Morrisons	43	12	Monroe		
Chancey, Saml	Camden Bates	156	11	Monroe	Pike County	Upson Co.
Chancey, Tiner	Appling Boyds	174	12	Monroe		
Chandler, Bailey	Jackson Flanagans	102	8	Monroe	Pike County	
Chandler, Wm. (Orpn)	Warren Jernigans	192	1	Monroe	Pike County	
Chaney, John	Montgomery McElveens	87	8	Monroe	Pike County	
Channel, George	Green Cato's	213	11	Monroe	Pike County	
Channel, William	Hancock Huffs	168	4	Monroe	Butts Co.	
Chaplain, Wm.	Oglethorpe Cardwells	219	15	Monroe	Pike County	Upson Co.
Chapman, John D.	Bapdwin Stephens	73	3	Monroe	Pike County	Spalding Co.
Chapman, Sally (Wid)	Jasper Ryans	95	11	Monroe		
Chapman, William B.	Jones Parmenters	21	7	Monroe	Pike County	Lamar Co.
Chappel, John	Greene Tuckers	9	3	Monroe	Pike County	Spalding Co.
Chatham, James	Franklin Harriss	213	6	Monroe		
Chatham, Robt. W.	Chatham DeLyons	250	15	Monroe	Pike County	Upson Co.
Cheek, William	Elbert Merritts	19	9	Monroe	Pike County	
Cherry, George	Twiggs Houses	181	9	Monroe	Pike County	
Cherry, Rebecca (Wid)	Twiggs Houses	77	15	Monroe	Pike County	Upson Co.
Cherry, Wm. T.	Twiggs Houses	222	6	Monroe		
Cheshire, Robert	Jones Stallings	63	14	Monroe		
Chesser, Doreas (Wid)	Putnam Sanders	39	3	Monroe	Pike County	
Childs, Nathan Jr.	Jones Pitts	151	9	Monroe	Pike County	
Christian, Edwd. L.	Madison Stricklands	157	11	Monroe	Pike County	Upson Co.
Christian, Joannah (Wid)	Madison Stricklands	15	8	Monroe	Pike County	Lamar Co.
Christian, Wm. P.	Elbert Penns	1	6	Chatham		
Christian, Wm. P.	Elbert Penns	156	10	Monroe	Pike County	Upson Co.
Christopher, Sebourn	Greene Mercers	211	2	Monroe	Pike County	Spalding Co.
Chun, Amos	Wilkes	234	1	Monroe	Pike County	
Chun, Amos	Wilkes Mirees	95	15	Monroe	Pike County	Upson Co.
Clabourn, James	Hancock	61	7	Monroe	Pike County	Lamar Co.
Clanton, Turner	Columbia Colliers	120	15	Monroe	Pike County	Upson Co.
Clark, Catharine (Wid)	Chatham Thiess	126	1	Monroe	Pike County	Spalding Co.
Clark, Drewry	Burke Cavenahs	117	2	Monroe	Pike County	Spalding Co.
Clark, Hosea W.	Jones Greshams	45	12	Monroe		
Clark, Isabella (Orp)	Camden Millers	202	6	Monroe		
Clark, John	Richmond Brantleys	157	1	Monroe	Pike County	
Clark, Thomas (Orps)	Greene Greere	119	15	Monroe	Pike County	Upson Co.
Clark, Warren B.	Elbert Ruckers	23	4	Monroe		
Clark, Wm. H. (Orp)	Morgan Shaws	224	4	Monroe	Butts Co.	
Clarke, David	Richmond Brantleys	237	3	Monroe		
Clarke, John (Gov)	Baldwin McCrareys	29	15	Monroe	Pike County	Upson Co.
Clarkson, David	Franklin Ramseys	249	10	Monroe	Pike County	Upson Co.
Clay, Lewis	Wilkinson Williams	229	7	Monroe	Lamar Co.	
Clem, Henry	Putnam Johnsons	140	9	Monroe	Pike County	
Clements, Peyton	Putnam Johnsons	58	4	Monroe		
Clements, Stephen	Baldwin Doles	29	6	Monroe		
Clements, Stephen	Baldwin Doles	103	7	Monroe	Lamar Co.	
Cleveland, Albert J. (Minor)	Habersham McCrarys	1	2	Monroe	Pike County	
Cliett, Isaac Jr.	Columbia Colliers	284	13	Monroe	Bibb Co.	
Clifton, Achibald	Liberty Frasiers	40	9	Monroe	Pike County	
Clopton, Alford	Putnam Leggetts	15	2	Monroe	Pike County	Spalding Co.
Coab, Mary (Wid)	Early Hair's	78	9	Monroe	Pike County	
Coal, John	Glynn Dyers	31	15	Monroe	Pike County	Upson Co.
Coal, Simon	Glynn Dyers	97	6	Monroe		
Coats, Martha J. (Orp/Wm)	Wilkes Reeve	242	13	Monroe	Bibb Co.	
Cobb, Edward Jr.	Pulaski Regans	248	12	Monroe		
Cobb, Edward Sr.	Pulaski Regans	288	13	Monroe		
Cobb, Elizabeth (Wid)	Jones Haws	3	5	Monroe		
Cobb, Jacob	Baldwin Stephens	196	7	Monroe	Lamar Co.	
Cobb, Thomas W.	Oglethorpe Cardwells	227	3	Monroe	Lamar Co.	
Cobb, Wm. (Orps)	Columbia Fews	157	4	Monroe	Butts Co.	
Cochran, Parmsuas (Orps)	Wilkes Freemans	45	11	Monroe		
Cochron, Elizabeth (Wid	Wilkes Moores	6	9	Monroe	Pike County	
Cock, McKinney	Burke Lodges	139	5	Monroe		
Cockrane, Robert	Franklin Turks	84	14	Monroe	Butts Co.	
Cockrum, John	Jones Phillips	111	2	Monroe	Pike County	Spalding Co.
Cocks, Rachel	Washington Robisons	179	4	Monroe	Butts Co.	
Cody, Rich (Orps)	Warren Torrances	103	10	Monroe	Pike County	Upson Co.
Cogburn, Sirus	Washington Coaseys	135	15	Monroe	Pike County	Upson Co.
Coggin, Joshua	Morgan Whitakers	10	2	Monroe	Pike County	Spalding Co.
Cohron, Feelas G.	Walton Kobbs	68	11	Monroe	Lamar Co.	
Coker, Francis Sr.	Telfair Edwards	1	3	Monroe	Pike County	
Coker, James	Jackson Fulcjers	159	11	Monroe	Pike County	Upson Co.
Coker, Larkin	Franklin Cokers	51	12	Monroe		
Colbert, John	Oglethorpe 235	168	5	Monroe		
Colcloughly, Alexr.	Greene Nelms	212	6	Monroe		
Cole, Mark	Columbia Grifins	21	2	Monroe	Pike County	Spalding Co.
Coleman, Abner	Gwinnett Davis	102	10	Monroe	Pike County	Upson Co.
Coleman, Archibald	Morgan Wagnons	143	4	Monroe	Butts Co.	
Coleman, Isaac	Burke Lodges	281	9	Monroe	Pike County	
Coleman, James	Putnam Bruckners	194	9	Monroe	Pike County	
Coleman, John	Greene Schotts	255	8	Monroe	Pike County	
Coleman, John	Jefferson Dodds	57	9	Monroe	Pike County	
Coleman, John	Pulaski Yarbroughs	154	9	Monroe	Pike County	
Coleman, Moses	Appling Boyds	160	12	Monroe		
Coleman, Wright R.	Laurens Mathers	43	10	Monroe	Pike County	Upson Co.
Coleson, Benjamin M.	Tattnall Durrences	204	1	Monroe	Pike County	
Colley, Zacharias	Madison Griffins	143	12	Monroe		
Collins, Andrew	Wilkinson Brooks	327	13	Monroe	Bibb Co.	
Collins, Aron	Baldwin Doles	48	4	Monroe		
Collins, Baxter S.	Oglethorpe Thorntons	110	8	Monroe	Pike County	Lamar Co.
Collins, Charles	Hall McCutchens	52	4	Monroe		
Collins, David	Baldwin McGhees	99	10	Monroe	Pike County	Upson Co.
Collins, Hardy	Tattnall McInnis	252	9	Monroe	Pike County	
Collins, Henry	Jackson Mayes	128	13	Monroe		
Collins, John	Richmond Winters	46	12	Monroe		
Collins, John M.	Chatham Mills	164	1	Monroe	Pike County	
Collins, Joseph	Twiggs Houses	90	15	Monroe	Pike County	Upson Co.
Collins, Lewis	Twiggs Houses	219	4	Monroe	Butts Co.	
Collins, Peter H.	Columbia Fews	174	7	Monroe	Lamar Co.	
Collins, William	Oglethorpe Thorntons	114	12	Monroe		
Collins, Wilson	Jasper Whites	117	3	Monroe	Pike County	Spalding Co.
Colquitt, Walter T.	Walton Wests	23	7	Monroe	Pike County	Lamar Co.
Colson, Dennis	Screven Conners	172	4	Monroe	Butts Co.	
Colvard, Thomas	Columbia Shaws	29	14	Monroe		
Colyer, Henry	Wilkinson Lees	125	11	Monroe	Lamar Co.	
Combs, Bud	Jasper Barnes	18	10	Monroe	Pike County	Upson Co.
Combs, John	Camden Bates	67	14	Monroe	Butts Co.	
Cone, James	Appling Newmans	34	3	Monroe	Pike County	
Cone, James	Bulloch Denmarks	200	6	Monroe		
Cone, William Jr.	Richmond Palmer	7	12	Monroe		
Coney, Joel	Laurens Stevens	221	15	Monroe	Pike County	Upson Co.
Conger, Eli	Jasper Martins	105	6	Monroe		
Conn, William	Gwinnett Pittmans	13	12	Monroe		
Connell, Thomas	Jefferson Connells	18	7	Monroe	Pike County	Lamar Co.
Connelly, Wm. H. (Orp)	Jefferson Woldens	128	5	Monroe		
Conner, John Shehee	Lincoln Parkers	8	2	Monroe	Pike County	
Conner, Wilson	Tattnall Durrences	148	3	Monroe		
Coody, Clayton	Jasper Ryans	35	8	Monroe	Pike County	Lamar Co.
Cook, Allen	Washington Coaseys	183	2	Monroe	Pike County	Spalding Co.
Cook, Archibald	Franklin Harris	60	13	Monroe		
Cook, Eliz. (Orp/Jonathan)	Jackson Scotts	87	4	Monroe		
Cook, James (Orps)	Washington Morrisons	64	9	Monroe	Pike County	
Cook, James N.	Jackson Spruces	140	15	Monroe	Pike County	Upson Co.
Cook, Nathaniel	Elbert Oliver	39	5	Monroe		
Cook, Nathaniel	Elbert Oliver	99	12	Monroe		
Cook, Phillip	Baldwin Hussons	51	6	Monroe		
Cook, Thomas	Elbert Olivers	230	1	Monroe	Pike County	
Cook, Zadock	Clark McKelroys	223	4	Monroe	Butts Co.	
Cooksey, Thomas	Wilkes Moores	143	9	Monroe	Pike County	
Cooly, Stephen	Jones Mullins	91	4	Monroe	Butts Co.	
Coon, James	Baldwin Doziers	69	7	Monroe	Pike County	Lamar Co.
Cooper, Bennet	Putnam Johnsons	100	9	Monroe	Pike County	
Cooper, Eli	Laurens Mathers	63	4	Monroe		
Cooper, Elina (Orp)	Bryan Smiths	182	15	Monroe	Pike County	Upson Co.
Cooper, Isaac	Twiggs Chains	212	10	Monroe	Pike County	Upson Co.
Cooper, Joel	Columbia Wrights	105	11	Monroe	Lamar Co.	
Cooper, John	Chatham	70	5	Monroe		
Cooper, Jonathan	Madison Stricklands	27	7	Monroe	Pike County	Lamar Co.
Cooper, Joseph	Burke Lodges	110	4	Monroe	Butts Co.	
Cooper, Joseph (Orps)	Emanuel Parkers	214	10	Monroe	Pike County	Upson Co.
Corlee, Curtis	Gwinnett Dobbs	253	9	Monroe	Pike County	
Corlew, Silas M.	Greene Scotts	101	8	Monroe	Pike County	
Corley, Nancy (Wid)	Putnam Tomlinsons	225	2	Monroe	Pike County	Lamar Co.
Corley, Zachariah	Walton Wagnons	228	2	Monroe	Pike County	Lamar Co.
Cornwell, Hiram	Jasper Martins	262	11	Monroe	Pike County	Upson Co.
Corran, John	Chatham Thiess	132	7	Monroe	Lamar Co.	
Corry, Alexander	Morgan Patricks	90	14	Monroe	Butts Co.	
Cossey, Absalom	Wayne Jacobs	47	1	Monroe	Pike County	Spalding Co.
Cotter, John V.	Hall Cotters	34	5	Monroe		
Cottle, James	Jones Huffs	146	6	Monroe		
Cotton, Peter	Jackson Knoxs	365	13	Monroe	Bibb Co.	
Couch, Isaac	Franklin Cokers	53	10	Monroe	Pike County	Upson Co.
Couch, William	Jasper Whites	121	9	Monroe	Pike County	
Coughran, Hugh E.	Screven Conners	176	6	Monroe		
Coughran, John	Screven Conners	159	4	Monroe	Butts Co.	
Couper, Abner	Greene Winfields	42	3	Monroe	Pike County	Spalding Co.
Couper, James	Jasper Dardens	222	10	Monroe	Pike County	Upson Co.
Cousins, Wm.	Columbia Colliers	79	11	Monroe		
Coward, Zachariah	Twiggs Thames	195	12	Monroe		
Cowart, John W.	Jefferson Dodds	98	10	Monroe	Pike County	Upson Co.
Cowen, Mary (Wid)	Hancock Giblerts	231	1	Monroe	Pike County	
Cowley, Philomon	Wilkinson Kittles	189	7	Monroe	Lamar Co.	
Cox, Aaron B.	Wilkinson Pierces	206	11	Monroe	Pike County	
Cox, Asa	Burke Burkes	235	6	Monroe		
Cox, John	Hall Wallaces	85	3	Monroe	Pike County	Spalding Co.
Cox, Martix (Orpns)	Warren Jones	231	4	Monroe	Butts Co.	
Cox, William	Wilkes Coopers	142	10	Monroe	Pike County	Upson Co.
Coxon, Levy W.	Hancock Mattlocks	97	1	Monroe	Pike County	Spalding Co.
Cozins, Frances (Orp)	Jackson Hansans	97	13	Monroe		
Crabtree, John	Columbia Cochrans	109	10	Monroe	Pike County	Upson Co.
Crabtree, Noah	Wiljkes Thrmonds	12	1	Monroe	Pike County	Spalding Co.
Crane, Benjamin	McIntosh Holzendorfs	47	12	Monroe		
Crawford, Charles	Morgan Wagons	102	6	Monroe		
Crawford, Elisha	Habersham Flanagans	10	5	Monroe		
Crawford, Elisha G.	Jasper Thorntons	45	2	Monroe	Pike County	Spalding Co.
Crawford, Hinton	Morgan Campbells	162	15	Monroe	Pike County	Upson Co.
Crawford, John	Screven Bests	19	6	Monroe		
Crawford, Joseph	Oglethorpe 226th	177	10	Monroe	Pike County	Upson Co.
Crawford, Lucy (Wid)	Elbert Wards	200	4	Monroe	Butts Co.	
Crawford, Martha (Wid)	Putnam Buckners	193	9	Monroe	Pike County	
Crawford, Moses	Jefferson Whighams	216	1	Monroe	Pike County	
Crawford, William	Lincoln Graves	159	6	Monroe		
Crawford, William W.	Gwinnett Bridges	159	2	Monroe	Pike County	
Creamer Benj.	Appling Newmans	21	15	Monroe	Pike County	Upson Co.
Creel, William	Jasper Johns	213	12	Monroe		
Crenshaw, Miles (Orps)	Wilkes Bryants	23	14	Monroe	Butts Co.	
Crews, Ann (Wid)	Effingham 9	11	4	Monroe		
Crews, Stephen	Camden Bates	133	1	Monroe	Pike County	
Criag, Henry (Pilot)	Chatham Mills	49	6	Monroe		
Criddille, William	Green Catos	190	6	Monroe		
Cridinton, William	Walton Gilders	191	10	Monroe	Pike County	Upson Co.
Crittendons, Wm. (Orps)	Columbia Colliers	21	11	Monroe		
Crockett, Joseph	Jasper Burneys	95	8	Monroe	Pike County	
Crommett, Jeremiah	Chatham ---	245	13	Monroe	Bibb Co.	
Crook, Moriah (Orp)	Oglethorpe Huffs	60	2	Monroe	Pike County	
Crosby, Hesikiah	Chatham Scotts	182	2	Monroe	Pike County	Spalding Co.
Crosby, Thos. C.	Camden Bates	203	1	Monroe	Pike County	
Crosby, Thos. C.	Camden Bates	194	5	Monroe		
Crouch, James	Jasper Barnes	217	11	Monroe	Pike County	
Crowley, Sarah (Wid)	Oglethorpe Cardwells	65	8	Monroe	Pike County	Lamar Co.
Cruse, Richard	Jackson Spruces	178	15	Monroe	Pike County	Upson Co.
Cruthers, Andrew	Jones Stallings	119	8	Monroe	Pike County	
Cruthers, Robert	Burke Seegars	54	2	Monroe	Pike County	Spalding Co.
Culbraith, Arch.	Emanuel Chasons	149	12	Monroe		
Culpepper, Joel	Morgan Talbots	12	7	Monroe	Pike County	Lamar Co.
Cumming, Benj.	Oglethorpe Cardwells	87	2	Monroe	Pike County	Spalding Co.
Cunning, Margaret (Wid)	Jefferson Smiths	7	2	Monroe	Pike County	
Cunningham, Ellender (Wid)	Jackson Olivers	120	8	Monroe	Pike County	
Cunningham, George	Jasper Johns	94	3	Monroe	Pike County	
Cunningham, Jas. (Orp)	Jackson Olivers	61	2	Monroe	Pike County	
Cunningham, Joseph B.	Jasper Johns	166	9	Monroe	Pike County	
Curenton, Henry	Madison Stricklands	29	3	Monroe	Pike County	
Cureton, John	Hancock Masons	275	13	Monroe	Bibb Co.	
Curlee, John (Orps)	Gwinnett Davis	32	7	Monroe	Pike County	Lamar Co.
Curry, George	Washington Currys	228	6	Monroe		
Curry, Jabez	Twiggs Bozemans	112	13	Monroe		
Curry, John (S/James)	Greene Greers	178	9	Monroe	Pike County	
Cushing, Isaac F.	Baldwin Malcolms	75	4	Monroe		
Cushing, James	Twiggs Bozemans	21	10	Monroe	Pike County	Upson Co.
Cutts, Elijah Jr.	Washington Eckles	54	10	Monroe	Pike County	Upson Co.
Cutts, Jeremiah	Pulaski Robisons	174	11	Monroe	Pike County	Upson Co.
Cuyler, Richd. R.	Chatham Mills	257	15	Monroe	Pike County	Upson Co.
Dabney, John T.	Jasper Ryans	111	3	Monroe	Pike County	Spalding Co.
Daily, John	Effingham 10th Dist.	100	10	Monroe	Pike County	Upson Co.
Dalton, Mary (Wid)	Richmond Burtons	280	9	Monroe	Pike County	
Danforth, William	Habersham Suttons	45	3	Monroe	Pike County	Spalding Co.
Daniel, Amos (Orps)	Putnam Cowles	172	12	Monroe		
Daniel, Benjamin	Pulaski Robisons	214	4	Monroe	Butts Co.	
Daniel, Beverly	Jasper White	181	12	Monroe		
Daniel, Elizabeth (Wid)	Pulaski Yarbrough	141	12	Monroe		
Daniel, Enoch	Liberty Frasers	66	7	Monroe	Pike County	Lamar Co.
Daniel, Frederick	Jones Cabaniss	225	8	Monroe	Pike County	
Daniel, Henry A.	Wilkes Bryants	222	3	Monroe	Lamar Co.	
Daniel, Lucy (Wid)	Laurens Mathers	60	12	Monroe		
Daniel, Masters	Clark Harpers	58	8	Monroe	Pike County	Lamar Co.
Daniel, Thomas	Walton Wests	177	7	Monroe	Lamar Co.	
Daniel, Thomas	Jasper 365 Dist.	194	10	Monroe	Pike County	Upson Co.
Daniel, William	Baldwin McGees	167	15	Monroe	Pike County	Upson Co.
Danielly, Mark D.	Warren Jones	255	6	Monroe		
Dannelly, Thomas	Putnam Brooks	132	10	Monroe	Pike County	Upson Co.
Darden, Jethro Sr.	Warren Wilders	64	6	Monroe		
Darden, Jethro Sr.	Warren Wilders	252	6	Monroe		
Darden, Moses Jr.	Warren Torrences	68	4	Monroe		
Darden, Moses Sr.	Warren Torrences	231	7	Monroe	Lamar Co.	
Dardin, Wm. Sr.	Warren Torences	91	1	Monroe	Pike County	Spalding Co.
Dardon, Davis	Warren Wilders	156	3	Monroe	Lamar Co.	
Davidson, John	Jones Burkhalters	114	11	Monroe	Lamar Co.	
Davidson, Joseph	Jasper Pollards	156	6	Monroe		
Davidson, Lamuel	Jones Flowers	77	7	Monroe	Pike County	Lamar Co.
Davidson, Thomas	Jasper Wallis	248	13	Monroe	Bibb Co.	
Davis, Charles	Liberty Mills	127	15	Monroe	Pike County	Upson Co.
Davis, Early	Montgomery Colquhouns	158	15	Monroe	Pike County	Upson Co.
Davis, Edmond	Washington Coaseys	250	3	Monroe	Lamar Co.	
Davis, Elijah	Franklin Burtons	356	13	Monroe	Bibb Co.	
Davis, Francis	Warren Hutchinson	58	10	Monroe	Pike County	Upson Co.
Davis, George B.	Jasper Dardens	4	3	Monroe	Pike County	
Davis, Hiram	Wilkinson Williams	6	5	Monroe		
Davis, Jacob	Tattnall Durrences	198	12	Monroe		
Davis, James G.	Wilkinson Jordans	149	7	Monroe	Lamar Co.	
Davis, Jehue	Hancock Clayton	119	12	Monroe		
Davis, John	Elbert Dobbs	80	15	Monroe	Pike County	Upson Co.
Davis, John F.	Wilkinson Jordans	172	3	Monroe		
Davis, John M.	Jones Parometers	3	15	Monroe	Pike County	Upson Co.
Davis, Joseph (Orps)	Chatham Theiss	200	15	Monroe	Pike County	Upson Co.
Davis, Joshua	Wilkes Johnsons	67	15	Monroe	Pike County	Upson Co.
Davis, Julius	Early Hairs	217	8	Monroe	Pike County	
Davis, Lion	Appling Cokers	112	10	Monroe	Pike County	Upson Co.
Davis, Margarett (Wid)	Warren Wilders	58	9	Monroe	Pike County	
Davis, Richard	Elbert Wards	240	8	Monroe	Pike County	
Davis, Richard W.	Washington Coaseys	105	5	Monroe		
Davis, Sebourn	Oglethorpe Thorntons	237	13	Monroe	Bibb Co.	
Davis, Warren	Franklin S. Harris	43	8	Monroe	Pike County	Lamar Co.
Davis, William	Greene Greers	89	3	Monroe	Pike County	
Davis, William	Twiggs Blackshear	172	8	Monroe	Pike County	
Davis, William	Morgan Shephards	354	13	Monroe	Bibb Co.	
Davise, Martha (Wid)	Jasper Whites	219	10	Monroe	Pike County	Upson Co.
Dawning, Thomas	Greene Astins	47	5	Monroe		
Dawson, Wm. W. (Orps)	Twiggs Thames	114	7	Monroe	Pike County	Lamar Co.
Day, Rebecca (Wid)	Putnam Johnsons	141	10	Monroe	Pike County	Upson Co.
Day, William	Walton Kolbs	112	7	Monroe	Pike County	Lamar Co.
Day, William	Gwinnett Penleys	96	10	Monroe	Pike County	Upson Co.
Deadwyler, Martin	Elbert Christians	122	10	Monroe	Pike County	Upson Co.
Dean, John	Jones Huffs	82	6	Monroe		
Dean, John	Laurens Stevens	160	13	Monroe		
Dean, Robert	Jasper John	187	13	Monroe		
Dean, Silas	Pulaski Laniars	162	2	Monroe	Pike County	
Dearing, Asa	Wilkes Josseys	233	15	Monroe	Pike County	Upson Co.
Decker, George (Orp)	Wilkes Millhouses	224	8	Monroe	Pike County	
Dees, Bryant	Pulaski McPhails	143	7	Monroe	Lamar Co.	
Dees, James	Wilkinson Kettles	140	3	Monroe		
Dees, Joel	Wilkinson Kettles	92	1	Monroe	Pike County	Spalding Co.
Dees, William	Tattnall Padgets	32	3	Monroe	Pike County	
Delk, Elisha	Wilkinson Lees	89	8	Monroe	Pike County	
Dell, John	Bulloch Williams	162	4	Monroe	Butts Co.	
Deloach, John (Orps)	Greene Jordans	12	10	Monroe	Pike County	Upson Co.
Deloach, Joseph	Jones Flowers	61	3	Monroe	Pike County	
DeLyon, Abraham J.	Chatham DeLyons	30	1	Monroe	Pike County	Spalding Co.
DeLyon, Levy L.	Chatham Mills	51	9	Monroe	Pike County	
Deney, Robert	Elbert Hannas	153	7	Monroe	Lamar Co.	
Deney, Robert	Elbert Hannas	108	8	Monroe	Pike County	Lamar Co.
Denham, Augustus (Orp)	Richmond Palmers	204	5	Monroe		
Denham, Charles G. (Orp)	Richmond Palmers	204	5	Monroe		
Denham, Emely (Orp)	Richmond Palmers	204	5	Monroe		
Dennard, Kennady C.	Twiggs McCrarys	170	9	Monroe	Pike County	
Dennard, Shadrack	Twiggs McCarys	97	15	Monroe	Pike County	Upson Co.
Dennard, Thomas Sr.	Twiggs McCrarys	72	7	Monroe	Pike County	Lamar Co.
Dennard, Thomas Sr.	Twiggs McCrarys	10	10	Monroe	Pike County	Upson Co.
Dennis, John Jr.	Hancock Daniels	240	3	Monroe		
Dennis, Samuel	Lincoln Parkes	83	3	Monroe	Pike County	Spalding Co.
Dennis, William (Orps)	Lincoln Parkes	75	8	Monroe	Pike County	Lamar Co.
Denson, John E.	Hancock Gilberts	221	10	Monroe	Pike County	Upson Co.
Denson, John N.	Hancock Gilberts	34	9	Monroe	Pike County	
Denton, James	Oglethorpe Ravens	127	6	Monroe		
Denton, James	Oglethorpe Ravens	223	15	Monroe	Pike County	Upson Co.
Depass, Joseph	Chatham Thiess	113	4	Monroe	Butts Co.	
Derrick, John	Chatham Raifords	153	15	Monroe	Pike County	Upson Co.
Desharjo, Robert	Twiggs Chain	124	3	Monroe	Pike County	
Deshon, Daniel	Chatham Thiess	161	15	Monroe	Pike County	Upson Co.
Dial, Martin	Walton Echols	242	3	Monroe		
Dibose, Eugene	Early Hairs	26	10	Monroe	Pike County	Upson Co.
Dicker, Josiah (Orps)	Bryan Smiths	83	2	Monroe	Pike County	Spalding Co.
Dicks, John	Liberty McCranies	205	1	Monroe	Pike County	
Dickson, John	Hancockl Kendalls	45	1	Monroe	Pike County	Spalding Co.
Dickson, Joseph	Burke Turners	285	13	Monroe	Bibb Co.	
Dickson, Robert	Greene Johnsons	159	1	Monroe	Pike County	
Dickson, Robert	Burke Roberts	37	2	Monroe	Pike County	
Dickson, Thomas (Orps)	Clarke Browns	245	7	Monroe	Lamar Co.	
Dillard, Arthur	Jones Phillips	170	5	Monroe		
Dillion, Wm. C.	Richmond Lamars	124	10	Monroe	Pike County	Upson Co.
Dinevent, Daniel	Baldwin	10	13	Monroe		
Disharoon, Isaac	Habersham Flanagans	212	4	Monroe	Butts Co.	
Dismukes, John F.	Putnam Mehones	126	7	Monroe	Pike County	
Dismukes, William	Jones Haws	191	13	Monroe		
Dixon, Bryant	Putnam Cowles	231	13	Monroe	Bibb Co.	
Dixon, Guin	Warren Travis	1	10	Monroe	Pike County	Upson Co.
Dixon, John (Orps)	Powells	161	3	Monroe	Lamar Co.	
Dixon, Robert	Washington Williams	152	15	Monroe	Pike County	Upson Co.
Dobbs, John	Gwinnett Pittmons	106	5	Monroe		
Dodson, Joshua	Jasper Thorntons	170	15	Monroe	Pike County	Upson Co.
Dodson, Richd.	Chatham Reids	253	7	Monroe	Lamar Co.	
Dodson, Samuel	Jasper thornton	216	6	Monroe		
Doles, John	Baldwin Doles	118	15	Monroe	Pike County	Upson Co.
Donaldson, Geo. R.	Screven Conners	131	12	Monroe		
Donaldson, John	Emanuel Dekles	211	11	Monroe	Pike County	
Donaldson, John	Jefferson Fountains	138	13	Monroe	Bibb Co.	
Donaldson, Wm. (Orps)	Screven Conners	230	4	Monroe	Butts Co.	
Dooly, James	Habersham Words	126	9	Monroe	Pike County	
Dopson, Andrew	Twiggs Houses	124	9	Monroe	Pike County	
Dorough, James	Wilkes Freemans	28	11	Monroe	Lamar Co.	
Dortch, David	Washington Wimberlys	62	15	Monroe	Pike County	Upson Co.
Dossett, William	Richmond Burtons	243	7	Monroe	Lamar Co.	
Dossette, Thomas	Hall Brooks	44	2	Monroe	Pike County	Spalding Co.
Doughtry, William	ScrevenBracks	51	8	Monroe	Pike County	Lamar Co.
Douglass, Martha (Wid)	Wilkes Barkesdales	163	10	Monroe	Pike County	Upson Co.
Douglass, Seaborn	Emanuel Jordans	83	5	Monroe		
Dowdy, Ballam	Hall Abercrombie	218	11	Monroe	Pike County	
Dowdy, Benj. (Orp)	Screven Douglass	105	2	Monroe	Pike County	Spalding Co.
Dowdy, Rebecca (Wid)	Screven Douglass	46	9	Monroe	Pike County	
Dowdy, William	Hall McCutchens	44	4	Monroe		
Downes, Watson	Oglethorpe Thorntons	201	13	Monroe	Bibb Co.	
Downs, John Sr.	Clark McKelroys	94	7	Monroe	Pike County	Lamar Co.
Downs, Shadrack	Walton Echols	189	15	Monroe	Pike County	Upson Co.
Downs, Silas	Jones Mullin	214	12	Monroe		
Dowsing, Elizabeth (Wid)	Lincoln Parkes	151	11	Monroe	Pike County	Upson Co.
Dozier, John W.	Columbia Wrights	35	2	Monroe	Pike County	
Dozier, Seaborn	Wilkes Willis	207	10	Monroe	Pike County	Upson Co.
Dregors, John M.	Liberty Frasers	173	12	Monroe		
Dregors, Mathew	Liberty Frasers	5	8	Monroe	Pike County	Lamar Co.
Drew, Jeremiah	Emanuel Prices	22	7	Monroe	Pike County	Lamar Co.
Drew, Mary (Wid)	Emanuel Prices	120	11	Monroe	Lamar Co.	
Drewry, John	Hancock Mattocks	145	9	Monroe	Pike County	
Driskel, George	Jackson Knoxs	65	14	Monroe	Butts Co.	
Driskill, Christopher	Jasper Dardens	265	10	Monroe	Pike County	Upson Co.
Duberry, John	Jasper Ryans	160	6	Monroe		
Duckworth, Joseph	Jones Cabaniss	35	10	Monroe	Pike County	Upson Co.
Dudley, George	Screven Burnes	297	13	Monroe	Bibb Co.	
Dudley, George W. (Orps)	Greene Gregorys	13	11	Monroe		
Dudley, Kinchen C.	Jones Paramenters	142	11	Monroe	Pike County	Upson Co.
Duffy, Thomas	Chatham Thiess	182	10	Monroe	Pike County	Upson Co.
Dugas, Adrain (Orps)	Richmond Brantleys	213	4	Monroe	Butts Co.	
Dugas, Frederick	Richmond Brantleys	203	12	Monroe		
Duggan, John Sr.	Washington Coaseys	87	12	Monroe		
Duke, Ann (Wid)	Chatham Raifords	26	7	Monroe	Pike County	Lamar Co.
Duke, Edward L.	Putnam Morelands	162	9	Monroe	Pike County	
Duke, Hardway (Orps)	Morgan Wagnons	39	8	Monroe	Pike County	Lamar Co.
Duke, Joel	Burke Scarbroughs	85	9	Monroe	Pike County	
Dunaway, Joshua	Warren Williams	265	12	Monroe		
Duncan, Robert	Wilkinson Brooks	16	6	Monroe		
Duncan, Robert	Franklin Duncans	193	12	Monroe		
Dunford, Idison	Burke Scarbrough	254	11	Monroe	Pike County	Upson Co.
Dunford, Jesse (Orps)	Burke Scarbrough	43	5	Monroe		
Dunham, Charles	Chatham Mills	131	11	Monroe	Lamar Co.	
Duniphant, Burwell	Wilkes Welborn	30	15	Monroe	Pike County	Upson Co.
Dunn, Dudley (Dr)	Oglethorpe Cardwells	67	5	Monroe		
Dunn, Nahtaniel (Orps)	Jones Permenters	144	8	Monroe	Pike County	
Dunning, Sheldon C.	Chatham Raifords	131	4	Monroe	Butts Co.	
Dupree, Arthur	Twiggs Halls	9	1	Monroe	Pike County	Spalding Co.
Dupree, Daniel Jr.	Oglethorpe 226 Dist.	68	2	Monroe	Pike County	
Dupree, Drury (Orps)	Clarke Davis	73	9	Monroe	Pike County	
Dupree, Timothy R.	Washington Williams	122	7	Monroe	Pike County	Lamar Co.
Durham, Henry (Orps)	Green Leftwichs	54	13	Monroe		
Durkee, Augustus Fredk.	Chatham Tebeaus	139	8	Monroe	Pike County	
Durouzeaux, Michael	Jefferson Halls	181	1	Monroe	Pike County	
Dutton, James	Elbert Smiths	183	12	Monroe		
Dyer, Edmund (Orp)	Liberty Bradwells	30	7	Monroe	Pike County	Lamar Co.
Dyer, Elizabeth (Orp)	Liberty Bradwells	30	7	Monroe	Pike County	Lamar Co.
Dyer, Mary (Wid)	Greene Winfields	113	15	Monroe	Pike County	Upson Co.
Dyers, John (Orps)	Morgan Wagnons	51	3	Monroe	Pike County	Spalding Co.
Dykes, Elias	Pulaski Robisons	211	5	Monroe		
Dykes, Jordan	Pulaski Robisons	95	3	Monroe	Pike County	
Dykes, Mary (Wid)	Pulaski Robisons	200	13	Monroe	Bibb Co.	
Eady, John	Columbia Colliers	12	13	Monroe		
Earnest, John (Orp)	Jefferson Woldens	221	3	Monroe	Lamar Co.	
Earnest, Thomas T.	Clarke Dickens	14	2	Monroe	Pike County	Spalding Co.
Eason, John	Oglethorpe Bells	224	1	Monroe	Pike County	
Eason, Sophia (Wid)	Putnam Buckners	42	2	Monroe	Pike County	Spalding Co.
Easterling, Bennet	Wilkinson Lees	88	4	Monroe		
Easterwood, Daniel	Jasper Barnes	18	4	Monroe		
Eberhart, Adam	Oglethorpe 235	241	11	Monroe	Pike County	Upson Co.
Echols, Jabel (Minor)	Habersham Taylors	221	11	Monroe	Pike County	
Echols, James	Habersham Taylors	95	13	Monroe		
Echols, Samuel B.	Columbia Clietts	79	13	Monroe		
Eckles, Edward Jr.	Wilkes Reeves	2	3	Monroe	Pike County	
Edgerton, William	Franklin Turks	18	12	Monroe		
Edmondson, H.	Jasper Dardens	350	13	Monroe	Bibb Co.	
Edmondson, Wm. G.	Warren Williams	86	15	Monroe	Pike County	Upson Co.
Edwards, Abel	Franklin Seals	194	6	Monroe		
Edwards, Jehu	Columbia Wrights	247	2	Monroe	Pike County	Spalding Co.
Edwards, John	Putnam Coopers	148	13	Monroe		
Edwards, John	Telfair Edwards	195	3	Monroe	Lamar Co.	
Edwards, John	Elbert Christians	114	5	Monroe		
Edwards, John	Oglethorpe Goldings	53	9	Monroe	Pike County	
Edwards, Shiloah	Telfair Edwards	103	4	Monroe	Butts Co.	
Edwards, William	Franklin Harris	263	10	Monroe	Pike County	Upson Co.
Edwards, Wilson	Twiggs Batemans	77	13	Monroe		
Eidson, James	Wilkes Harris	217	15	Monroe	Pike County	Upson Co.
Eidson, John (Orps)	Wilkes Coopers	147	11	Monroe	Pike County	Upson Co.
Eigleburger, Eliz. (Orp)	Glynn Manning	220	4	Monroe	Butts Co.	
Eley, John W.	Hancock Simms	126	10	Monroe	Pike County	Upson Co.
Elkins, Thomas	Effingham 10 Dist.	152	7	Monroe	Lamar Co.	
Elliby, Edmond (Orps)	Burke Rayes	193	3	Monroe	Lamar Co.	
Ellington, David	Wilkes Bryant	176	2	Monroe	Pike County	Spalding Co.
Ellington, Washington	Hall Hammons	301	13	Monroe	Bibb Co.	
Elliot, David	Morgan Campbells	46	6	Monroe		
Ellis, Benjamin	Jasper Wallis	6	4	Monroe		
Ellis, Iddo	Putnam Walkers	254	1	Monroe	Pike County	
Ellis, John	Baldwin McGees	168	11	Monroe	Pike County	Upson Co.
Ellis, Reubin	Twiggs McCrays	101	13	Monroe		
Ellis, Robert	Warren Williams	37	3	Monroe	Pike County	
Elsworth, John	Richmond Luthers	135	3	Monroe	Lamar Co.	
Emanuel, David	Screven Mills	178	12	Monroe		
Embrees, William (Orps)	liberty Frasers	66	3	Monroe	Pike County	
Emery, Joseph	Jasper Barnes	77	2	Monroe	Pike County	Spalding Co.
England, Charles	Habersham McCrarys	84	7	Monroe	Pike County	Lamar Co.
Englaut, Jacob	Richmond Palmers	197	4	Monroe	Butts Co.	
English, John	Wilkinson Wiggins	17	14	Monroe	Butts Co.	
English, Wm.	Wilkinson Wiggins	31	8	Monroe	Pike County	Lamar Co.
Englut, Catharine	Richmond Palmers	341	13	Monroe	Bibb Co.	
Ennis, James	Camden Browns	123	2	Monroe	Pike County	
Epperson, Peter	Franklin Flemings	4	9	Monroe	Pike County	
Eppison, Samuel	Franklin Flemings	75	7	Monroe	Pike County	Lamar Co.
Ernst, Gottliet	Effingham 11 Dist.	75	6	Monroe		
Eskridge, John R.	Jackson, Scotts	240	2	Monroe	Pike County	Spalding Co.
Etheredge, Caswell	Warren Hammonks	9	5	Monroe		
Etheridge, Allen	Wilkinson Wiggins	205	4	Monroe	Butts Co.	
Etheridge, Saml.	Wilkinson Kettles	70	12	Monroe		
Ethridge, Elijah	Jones Haws	115	6	Monroe		
Ethridge, Thomas	Wilkinson Brooks	227	11	Monroe	Pike County	Upson Co.
Eubanks, John	Camden Halls	157	3	Monroe	Lamar Co.	
Evans, Arden	Wilkes Johnsons	244	15	Monroe	Pike County	Upson Co.
Evans, Darcas (Wid)	Richmond Burtons	145	15	Monroe	Pike County	Upson Co.
Evans, David	Madison, Vinyards	113	8	Monroe	Pike County	
Evans, Elizabeth (Wid)	Wilkes Freemans	130	11	Monroe	Lamar Co.	
Evans, Isham	Pulaski Roachs	228	11	Monroe	Pike County	Upson Co.
Evans, Jesse	Jones, Greshams	76	15	Monroe	Pike County	Upson Co.
Evans, William	Putnam Walkers	91	13	Monroe		
Evans, William	Lincoln Blalocks	14	14	Monroe	Butts Co.	
Everett, Jehu	Bullichs Denmarks	226	4	Monroe	Butts Co.	
Exley, Luke	Effingham 12th Dist.	169	8	Monroe	Pike County	
Exum, Benjamin	Wilkinson Lees	251	2	Monroe	Pike County	Lamar Co.
Exum, Benjamin	Wilkinson Lees	357	13	Monroe	Bibb Co.	
Faile, Judah M. (Wid)	Liberty Frasers	256	11	Monroe	Pike County	Upson Co.
Fails, John	Jones Huffs	178	1	Monroe	Pike County	
Faircloth, Allen	Jones Swaringens	139	3	Monroe		
Faircloth, Fredk. Sr.	Jones Miltons	151	8	Monroe	Pike County	
Faires, George G.	Chatham DeLyons	52	5	Monroe		
Fallin, Charles Sr.	Wilkes Moores	122	15	Monroe	Pike County	Upson Co.
Fannin, Chloe (Wid)	Morgan Shaws	17	4	Monroe		
Farby, Alexander	Putnam Buckners	191	7	Monroe	Lamar Co.	
Farley, Edward (Orp)	Morgan Youngs	62	6	Monroe		
Farley, Jane (Wid)	Morgan Youngs	129	4	Monroe	Butts Co.	
Farley, Marena (Orp)	Morgan Youngs	62	6	Monroe		
Farmer, Thomas	Franklin Seales	254	6	Monroe		
Farr, Joab (Orps)	Jackson Flanagans	158	2	Monroe	Pike County	
Farrar, Thomas J.	Morgan Harris	190	7	Monroe	Lamar Co.	
Farrel, John	Jones Pitts	115	12	Monroe		
Fee, Samuel	Gwinnett Davis	66	9	Monroe	Pike County	
Fenn, Henry W.	Pulaski McPhils	21	5	Monroe		
Ferand, Joseph	Chatham Raifords	99	14	Monroe	Butts Co.	
Ferguson, Robert (Orps)	Wilkinson Lees	180	8	Monroe	Pike County	
Ferguson, Wm.	Effingham 9 Dist.	134	3	Monroe	Lamar Co.	
Feries, Thomas	Richmond Burtons	10	1	Monroe	Pike County	Spalding Co.
Ferrill, Benjamin L.	Wayne Oneals	128	12	Monroe		
Ferrill, Byrd	Screven Bufrods	201	12	Monroe		
Fesy, Lancelot H.	Chatham Reids	94	12	Monroe		
Fielder, Avery J.	Hall McCutchens	219	13	Monroe		
Fielder, Elizabeth (Wid)Hall	McCutchen	248	8	Monroe	Pike County	
Fielder, Thomas	Morgan Nelsons	104	7	Monroe	Pike County	Lamar Co.
Figgs, James	Greene Jordans	195	4	Monroe	Butts Co.	
Findley, David	Twiggs Halls	169	9	Monroe	Pike County	
Findley, Rainey	Jasper Johns	100	4	Monroe	Butts Co.	
Fisher, Benjamin P.	Wilkes Johnsons	75	13	Monroe		
Fisher, Henry (Orps)	Chatham Rowills	234	7	Monroe	Lamar Co.	
Fiveash, John Sr.	Tattnall Johnsons	74	14	Monroe	Butts Co.	
Fizzear, Eli	Jasper Thornston	140	8	Monroe	Pike County	
Flake, John P.	Jones Haws	109	4	Monroe	Butts Co.	
Flanagan, Eve (Wid)	Jackson Flanagans	20	8	Monroe	Pike County	Lamar Co.
Flanagan, Wm. Sr.	Hall Buffington	89	12	Monroe		
Flanders, William	Emanuel Jordens	77	12	Monroe		
Fleming, Wm.	Madison Bones	58	5	Monroe		
Flewellen, Eaton	Jones Bowins	99	5	Monroe		
Flewellen, John	Jones Phillips	171	10	Monroe	Pike County	Upson Co.
Flinn, William	Warren Williams	168	10	Monroe	Pike County	Upson Co.
Flint, Augustus	Wilkes Willis	129	1	Monroe	Pike County	
Flint, Lucy (Wid)	Wilkes Moores	43	2	Monroe	Pike County	Spalding Co.
Flint, Sarah (Wid)	Wilkes Willis	208	5	Monroe		
Flinton, William (Orp)	Jones Huffs	15	15	Monroe	Pike County	Upson Co.
Florence, David	Lincoln Jones	141	2	Monroe	Pike County	Spalding Co.
Florence, Evans	Lincoln Jones	260	12	Monroe		
Flournoy, Wm.	Jasper Ryans	4	11	Monroe	Lamar Co.	
Flowers, Edward (Orps)	Jasper Shropshires	185	4	Monroe	Butts Co.	
Floyd, Benjamin	Oglethorpe 236	72	11	Monroe	Lamar Co.	
Floyd, Stephen P.	Screven Bufords	179	9	Monroe	Pike County	
Foard, Wm. (Orps)	Putnam Tomlinsons	208	8	Monroe	Pike County	
Fokes, Winnefred (Wid)	Jefferson Watkins	177	11	Monroe	Pike County	Upson Co.
Fokes, Wm. L.	Jefferson Halls	135	6	Monroe		
Folford, John	Jones Deens	72	6	Monroe		
Folk, John	Washington Eckles	206	10	Monroe	Pike County	Upson Co.
Folsom, Israel	Pulaski Lesters	25	11	Monroe		
Folsom, Laurence	Pulaski Lesters	106	7	Monroe	Pike County	Lamar Co.
Forbes, John	McIntosh 271 Dist.	132	8	Monroe	Pike County	
Ford, Joseph	Jefferson Halls	189	6	Monroe		
Ford, Valentine	Hancock Mattlocks	209	12	Monroe		
Forest, James	Jones Miltons	170	12	Monroe		
Forgerson, Norman	Elbert Dobbs	246	12	Monroe		
Forister, Hiram	Habersham Flanigans	230	15	Monroe	Pike County	Upson Co.
Formby, Nathan	Morgan Talbots	206	12	Monroe		
Formby, Obadieh	Morgan Talbots	183	11	Monroe	Pike County	
Forrester, Prisiller (Wid)	Greene Greers	138	7	Monroe	Lamar Co.	
Forrister, John Sr.	Habersham Grants	199	4	Monroe	Butts Co.	
Fort, Berry	Clark Hightowers	91	2	Monroe	Pike County	
Foster, Francis	Morgan Morrows	172	1	Monroe	Pike County	
Foster, Sarah (Wid)	Putnam Paces	201	7	Monroe	Lamar Co.	
Foster, William	Liberty Mills	58	1	Monroe	Pike County	Spalding Co.
Foster, William	Morgan Morrows	228	12	Monroe		
Foudren, James	Walton Williams	8	9	Monroe	Pike County	
Fouler, Solomon	Franklin Ramsays	135	7	Monroe	Lamar Co.	
Fouracres, Aaron	Camden Bates	28	8	Monroe	Pike County	Lamar Co.
Fouracres, Aaron	Camden Bates	39	9	Monroe	Pike County	
Fowler, Nathan	Walton williams	169	3	Monroe	Lamar Co.	
Fox, Jacobs	Chatham Scotts	199	15	Monroe	Pike County	Upson Co.
Fox, Richard W.	Putnam Bledsoes	46	5	Monroe		
Fox, William B.	Chatham Reeds	9	12	Monroe		
Foy, George	Effingham 11th Dist.	363	13	Monroe	Bibb Co.	
Francis, James	Richmond Burtons	109	6	Monroe		
Franklin, Esom (Orps)	Elbert Burdens	72	6	Monroe		
Franklin, Henry A.	Warren Wilders	50	10	Monroe	Pike County	Upson Co.
Franklin, Nelson (Orps)	Oglethorpe Jewells	121	15	Monroe	Pike County	Upson Co.
Franklin, William	Oglethorpe Jewells	212	1	Monroe	Pike County	
Frasier, Ephraim	Columbia Fews	174	6	Monroe		
Frasier, Nathanl.	Jefferson Whighams	104	11	Monroe	Lamar Co.	
Frasure, George	Hancock Fannins	166	7	Monroe	Lamar Co.	
Frazer, Ann (Wid)	Chatham Thiess	4	10	Monroe	Pike County	Upson Co.
Frazier, Wilkes	Washington Causes	83	15	Monroe	Pike County	Upson Co.
Freeman, Daniel	Jones Stallings	238	6	Monroe		
Freeman, Eleanor (Orp)	Screven Bufords	107	4	Monroe	Butts Co.	
Freeman, Francis A.	Jones Hansford	166	11	Monroe	Pike County	Upson Co.
Freeman, Frederick	Jackson Scotts	204	9	Monroe	Pike County	
Freeman, Henry H.	Franklin Ramsey	115	10	Monroe	Pike County	Upson Co.
Freeman, Henry H.	Franklin Ramsays	271	12	Monroe		
Freeman, James	Jasper Shropshire	73	1	Monroe	Pike County	Spalding Co.
Freeman, John	Washington Morrisons	36	4	Monroe		
Freeman, John	Jones Hansford	229	8	Monroe	Pike County	
Freeman, Josiah	Jasper Thorntons	182	3	Monroe		
Freeman, Nancy (Wid)	Jackson Fulchers	24	5	Monroe		
Freeman, Sarah (Wid)	Wilkes Slacks	244	7	Monroe	Lamar Co.	
Freeman, Thomas	Wilkes Freemans	215	6	Monroe		
Freeman, William (Orps)	Jasper Thorntons	190	3	Monroe		
Freeman, Wm. J. (Orp)	Screven Bufords	107	4	Monroe	Butts Co.	
Frezier, William	Richmond Burtons	256	12	Monroe		
Fry, Jesse	Chatham Thiess	179	6	Monroe		
Fudge, John	Richmond Luthers	206	8	Monroe	Pike County	
Fulghum, Stephen (Orps)	Morgan Lawsons	80	14	Monroe		
Fullwood, Andrew	Telfair Edwards	86	6	Monroe		
Fulton, Elizabeth (Wid)	Liberty Mills	51	4	Monroe		
Fulwood, James	Applin Bryans	159	9	Monroe	Pike County	
Fulwoods, William	Jones Mathers	210	8	Monroe	Pike County	
Funderburk, Jacob	Wilkinson Brooks	130	7	Monroe	Lamar Co.	
Funderburk, John	Jones Permenters	118	6	Monroe		
Fuquay, Abalom	Early Reids	168	6	Monroe		
Furus, Henry	Screven Conners	266	9	Monroe	Pike County	
Gabbert, George	Putnam Sanders	46	7	Monroe	Pike County	Lamar Co.
Gahagan, Biddy (Orp)	Richmond Lamars	188	8	Monroe	Pike County	
Gahagan, John J. (Orp)	Richmond Lamars	188	8	Monroe	Pike County	
Gaines, Ann T. (Wid)	Elbert Burdens	50	13	Monroe		
Gainey, Reddick	Emanuel Chasons	107	11	Monroe	Lamar Co.	
Galey, Ebenezer	Hall Carnes	134	1	Monroe	Pike County	
Galley, Robert (Orp)	Madison Vinyards	117	15	Monroe	Pike County	Upson Co.
Gammage, Nancy	Wilkes Matox	186	5	Monroe		
Gammage, Nathaniel	Jones Cabiniss	13	8	Monroe	Pike County	Lamar Co.
Gammage, Nathaniel	Jones Cabiniss	187	10	Monroe	Pike County	Upson Co.
Gandy, Bookey	Montgomery Adams	35	4	Monroe		
Ganey, Edmund	Emanuel Chasons	122	1	Monroe	Pike County	Spalding Co.
Gann, Nathan Sr.	Clark Harpers	246	13	Monroe	Bibb Co.	
Gann, Wm. Sr.	Clark Harpers	198	10	Monroe	Pike County	Upson Co.
Gardner, George	Chatham	55	3	Monroe	Pike County	Spalding Co.
Gardner, Jacob	Twiggs Houses	67	7	Monroe	Pike County	Lamar Co.
Gardner, John E.	Washington Mills	126	3	Monroe	Pike County	
Gardner, John E.	Washington Mills	104	5	Monroe		
Gardner, Rody (Wid)	Gwinnett Bridges	15	10	Monroe	Pike County	Upson Co.
Garland, Edward B.	Hancock Swints	203	5	Monroe		
Garner, Francis	Walton Wagnons	221	8	Monroe	Pike County	Lamar Co.
Garner, Osbon	Franklin Keltons	148	10	Monroe	Pike County	Upson Co.
Garner, Richard	Morgan Nelsons	26	2	Monroe	Pike County	
Garner, Richard	Morgan Nelsons	234	9	Monroe	Pike County	
Garner, Samuel	Twiggs Griffins	43	3	Monroe	Pike County	Spalding Co.
Garrard, Hiram	Putnam Hendricks	143	3	Monroe		
Garrason, James	Effingham 10th dist.	82	9	Monroe	Pike County	
Garret, Thomas	Jasper Johns	247	3	Monroe	Lamar Co.	
Garrett, Henry B.	Putnam Jurnigans	124	8	Monroe	Pike County	
Garrett, James	Gwinnett Ellisons	123	15	Monroe	Pike County	Upson Co.
Garrett, Thomas	Jasper Whites	33	4	Monroe		
Garrison, Thos. (Orp)	Wilkinson Williams	133	3	Monroe	Lamar Co.	
Garrot, Benjamin	Jasper Thomas	32	11	Monroe	Lamar Co.	
Gartrell, Jeremiah	Clarke Gartrells	147	9	Monroe	Pike County	
Gates, Benjamin	Wilkinson Lees	166	6	Monroe		
Gates, James Sr.	Jones Burkhalters	150	2	Monroe	Pike County	Spalding Co.
Gatlin, Churchwell (Orps)	Greene Slaughters	126	12	Monroe		
Gatlin, Churchwell (Orps)	Greene Slaughters	48	15	Monroe	Pike County	Upson Co.
Gaulding, Michael	Hancocks Claytons	110	9	Monroe	Pike County	
Gay, Jacob	Laurens Swearingens	155	12	Monroe		
Gay, Sarah (Wid)	Pulaski Regans	215	2	Monroe	Pike County	Spalding Co.
Gaylard, William	Richmond Brantleys	44	3	Monroe	Pike County	Spalding Co.
Gazque, Jane (Wid)	Richmond Lamars	131	9	Monroe	Pike County	
Geer, Wm. (S/Fredrick)	Greene Johnston	158	6	Monroe		
George, Brice	Tattnall Mobleys	269	11	Monroe	Pike County	Upson Co.
George, David G.	Burke Powells	65	3	Monroe	Pike County	
George, Rufus K.	Jones Cabiness	60	10	Monroe	Pike County	Upson Co.
George, Rufus K.	Jones Cabiness	158	12	Monroe		
George, William B.	Twiggs Thames	24	4	Monroe		
Gerrald, Erby	Warren Wilders	128	10	Monroe	Pike County	Upson Co.
Gerrald, Isaac	Clarke Burdells	6	3	Monroe	Pike County	
Gerralde, Isaac	Clarke Burdells	199	9	Monroe	Pike County	
Gibbons, Ann (Wid)	Lauren Smiths	135	1	Monroe	Pike County	
Gibbs, William	Elbert Upshaws	24	6	Monroe		
Gibon, Augusta	Chatham Mills	203	11	Monroe	Pike County	Upson Co.
Gibson, Churchwell Sr.	Warren Wilders	141	7	Monroe	Lamar Co.	
Gibson, Wm.	Warren Wilders	141	8	Monroe	Pike County	
Gideon, Francis	Lincoln Walkers	211	13	Monroe	Bibb Co.	
Gieger, Jeremiah	Effingham 10th Dist.	226	8	Monroe	Pike County	
Gilbert, Jabez	Morgan Sheppards	76	9	Monroe	Pike County	
Gilbert, lewis M.	Morgan Fitzpatrick	147	7	Monroe	Lamar Co.	
Gilbert, William	Laurens Smiths	99	3	Monroe	Pike County	
Gilbert, Wm.	Morgan Fitzpatrick	11	1	Monroe	Pike County	Spalding Co.
Gilder, Linnot	Walton Gilders	225	13	Monroe		
Gilkinson, James (Orps)	Habersham Words	25	3	Monroe	Pike County	
Gill, Hiram L.	Gwinnett Bridges	169	4	Monroe	Butts Co.	
Gill, Joseph	Morgan Youngs	141	5	Monroe		
Gill, Thomas Y.	Wilkes Barksdale	126	4	Monroe	Butts Co.	
Gillham, Elzekiel	Oglethorpe Jewells	8	3	Monroe	Pike County	
Gilliam, Miles	Washington Riddles	25	10	Monroe	Pike County	Upson Co.
Gillis, Murdoch	Emanuel Parkers	29	2	Monroe	Pike County	
Gills, Charity (Orp)	Screven Bufords	38	8	Monroe	Pike County	Lamar Co.
Gills, Nancy & Sarah (Orps)	Screven Bufords	38	8	Monroe	Pike County	Lamar Co.
Gilmer, Mildred (Wid)	Oglethorpe McCowns	199	1	Monroe	Pike County	
Gilmore, Hugh	Washington Floyds	42	7	Monroe	Pike County	Lamar Co.
Gilmore, William (Orps)	Hall Hammons	114	2	Monroe	Pike County	Spalding Co.
Gilmore, Wm.	Jefferson Whiggams	210	1	Monroe	Pike County	
Gilstrap, Charles	Twiggs Blackshear	95	7	Monroe	Pike County	Lamar Co.
Ginnings, Robert	Morgan Whitakers	58	2	Monroe	Pike County	
Girley, William	Walton Echols	330	13	Monroe	Bibb Co.	
Glascock, George	Habersham Trammell	185	6	Monroe		
Glaze, Jonathan	Putnam Walkers	364	13	Monroe	Bibb Co.	
Glenn, Nancy	Washington Robisons	130	4	Monroe	Butts Co.	
Glover, Milton P.	Jasper Bryans	22	11	Monroe	Pike County	Upson Co.
Gnann, Joshua	Effingham 11th Dist	112	5	Monroe		
Gober, John Y.	Franklin S. Harris	40	4	Monroe		
Godbee, William Jr.	Burke McRays	146	2	Monroe	Pike County	Spalding Co.
Godfrey, John (Orp/Wm)	Warren Williams	242	9	Monroe	Pike County	
Godfrey, Thomas	Walton Kolbs	243	15	Monroe	Pike County	Upson Co.
Godin, Cornelius	Bulloch Deloachs	14	13	Monroe		
Godwin, Simeon	Baldwin Whites	190	11	Monroe	Pike County	Upson Co.
Godwin, Wm.	Montgomery Adams	153	11	Monroe	Pike County	Upson Co.
Goff, Elias	Hall McCutchens	129	13	Monroe		
Goff, Louvicy (Wid)	Screven Mills	218	15	Monroe	Pike County	Upson Co.
Golden, Henry	Warren Hutchinson	259	12	Monroe		
Golding, Thomas W.	Oglethorpe Goldings	62	5	Monroe		
Goldsmith, Benj.	Chatham Mills	72	1	Monroe	Pike County	Spalding Co.
Golston, Zacheriah	Madison Vinyards	29	10	Monroe	Pike County	Upson Co.
Goode, Elizabeth (Wid)	Jasper 293 Dist	140	6	Monroe		
Goodger, Eliz. (Wid)	Greene Nelms	174	10	Monroe	Pike County	Upson Co.
Goodson, Noel	Putnam Tomlinsons	191	8	Monroe	Pike County	
Goodwin, Elijah	Warren Hammocks	103	1	Monroe	Pike County	Spalding Co.
Goodwin, Marcilla (Wid)	Hancock Feens	92	13	Monroe		
Goolsby, John T.	Jasper Shropshire	111	15	Monroe	Pike County	Upson Co.
Goolsby, Thornton B.	Oglethorpe McCowns	39	12	Monroe		
Goolsby, Waid	Oglethorpe Thorntons	237	7	Monroe	Lamar Co.	
Gordon, Samuel	Jefferson Flemings	131	10	Monroe	Pike County	Upson Co.
Gordon, Thomas	Warren Jernigans	239	4	Monroe	Butts Co.	
Gordy, George	Burke McCullers	92	8	Monroe	Pike County	
Gordy, Moses	Burke McCullers	239	9	Monroe	Pike County	
Gorham, Thomas	Effingham 11th Dist.	196	6	Monroe		
Goss, John	Camden Clarks	55	2	Monroe	Pike County	Spalding Co.
Gosset, Jacob	Madison Leepers	14	13	Monroe		
Gould, Thomas K.	McIntosh 22 Dist.	2	15	Monroe	Pike County	Upson Co.
Grace, Jeptha	Hancock Feens	89	6	Monroe		
Grace, Joshua	Hancock Feens	148	15	Monroe	Pike County	Upson Co.
Graddy, Frederick	Washington Eckles	181	5	Monroe		
Grady, Elizabeth (Wid)	Wilkes Johnsons	221	13	Monroe		
Grady, Jackson (Orp)	Hall McCutchen	54	9	Monroe	Pike County	
Grady, William	Richmond Lamars	88	5	Monroe		
Grady, William	Hall McCutchen	230	6	Monroe		
Graham, Green G.	Irwin Statehams	250	7	Monroe	Lamar Co.	
Graham, James	Laurens McClendons	121	8	Monroe	Pike County	
Graham, Jesse	Jackson Knoxs	45	5	Monroe		
Grandberry, George	Jefferson Halls	200	12	Monroe		
Gravett, Obadiah	Jackson Scotts	221	4	Monroe	Butts Co.	
Gray, Thomas	Bryan Demeres	230	8	Monroe	Pike County	
Greathouse, Abraham	Clarke Frosts	191	9	Monroe	Pike County	
Green, Caston	Elbert Upshaws	209	3	Monroe		
Green, Harmon	Wilkes Coopers	255	2	Monroe	Pike County	Lamar Co.
Green, Israel	Bulloch Deloachs	132	11	Monroe	Lamar Co.	
Green, John	Jones Haws	131	2	Monroe	Pike County	
Green, John	Bulloch Deloachs	21	13	Monroe		
Green, Sarah (Wid)	Baldwin Husons	22	9	Monroe	Pike County	
Green, William	Bulloch Duttons	111	4	Monroe	Butts Co.	
Greenway, Eliza	Elbert Wards	255	13	Monroe		
Greenway, John	Hall Cotter	14	11	Monroe		
Greenwood, William	Oglethorpe Bells	4	6	Monroe		
Greer, Elizabeth (Wid)	Morgan Patricks	143	10	Monroe	Pike County	Upson Co.
Greer, Jason	Putnam Morelands 238	238	8	Monroe	Pike County	
Greer, John	Clark Hightowers	165	8	Monroe	Pike County	
Gregory, Charles	Chatham Thiess	72	8	Monroe	Pike County	Lamar Co.
Gregory, James (Orps)	Jones "Mullins	159	15	Monroe	Pike County	Upson Co.
Gregory, Richard	Putnam Walkers	200	3	Monroe	Lamar Co.	
Greir, Benjamin	Jasper Johns	99	6	Monroe		
Gresham, Edward H.	Jones Huffs	140	5	Monroe		
Griffin, Lewis	Washington Coseys	133	8	Monroe	Pike County	
Griffin, Lewis, Jr.	Warren Jones	12	3	Monroe	Pike County	Spalding Co.
Griffin, Owen	Wilkes Mirees	226	11	Monroe	Pike County	Upson Co.
Griffin, Richard	Hancock Masons	243	3	Monroe		
Griffin, Thomas (Orps)	Irwin Gilders	216	10	Monroe	Pike County	Upson Co.
Griffis, Saml. Jr.	Appling Boyds	147	15	Monroe	Pike County	Upson Co.
Griffith, (?)	Early Reids	68	14	Monroe	Butts Co.	
Griggs, Saml.	Chatham Thiess	35	14	Monroe	Butts Co.	
Griggs, Wiley (Orps)	Hancock Mattocks	71	12	Monroe		
Grimes, Thomas	Jones Hansfords	53	8	Monroe	Pike County	Lamar Co.
Grimes, Travis (Orps)	Clark Sorrells	215	11	Monroe	Pike County	
Grimes, William G.	Greene Scotts	181	8	Monroe	Pike County	
Grimsley, William	Twiggs Tysons	16	6	Monroe		
Grinstead, Robert	Laurens Mathers	267	10	Monroe	Pike County	Upson Co.
Grisby, James (Orps)	Greene Johnsons	3	12	Monroe		
Grismer, William C.	Jasper Johns	233	4	Monroe	Butts Co.	
Grooms, Benjamin	McIntosh 24 Dist.	235	7	Monroe	Lamar Co.	
Grover, Peter, Sr.	Franklin Harris	129	2	Monroe	Pike County	
Groves, Eliza N. (Orp)	Lincoln Anthoney	233	3	Monroe	Lamar Co.	
Groves, Joseph	Jackson Flanagans	154	3	Monroe	Lamar Co.	
Guerry, Margaret (Wid)	Wilkinson Brooks	125	6	Monroe		
Guien, John B.	Richmond Brantleys	71	7	Monroe	Lamar Co.	
Guttery, Elizabeth (Wid)	Hall Buffington	32	6	Monroe		
Hackney, William	Greene Leftwichs	51	5	Monroe		
Haddaway, Cyrus A.	Wilkes Mattoxs	46	1	Monroe	Pike County	Spalding Co.
Hadden, Thomas	Jefferson Whighams	117	8	Monroe	Pike County	
Haden, Wm.	Wilkes Hillhouses	77	4	Monroe		
Hadley, Benj.	Jackson Mayes	109	2	Monroe	Pike County	Spalding Co.
Hagin, Stephen	Appling Newmans	196	1	Monroe	Pike County	
Hagins, Malachi	Bulloch Hagins	194	12	Monroe		
Hagler, Jacob	Walton Davis	100	1	Monroe	Pike County	Spalding Co.
Haile, Joel	Clarke Stewarts	51	10	Monroe	Pike County	Upson Co.
Haile, John H.	Chatham Mills	126	2	Monroe	Pike County	
Hale, John (Orps)	Warren Williams	236	1	Monroe	Pike County	
Hales, Bradley	Telfair Wilcox	37	11	Monroe	Lamar Co.	
Hall, Eli	Burke Scarbroughs	20	5	Monroe		
Hall, James B.	Richmond Luthers	124	11	Monroe	Lamar Co.	
Hall, Joanah (Wid)	Elbert Smiths	94	11	Monroe		
Hall, John	Columbia Cochrans	16	3	Monroe	Pike County	Spalding Co.
Hall, John B.	Jasper Barnes	49	8	Monroe	Pike County	Lamar Co.
Hall, Jonathan	Laurens Mathers	205	12	Monroe		
Hall, Mary (Wid)	Putnam Baughs	261	9	Monroe	Pike County	
Hall, Phebe (Wid)	Scriven Mills	68	7	Monroe	Pike County	Lamar Co.
Hall, Samuel	Hancock Loyds	39	11	Monroe	Lamar Co.	
Hall, Samuel (Orp)	Richmond Lamars	28	2	Monroe	Pike County	
Hall, William	Emanuel Prices	69	14	Monroe	Butts Co.	
Hall, William A.	Wilkinson Lees	3	2	Monroe	Pike County	
Halloway, Martha (Wid)	Jasper Martins	108	6	Monroe		
Halstead, Wm. C.	Twiggs Chains	60	5	Monroe		
Halsted, Daniel	Jones Permenters	252	7	Monroe	Lamar Co.	
Ham, John	Twiggs McCrarys	164	11	Monroe	Pike County	Upson Co.
Hambey, Nancy (Wid)	Morgan Youngs	72	10	Monroe	Pike County	Upson Co.
Hamblet, Samuel	Morgan Wagnons	249	3	Monroe	Lamar Co.	
Hambleton, Joseph J.	Jones Bowins	78	4	Monroe		
Hambleton, T. W.	Habersham Words	42	6	Monroe		
Hambrick, Thomas	Gwinnett Ellisons	192	8	Monroe	Pike County	
Hamby, Edmound	Morgan Shaws	218	5	Monroe		
Hamilton, Gideon	Chatham Mills	60	7	Monroe	Pike County	Lamar Co.
Hamilton, Robert	Elbert Terrells	109	11	Monroe	Lamar Co.	
Hamilton, William	Twiggs Halls	82	7	Monroe	Pike County	Lamar Co.
Hamlin, Jethro (Orp)	Jones Permenters	111	10	Monroe	Pike County	Upson Co.
Hammelton, Thos. D.	Jones Rossors	19	3	Monroe	Pike County	Spalding Co.
Hammock, Abel	Jones Flowers	153	1	Monroe	Pike County	
Hammock, Anna (Wid)	Early Hairs	204	4	Monroe	Butts Co.	
Hammock, Edward	Wilkes Bryants	56	12	Monroe		
Hammock, Robert B. L.	Jones Rossors	249	2	Monroe	Pike County	Lamar Co.
Hampton, Thomas	Walton Richs	1	4	Monroe		
Hancock, James	Gwinnett Davis	102	5	Monroe		
Hancock, Micajah	Oglethorpe Huffs	41	10	Monroe	Pike County	Upson Co.
Hancock, Saml.	Jackson Mays	155	13	Monroe		
Hancock, Thomas Jr.	Clarke McKelroys	270	10	Monroe	Pike County	Upson Co.
Hancock, Thos. (Orps)	Wilkes Reeves	233	11	Monroe	Pike County	Upson Co.
Hand, Rachel (Wid)	Jasper Barns	241	13	Monroe	Bibb Co.	
Handcock, William	Tattnall Mobleys	245	3	Monroe		
Handley, James	Putnam Buckners	71	15	Monroe	Pike County	Upson Co.
Handy, Nathaniel	Oglethorpe Holtzclaws	238	12	Monroe		
Hanna, James Jr.	Elbert Hannas	17	15	Monroe	Pike County	Upson Co.
Hanner, Wm. (Orps)	Scriven Conners	195	2	Monroe	Pike County	Lamar Co.
Hanson, John M.	Wilkes Callaway	180	1	Monroe	Pike County	
Hanson, John M.	Wilkes Callaways	177	8	Monroe	Pike County	
Hanson, Richard W.	Morgan Talbots	194	1	Monroe	Pike County	
Harbin, Sally (Wid)	Elbert Merretts	55	12	Monroe		
Harbuck, E. I. (Orp)	Richmond Burtons	241	12	Monroe		
Harbuck, John (Orps)	Warren Hutchinsons	36	10	Monroe	Pike County	Upson Co.
Harbuck, Mary (Wid)	Warren Jernigans	351	13	Monroe	Bibb Co.	
Harbuck, Mary B. (Wid)	Richmond Burtons	152	6	Monroe		
Harbuck, Sally E.D.L.C. (Orp)	Richmond Burtons	241	12	Monroe		
Hardaway, Francis	Warren Hutchinsons	199	6	Monroe		
Hardegree, Pleasant	Clark Sorrels	211	7	Monroe	Lamar Co.	
Harden, David	Hall McCutchens	153	8	Monroe	Pike County	
Harden, Isaiah	Tattnall Durrences	136	6	Monroe		
Hardiman, Thos.	Putnam Bledsoes	17	3	Monroe	Pike County	Spalding Co.
Hardimon, Joseph	Washington Robisons	108	3	Monroe	Pike County	Spalding Co.
Hardin, Adam	Putnam Jurnigans	12	12	Monroe		
Hardin, Sarah W. (Wid)	Putnam Jurnigans	90	1	Monroe	Pike County	Spalding Co.
Hardman, Neman	Oglethorpe 236th	35	11	Monroe	Lamar Co.	
Hardman, Wm.	Oglethorpe 236th	6	13	Monroe		
Hardy, Herbert	Jones Hansford	228	8	Monroe	Pike County	
Hardy, John	Franklin Burtons	173	15	Monroe	Pike County	Upson Co.
Hargrove, Wm. D.	Putnam Bledsoes	76	1	Monroe	Pike County	Spalding Co.
Harigan, Mabry	Jasper Newtons	147	12	Monroe		
Harlin, Zachariah	Oglethorpe Bowles	155	11	Monroe	Pike County	Upson Co.
Harmon, George W.	Elbert Dooleys	72	12	Monroe		
Harned, Wm. H.	Richmond Brantleys	78	12	Monroe		
Harp, James M.	Greene Cato's	138	8	Monroe	Pike County	
Harper, Shadrack	Liberty Frasers	64	10	Monroe	Pike County	Upson Co.
Harper, William	Putnam Tomlinsons	170	1	Monroe	Pike County	
Harper, Wyatt	Morgan Campbells	254	15	Monroe	Pike County	Upson Co.
Harralson, Bradley	Morgan Whitakers	134	13	Monroe	Bibb Co.	
Harrel, Abraham	Warren Hutchinsons	120	9	Monroe	Pike County	
Harrel, Hardy	Jefferson Whighams	258	10	Monroe	Pike County	Upson Co.
Harrel, Levy	Pulaski Lanairs	256	8	Monroe	Pike County	
Harrel, Moses	Pulaski Lanairs	210	9	Monroe	Pike County	
Harrell, Asa	Pulaski Lanairs	207	11	Monroe	Pike County	
Harrigall, Elizabeth (Wid)	Scriven Mills	163	4	Monroe	Butts Co.	
Harrington, Wm. W.	Chatham Raifords	212	12	Monroe		
Harris, Edward	Greene Johnstons	196	15	Monroe	Pike County	Upson Co.
Harris, Elizabeth (Wid)	Gwinnett Davis	183	8	Monroe	Pike County	
Harris, Gideon	Burke Dillard	186	4	Monroe	Butts Co.	
Harris, Henry L.	Clarke Frosts	159	10	Monroe	Pike County	Upson Co.
Harris, Isaac	Burke Lodges	52	11	Monroe		
Harris, James (Orps)	Columbia Gartrells	251	13	Monroe		
Harris, John	Hall Millers	143	13	Monroe		
Harris, Leonard	Oglethorpe Thorntons	119	9	Monroe	Pike County	
Harris, Samuel	Hancock Daniel	216	11	Monroe	Pike County	
Harris, Walton (Orps)	Clark Dickens	173	13	Monroe	Bibb Co.	
Harris, West (Rev)	Clark Burdells	61	5	Monroe		
Harris, William	Richmond Wares	122	5	Monroe		
Harrison, Betsey (Wid)	Columbia Fews	35	3	Monroe	Pike County	
Harrison, Charity (Wid)	Laurens McClendons	68	1	Monroe	Pike County	Spalding Co.
Harrison, Hiram	Franklin Burtons	106	3	Monroe	Pike County	Spalding Co.
Harrison, James	Putnam Bledsoes	180	5	Monroe		
Harrison, Jesse	Putnam Baughs	10	4	Monroe		
Harrison, John (Rev)	Jackson Olivers	28	4	Monroe		
Harrison, Saml. Wm.	Columbia Shaws	72	9	Monroe	Pike County	
Harrison, Wm.	Warren Williams	49	9	Monroe	Pike County	
Harriss, Absalom	Hancock Daniels	254	3	Monroe	Lamar Co.	
Harross, Richardson (Orps)	Putnam Hendricks	122	6	Monroe		
Harrup, John	Columbia Beals	46	11	Monroe		
Hart, Hardy	Twiggs Halls	204	3	Monroe		
Hart, Samuel	Hancock Fannins	239	6	Monroe		
Hartley, Hardy	Washington Jenkins	225	7	Monroe	Lamar Co.	
Hartley, Hillary	Washington Jenkins	188	15	Monroe	Pike County	Upson Co.
Hartley, Thomas (Orps)	Oglethorpe Jewells	93	2	Monroe	Pike County	
Hartsfield, Andrew	Madison Vineyards	42	1	Monroe	Pike County	Spalding Co.
Hartsfield, Middleton	Clark Dickens	105	4	Monroe	Butts Co.	
Harvard, Drewry	Washington Eckles	160	5	Monroe		
Harvell, Vines	Jasper Whites	223	2	Monroe	Pike County	Lamar Co.
Harvey, Sary (Wid)	Hall Hammons	240	15	Monroe	Pike County	Upson Co.
Harwell, Vines	Jasper Whites	98	15	Monroe	Pike County	Upson Co.
Haswell, John	Hancock Masons	27	1	Monroe	Pike County	Spalding Co.
Hatcher, John	McIntosh 21 Dist.	91	15	Monroe	Pike County	Upson Co.
Hatcher, Mastin	Jasper Dardens	148	7	Monroe	Lamar Co.	
Hattox, Rachel	Jasper Dardens	185	11	Monroe	Pike County	
Hatvey, Moses	Putnam Tomlinsons	69	12	Monroe		
Haughton, Thos. Sr.	Greene Greers	19	5	Monroe		
Haughton, Willis	Greene Greers	76	7	Monroe	Pike County	Lamar Co.
Havens, Andrew	Effingham 13 Dist.	1	14	Monroe		
Hawkins, Hezekiah (Orps)	Pulaski Regans	185	3	Monroe		
Hayes, Henry	Clark Deans	37	8	Monroe	Pike County	Lamar Co.
Hayes, John	Putnam Jurnigans	214	1	Monroe	Pike County	
Haymans, Stoutan Sr.	Bryan Smiths	9	14	Monroe	Butts Co.	
Haynes, Saml.	Morgan Wagnons	250	12	Monroe		
Hays, Daniel	Twiggs Blackshears	176	11	Monroe	Pike County	Upson Co.
Hays, Edward	Putnam Mehones	129	8	Monroe	Pike County	
Hays, Elijah	Habersham Taylors	102	11	Monroe	Lamar Co.	
Hays, Elizabeth (Wid)	Early Reids	194	7	Monroe	Lamar Co.	
Hays, Etheldred Reid	Early Reids	171	15	Monroe	Pike County	Upson Co.
Hays, James L.	Jackson Scotts	227	12	Monroe		
Head, Thomas	Wilkes Bryants	303	13	Monroe	Bibb Co.	
Heard, George Jr.	Gwinnett Dobbs	251	1	Monroe	Pike County	
Heard, Henry	Walton Wagnons	217	13	Monroe		
Heard, Hugh H.	Jasper Shropshires	57	1	Monroe	Pike County	Spalding Co.
Heard, James	Clark Fosters	251	7	Monroe	Lamar Co.	
Heard, John G. Jr.	Morgan Whitakers	206	6	Monroe		
Heard, Samuel	Jasper Thomas	27	10	Monroe	Pike County	Upson Co.
Hearn, Lot	Putnam Sanders	239	3	Monroe		
Hearn, Sarah (Wid)	Gwinnett Penleys	249	9	Monroe	Pike County	
Hearndon, Fieldin	Washington Barges	10	12	Monroe		
Hearndon, Thomas	Wilkinson Mims	160	11	Monroe	Pike County	Upson Co.
Heart, Grace (Orp)	Richmond Winters	69	8	Monroe	Pike County	Lamar Co.
Heart, Wm. & Rebecca (Orps)	Richmond Winters	69	8	Monroe	Pike County	Lamar Co.
Heath, Jorden, Jr.	Burke McRays	231	15	Monroe	Pike County	Upson Co.
Heath, Prusilla (Wid)	Burke McRays	151	15	Monroe	Pike County	Upson Co.
Heath, Sarah	Washington Mills	201	9	Monroe	Pike County	
Heeth, Richard Jr.	Warren Torrances	137	11	Monroe	Pike County	Upson Co.
Heeth, Rigdon	Wilkinson Pierces	222	15	Monroe	Pike County	Upson Co.
Heflin, William	Putnam Tomlinsons	55	4	Monroe		
Heflin, Wm.	Putnam Tomlinsons	143	11	Monroe	Pike County	Upson Co.
Heirs, David	Liberty McCranies	73	11	Monroe	Lamar Co.	
Helderbrand, David	Jasper Burneys	93	14	Monroe		
Helmley, David	Effingham 9 Dist.	190	2	Monroe	Pike County	Lamar Co.
Hembree, Amariah	Hall Hammons	231	10	Monroe	Pike County	Upson Co.
Hemphill, Alphanso	Morgan Fitzpatricks	229	6	Monroe		
Hemphill, Thomas (Orps)	Lincoln Walkers	20	12	Monroe		
Henderson, Elisha	Jasper Dardens	120	10	Monroe	Pike County	Upson Co.
Henderson, John (Orps)	Jasper Ryans	223	7	Monroe	Lamar Co.	
Henderson, Robert	Lincoln Parkes	184	2	Monroe	Pike County	Spalding Co.
Henderson, Robert	Hall Millers	149	13	Monroe		
Henderson, Saml. T.	Appling Bryans	46	10	Monroe	Pike County	Upson Co.
Hendley, Elmer	Emanuel Lanes	114	4	Monroe	Butts Co.	
Hendrick, Berry	Madison Vineyards	259	13	Monroe		
Hendrick, Isaac	Morgan Harriss	147	13	Monroe		
Hendrick, Joseph	Franklin Yanceys	133	10	Monroe	Pike County	Upson Co.
Hendrick, William	Elbert Upshaws	37	15	Monroe	Pike County	Upson Co.
Hendrix, Nancy (Wid)	Franklin Yanceys	264	11	Monroe	Pike County	Upson Co.
Hendry, Neal L. (Orps)	Morgan Shephards	86	13	Monroe		
Henley, Sarah (Wid)	Gwinnett Ellisons	218	12	Monroe		
Henson, Asa	Twiggs Houses	96	3	Monroe	Pike County	
Henson, Charles	Rabun Perrijahns	220	7	Monroe	Lamar Co.	
Herren, Sampson	Jasper Whites	59	11	Monroe		
Herrin, Jesse	Jefferson Whighams	153	10	Monroe	Pike County	Upson Co.
Herring, Fredk. G.	Twiggs Blackshers	215	4	Monroe	Butts Co.	
Herring, Jonathan	Oglethorpe 226th	163	13	Monroe		
Herring, Stephen	Franklin Harris	40	8	Monroe	Pike County	Lamar Co.
Herriss, John	Jasper Wallis	76	14	Monroe		
Hester, Wyatt	Greene Allens	227	15	Monroe	Pike County	Upson Co.
Hesterly, John	Gwinnett Pittmons	19	4	Monroe		
Hewet, John	Gwinnett Penleys	71	1	Monroe	Pike County	Spalding Co.
Hews, Reddick	Wilkinson Brooks	50	8	Monroe	Pike County	Lamar Co.
Hicks, David	Elbert Penns	118	9	Monroe	Pike County	
Hicks, Jane (Wid)	Emanuel Olivers	45	14	Monroe		
Hicks, Wm.	Wilkes Moores	196	9	Monroe	Pike County	
Higginbotham, B. (Orps)	Madison Baughs	122	2	Monroe	Pike County	
Higginbotham, Fran Jr	Elbert Burdens	100	12	Monroe		
Higginbotham, Thomas	Jones Bowins	165	6	Monroe		
Higgins, Joseph	Gwinnett Ellisons	176	12	Monroe		
Hightower, Henry	Telfair Edwards	233	10	Monroe	Pike County	Upson Co.
Hightower, Reuben	Elbert Oliver	246	6	Monroe		
Hightower, Wm.	Clark McKelroys	107	3	Monroe	Pike County	Spalding Co.
Hill, Isaac	Richmond Burtons	204	8	Monroe	Pike County	
Hill, Sally (Wid)	Oglethorpe Holtzclaws	214	13	Monroe		
Hill, Saml. B.	Jackson Fulchers	201	15	Monroe	Pike County	Upson Co.
HiLliard Sloane	Tattnall Durrance	173	7	Monroe	Lamar Co.	
Hilson, Middleton	Warren Travis	22	2	Monroe	Pike County	Spalding Co.
Hilton, Jediathan	Jefferson Halls	24	2	Monroe	Pike County	Spalding Co.
Hine, Saml.	Chatham Thiess	24	6	Monroe		
Hines, John	Greene Slaughters	20	4	Monroe		
Hines, Rachel (Wid)	Morgan Nelsons	229	15	Monroe	Pike County	Upson Co.
Hinesly, Alford	Wilkinson Kettles	331	13	Monroe	Bibb Co.	
Hinson, Elam	Twiggs Houses	243	9	Monroe	Pike County	
Hinson, Enoch	Morgan Harpers	25	5	Monroe		
Hinton, Lewis	Walton Richs	43	13	Monroe		
Hinton, Lovet	Clark Hightowers	160	2	Monroe	Pike County	
Hitson, Henry	Twiggs Tysons	184	12	Monroe		
Hix, Wily	Habersham Ritches	56	7	Monroe	Pike County	Lamar Co.
Hixon, Timothy	Wilkes Willis	230	3	Monroe	Lamar Co.	
Hobbs, Jas. (Orp/Wm)	Warren Hutchinsons	16	11	Monroe		
Hobbs, Jotham	Warren Harris	174	8	Monroe	Pike County	
Hobby, Francis J.	Pulaski Yarbrough	189	3	Monroe		
Hodge, Wm.	Jackson Scotts	12	4	Monroe		
Hodges, Alvy	Greene Winfields	144	12	Monroe		
Hodges, James	Tattnall Durrances	205	5	Monroe		
Hodges, Wm.	Clark Harpers	208	11	Monroe	Pike County	
Hoff, Washington	Wilkes Callaways	98	11	Monroe	Lamar Co.	
Hoge, Jacob	Warren Wilders	184	7	Monroe	Lamar Co.	
Hoge, Solomon	Columbia Shaws	59	3	Monroe	Pike County	
Hokit, Edmund	Jones Permenters	193	7	Monroe	Lamar Co.	
Holbrooke, Nathan	Chathams DeLyons	174	2	Monroe	Pike County	Spalding Co.
Holbrooks, James H.	Gwinnett Penleys	51	1	Monroe	Pike County	Spalding Co.
Holcomb, David (Orp)	Jasper Barnes	19	12	Monroe		
Holcombe, Henry	Baldwin Husons	261	12	Monroe		
Holden, Mathew	Franklin Ramsays	88	2	Monroe	Pike County	Spalding Co.
Holder, Daniel	Camden Clarks	4	8	Monroe	Pike County	Lamar Co.
Holder, John	Habersham Words	118	13	Monroe		
Holland, George W.	Jasper Whites	25	13	Monroe		
Holland, Wm. R.	Chatham Thiess	249	12	Monroe		
Hollaway, Anderson	Columbia Colliers	255	3	Monroe	Lamar Co.	
Hollaway, Mickelberry	Bulloch Duttons	44	6	Monroe		
Holley, John (Orps)	Elbert Dooleys	91	9	Monroe	Pike County	
Holliday, William	Burke Wards	64	14	Monroe		
Holliman, Elisha	Columbia Wrights	91	7	Monroe	Pike County	Lamar Co.
Holliman, John	Hancock Masons	93	1	Monroe	Pike County	Spalding Co.
Hollingsworth, James	Twiggs Thames	225	9	Monroe	Pike County	
Hollis, Elias	Gwinnett Tippins	69	11	Monroe	Lamar Co.	
Hollis, James	Morgan Youngs	113	2	Monroe	Pike County	Spalding Co.
Holliway, George (Orp	Morgan Wagnons	90	7	Monroe	Pike County	Lamar Co.
Holloway, Elisha	Warren Travis	181	6	Monroe		
Holloway, Wm.	Bulloch Duttons	49	13	Monroe		
Holmes, Jordin	Hancock Swints	216	5	Monroe		
Holsey, Benj. L.	Jefferson Whighams	62	2	Monroe	Pike County	
Holson, Martha (Wid)	Jasper Ryans	38	2	Monroe	Pike County	
Holt, Richard	Gwinnett Dobbs	6	1	Monroe	Pike County	Spalding Co.
Holt, Shadrack	Habersham McCrareys	18	3	Monroe	Pike County	Spalding Co.
Holt, William	OglethorpeHuffs	144	15	Monroe	Pike County	Upson Co.
Honiker, Robert (Orp)	Camden Clarke	13	6	Monroe		
Hood, Allen	Jasper Johns	78	8	Monroe	Pike County	Lamar Co.
Hooks, John	Wilkinson Lees	136	8	Monroe	Pike County	
Hooks, John	Wilkinson Lees	112	11	Monroe	Lamar Co.	
Hope, John	McIntosh 24 Dist.	140	11	Monroe	Pike County	Upson Co.
Hope, William	McIntosh 24 Dist.	148	6	Monroe		
Hopewell, Thos. (Orps)	Oglethorpe 235th	54	4	Monroe		
Hopkins, Jonathan M.	Warren Huberts	252	3	Monroe	Lamar Co.	
Hopps, Margaret (Wid)	Wayne Sangsters	238	4	Monroe	Butts Co.	
Hopson, Hardy	Jasper 293 Dist.	59	7	Monroe	Pike County	Lamar Co.
Hopson, Zachariah	Gwinnett Bridges	254	10	Monroe	Pike County	Upson Co.
Horn, Elijah	Gwinnett Davis	229	11	Monroe	Pike County	Upson Co.
Horn, Henry	Wilkinson Kettles	193	5	Monroe		
Horn, Henry E.	Putnam Mehones	200	10	Monroe	Pike County	Upson Co.
Horn, John (Orps)	Greene Winfields	178	11	Monroe	Pike County	Upson Co.
Horne, Joseph	Twiggs Halls	20	13	Monroe		
Horton, James	Jones Flowers	78	2	Monroe	Pike County	Spalding Co.
Horton, Levy (Orps)	Washington Barges	184	10	Monroe	Pike County	Upson Co.
Horton, Walker	Elbert Merritts	171	5	Monroe		
Houghton, William (Orps)	Greene Rankins	32	9	Monroe	Pike County	
Houlbrook, John D.	Franklin Harris	38	4	Monroe		
House, Darling B.	Franklin Williams	230	13	Monroe	Bibb Co.	
House, Saml. C.	Chatham Mills	149	9	Monroe	Pike County	
House, Thomas	Walton Williams	102	4	Monroe	Butts Co.	
House, Thomas	Twiggs Houses	203	9	Monroe	Pike County	
House, Wm. H.	Jasper Thorntons	43	6	Monroe		
How, Elizabeth (Wid)	Jones Flowers	128	2	Monroe	Pike County	
Howard, Alsey	Washington Jenkins	26	15	Monroe	Pike County	Upson Co.
Howard, Charles (Orps	Chatham Mills	287	13	Monroe		
Howard, David	Jasper Pollards	1	1	Monroe	Pike County	Spalding Co.
Howard, Henry	McIntosh 24 Dist.	116	7	Monroe	Pike County	Lamar Co.
Howard, Mordecia Sr.	Oglethorpe Cardwells	69	10	Monroe	Pike County	Upson Co.
Howard, Samuel	Wilkinson Lees	304	13	Monroe	Bibb Co.	
Howell, Elizabeth (Wid)	Laurens Deens	240	10	Monroe	Pike County	Upson Co.
Howell, James	Wilkinson Kittles	93	5	Monroe		
Howell, James	Twiggs Chains	124	15	Monroe	Pike County	Upson Co.
Howell, John	Twiggs Chains	161	8	Monroe	Pike County	
Howell, Rachel (Wid)	Hancock Masons	125	8	Monroe	Pike County	
Howell, William	Walton Kolbs	16	4	Monroe		
Hubbard, Joseph	Oglethorpe Thorntons	84	8	Monroe	Pike County	Lamar Co.
Hubbart, James	Chatham Thiess	95	14	Monroe		
Hubert, Moses	Wilkes Bryants	217	1	Monroe	Pike County	
Huckaby, Felix	Jones Flowers	98	8	Monroe	Pike County	
Huckaby, John	Wilkes Moores	167	5	Monroe		
Huddleston, John	Oglethorpe 235th	255	11	Monroe	Pike County	Upson Co.
Hudson, Allen	Putnam Johnsons	51	13	Monroe		
Hudson, Byrd	Jefferson Connells	224	12	Monroe		
Hudson, Elijah	Jefferson Whighams	62	12	Monroe		
Hudson, Gyllum	Elbert Tatoms	18	8	Monroe	Pike County	Lamar Co.
Hudson, Hall	Jefferson Smiths	68	9	Monroe	Pike County	
Hudson, Isaac (Orps)	Jefferson Smiths	171	7	Monroe	Lamar Co.	
Hudson, John	Jones Pitts	3	3	Monroe	Pike County	
Hudson, William	Jones Hawes	32	15	Monroe	Pike County	Upson Co.
Huff, Thomas	Putnam Baughs	329	12	Monroe		
Hughes, James	Baldwin McCrareys	49	12	Monroe		
Hughey, Ephraim	Morgan Harpers	238	1	Monroe	Pike County	
Hughs, Barnard H.	Wilkes Coopers	175	10	Monroe	Pike County	Upson Co.
Hughs, James	Baldwin McCrars	139	4	Monroe	Butts Co.	
Hughs, Sarah (Wid)	Morgan Stephens	193	4	Monroe	Butts Co.	
Hulen, Duke W.	Elbert Tatoms	189	12	Monroe		
Hulett, Henry Jr.	Telfair Lamkins	7	5	Monroe		
Hulin, Duke W.	Elbert Tatoms	53	1	Monroe	Pike County	Spalding Co.
Human, Jossiah	Madison Griffiths	100	15	Monroe	Pike County	Upson Co.
Humphries, Wm. C.	Baldwin McGees	139	10	Monroe	Pike County	Upson Co.
Humphry, John	Gwinnett Penleys	253	12	Monroe		
Hunster, Lewis	Richmond Burtons	63	7	Monroe	Pike County	Lamar Co.
Hunt, Anderson	Laurens Mathers	132	1	Monroe	Pike County	
Hunt, Anderson	Greene Scotts	177	6	Monroe		
Hunt, George	Greene Winfield	220	11	Monroe	Pike County	
Hunt, Tiba	Columbia Beals	155	1	Monroe	Pike County	
Hunt, Turner Jr.	Jasper Whites	108	13	Monroe		
Hunt, Turner Sr.	Jasper Whites	209	9	Monroe	Pike County	
Hunt, William	Jones Cabaniss	126	5	Monroe		
Hunt, William	Morgan Morrows	80	10	Monroe	Pike County	Upson Co.
Hunter, David	Rabun Perrijahns	74	3	Monroe	Pike County	Spalding Co.
Huntington, Alfred J.	Richmond Brantleys	53	13	Monroe		
Hurst, Humphrey	Clark McKelroys	61	13	Monroe		
Hurst, Jacob	Scriven Bracks	258	11	Monroe	Pike County	Upson Co.
Hurst, Samuel	Jackson Spruces	133	6	Monroe		
Huskie, Claton (Orps)	Washington Wimberlys	228	7	Monroe	Lamar Co.	
Hutchens, Ann (Wid)	Jasper Whites	153	12	Monroe		
Hutcherson, John	Jackson Haggards	66	1	Monroe	Pike County	Spalding Co.
Hutchinson, Jehu W.	Jones Permentes	42	4	Monroe		
Hutchinson, John	Clarke Sorrels	77	11	Monroe		
Hutchinson, Susan (Orp)	Chatham Mills	57	6	Monroe		
Ingram, John	Hancock Claytons	187	2	Monroe	Pike County	Lamar Co.
Ingram, John Sr.	Hall Cotters	63	11	Monroe	Lamar Co.	
Ingram, Josiah	Jefferson Whighams	12	6	Monroe		
Ingram, Moses	Hancock Claytons	118	4	Monroe	Butts Co.	
Inmon, Elizabeth (Wid)	Habersham Ritches	23	9	Monroe	Pike County	
Irby, Abraham (Orp)	Clarke Sorrells	10	15	Monroe	Pike County	Upson Co.
Irby, Herrod	Greene Nelms	212	11	Monroe	Pike County	
Irving, Mary (Wid)	Morgan Hendersons	18	14	Monroe	Butts Co.	
Isaacs, George (Orp)	Habersham McCrareys	77	14	Monroe		
Isdale, James J.	Warren Jernigans	198	9	Monroe	Pike County	
Ivey, Robert	Baldwin Stephens	20	1	Monroe	Pike County	Spalding Co.
Ivy, John	Warren Wilders	256	15	Monroe	Pike County	Upson Co.
Ivy, Wilkerson P.	Warren Huberts	164	13	Monroe	Bibb Co.	
Jackson, Alsey	Hancock Gilberts	47	6	Monroe		
Jackson, Burwell	Twiggs McCrays	7	4	Monroe		
Jackson, Charles	Hancock Feens	137	3	Monroe	Lamar Co.	
Jackson, David	Gwinnett Davis	19	15	Monroe	Pike County	Upson Co.
Jackson, Edmond	Wilkes Slacks	123	3	Monroe	Pike County	
Jackson, Henry Sr.	Hancock Nelsons	25	15	Monroe	Pike County	Upson Co.
Jackson, James	Washington Whitfields	53	11	Monroe		
Jackson, John	Greene Woodhams	65	4	Monroe		
Jackson, John (Orps)	Oglethorpe McCowns	92	3	Monroe	Pike County	
Jackson, Mills	Wilkinson Williams	31	1	Monroe	Pike County	Spalding Co.
Jackson, Nathaniel	Morgan Nelsons	197	13	Monroe	Bibb Co.	
Jackson, Sarah (Wid)	Baldwin Doles	61	15	Monroe	Pike County	Upson Co.
Jackson, Thomas	Jasper 293 Dist.	45	6	Monroe		
Jacobs, Elisha	Walton Williams	223	10	Monroe	Pike County	Upson Co.
James, Absalom	Greene Mercers	217	9	Monroe	Pike County	
James, Anna (Wid)	Putnam Jurnigans	75	3	Monroe	Pike County	Spalding Co.
James, Charles	Walton Ellisons	146	9	Monroe	Pike County	
James, James	Warren Jones	59	9	Monroe	Pike County	
James, John	Jasper Johns	195	5	Monroe		
Jameson, James	Twiggs Blackshears	142	7	Monroe	Lamar Co.	
Jarratt, Rebecca F. (Wid)	Baldwin Hustons	7	3	Monroe	Pike County	
Jarrell, James S.	Madison Vinyards	109	12	Monroe		
Jarrell, Samuel F.	Franklin cokers	38	15	Monroe	Pike County	Upson Co.
Jarrell, Thomas	Greene Rankins	24	9	Monroe	Pike County	
Jarret, John	Lincoln Blalocks	82	15	Monroe	Pike County	Upson Co.
Jarrett, Deveroux	Habersham McCrarys	166	4	Monroe	Butts Co.	
Jarten, Joyce	Tattnall Mobleys	193	2	Monroe	Pike County	Lamar Co.
Jarvis, Patrick F.	Burke Jourdans	94	10	Monroe	Pike County	Upson Co.
Jenkins, Wm	Jackson Olivers	29	1	Monroe	Pike County	Spalding Co.
Jenkins, Jesse	Warren Jones	200	8	Monroe	Pike County	
Jenkins, Mansfield	Gwinnett Pitmons	54	3	Monroe	Pike County	Spalding Co.
Jenkins, Peyton R.	Morgan Campbells	188	12	Monroe		
Jennings, Robert	Oglethorpe Bowles	170	4	Monroe	Butts Co.	
Jennings, Joshua (orps)	Oglethorpe 225th dist	118	11	Monroe	Lamar Co.	
Jentner, William	Chatham Raifords	61	10	Monroe	Pike County	Upson Co.
Jernigan, Aaron	Irwin Gilders	27	8	Monroe	Pike County	Lamar Co.
Jernigan, Hardy	Hancock Johnstons	164	6	Monroe		
Jewett, Eliza Ann (Wid)	Chtham Theiss	56	14	Monroe	Butts Co.	
Jines, Jabez	Washington Floyds	23	5	Monroe		
Jinkins, James R. (Orphs)	Greene Gregorys	182	7	Monroe	Lamar Co.	
Jinks, wm.	Clarke Garlingtons	88	7	Monroe	Pike County	Lamar Co.
John, Joshua (Orps)	Twiggs Tysons	153	4	Monroe	Butts Co.	
Johns, George	Camden Bates	154	15	Monroe	Pike County	Upson Co.
Johns, Jermiah	Camden Bates	214	12	Monroe		
Johns, Levi (Orps)	Camden Bates	91	10	Monroe	Pike County	Upson Co.
Johnson, Emanuel	Burke Burkes	11	6	Monroe		
Johnson, Errie	Liberty Frasers	72	5	Monroe		
Johnson, Littleberry	Greene Gregorys	247	6	Monroe		
Johnson, Allen (Orps)	Hall Milelrs	114	10	Monroe	Pike County	Upson Co.
Johnson, George H.	Columbia Wrights	222	9	Monroe	Pike County	
Johnson, George W.	Oglethorpe Huffs	49	11	Monroe		
Johnson, Henry	Franklin Duncans	136	4	Monroe	Butts Co.	
Johnson, John	Tattnall Padgetts	62	4	Monroe		
Johnson, John	Wilkes Hudspeth	64	11	Monroe	Lamar Co.	
Johnson, Labourn S.	Putnam Brooks	44	8	Monroe	Pike County	Lamar Co.
Johnson, Luke	Oglethorpe McCowns	238	9	Monroe	Pike County	
Johnson, Nancy (Wid)	Greene Rankins	52	8	Monroe	Pike County	Lamar Co.
Johnson, Patrick H.	Wilkes Hillhouses	78	3	Monroe	Pike County	Spalding Co.
Johnson, Peter C.	Greene Tuckers	115	3	Monroe	Pike County	Spalding Co.
Johnson, Robert (of A)	Warren Huberts	108	12	Monroe		
Johnson, Samuel	Putnam Johnsons	133	15	Monroe	Pike County	Upson Co.
Johnson, Sankey T.	Greene Johnsons	233	8	Monroe	Pike County	
Johnson, Thomas	Jackson Flanagans	48	6	Monroe		
Johnson, William	Twiggs Batemans	106	6	Monroe		
Johnson, Wm. (orp)	Appling Boyds	150	10	Monroe	Pike County	Upson Co.
Johnson, Wm. C.	Hancock Daniels	171	4	Monroe	Butts Co.	
Johnson, Hugh G.	Jasper Pollards	241	15	Monroe	Pike County	Upson Co.
Johnson, Phillip	McIntosh 271 Dist	225	3	Monroe	Lamar Co.	
Johnson, Thomas Sr.	Lincoln Graves	97	8	Monroe	Pike County	
Johnston, Lancelott	Morgan Shaws	254	13	Monroe		
Johnston, Mosses	Burke Palmers	174	4	Monroe	Butts Co.	
Johnston, Patty (Wid)	Pulaski Roachs	296	13	Monroe	Bibb Co.	
Johnston, Samuel (orps)	Early Reids	188	6	Monroe		
Johnston, Thomas	Jackson Flanagans	112	9	Monroe	Pike County	
Johnston, Thos.	Jefferson Connells	81	9	Monroe	Pike County	
Johnston, Augans	Elbert Dooleys	197	3	Monroe	Lamar Co.	
Johnston, David	Chatham	169	13	Monroe	Bibb Co.	
Joiner, Jesse	Laurens Mathers	17	7	Monroe	Pike County	Lamar Co.
Jolley, William	Wlaton Gilders	2	11	Monroe	Lamar Co.	
Jones Elijah	Jasper Ryans	206	5	Monroe		
Jones James	Putnam Brooks	131	6	Monroe		
Jones, Benjamin	Baldwin Harriss	32	5	Monroe		
Jones, Allen	Washington Floyds	40	1	Monroe	Pike County	Spalding Co.
Jones, David T.	Emanuel Jordans	66	11	Monroe	Lamar Co.	
Jones, Elijah	Jasper Ryans	79	3	Monroe	Pike County	Spalding Co.
Jones, Elijah	Warren Jones	262	13	Monroe	Bibb Co.	
Jones, Elizabeth W. (Wid)	Jefferson Halls	84	4	Monroe		
Jones, James	Jones Huffs	74	10	Monroe	Pike County	Upson Co.
Jones, John	Jasper Pollards	6	2	Monroe	Pike County	
Jones, John B.	Putnam Hendricks	67	13	Monroe		
Jones, John E.	Morgan Harriss	129	3	Monroe	Lamar Co.	
Jones, John T,. (Oprs)	Jefferson Halls	16	10	Monroe	Pike County	Upson Co.
Jones, Leonard	Jasper 365 Dist.	47	3	Monroe	Pike County	Spalding Co.
Jones, Lewis Sr.	Franklin S. Harris	2	4	Monroe		
Jones, Matthew	Tattnall Griders	234	8	Monroe	Pike County	
Jones, Nathan Sr.	Morgan Patricks	203	13	Monroe	Bibb Co.	
Jones, Nonery	Putnam Sanders	71	8	Monroe	Pike County	Lamar Co.
Jones, Retiney H (Wid)	Putnam Mehones	225	1	Monroe	Pike County	
Jones, Sarah (Wid)	Jefferson Smiths	18	6	Monroe		
Jones, Smith	Morgan Wagnons	166	1	Monroe	Pike County	
Jones, Stephen	Warren Hutchinsons	50	14	Monroe	Butts Co.	
Jones, William	Hall Milelrs	57	11	Monroe		
Jones, Robert	Green Scotts	143	5	Monroe		
Jones, Robert	Jasper Burneys	269	10	Monroe	Pike County	Upson Co.
Jones, Robert T.	Jasper Thomas	41	3	Monroe	Pike County	Spalding Co.
Jones, Samuel F	Jones Burkhalters	43	7	Monroe	Pike County	Lamar Co.
Jones, Seaborn (Orps)	Oglethorpe 236th Dist	89	4	Monroe		
Jones, Stephen	Morgan Talbots	11	7	Monroe	Pike County	Lamar Co.
Jones, Thomas (of B. C.)	Warren Harriss	68	10	Monroe	Pike County	Upson Co.
Jones, Thomas (Orps)	Columbia Paynes	233	12	Monroe		
Jones, Thomas Sr.	Warren Harriss	27	2	Monroe	Pike County	
Jones, Wiley	Elbert Smiths	80	11	Monroe		
Jones, William	Twiggs Blackshears	220	8	Monroe	Pike County	
Jones, Wm. H	Morgan Hrpers	200	1	Monroe	Pike County	
Jones, Wright	Twiggs Tysons	88	10	Monroe	Pike County	Upson Co.
Jordan, Charles C.	Columbia Gartrells	79	2	Monroe	Pike County	Spalding Co.
Jordan, Chrles C.	Gwinnett Dobbs	9	9	Monroe	Pike County	
Jordan, Henry D.	Laurens Deens	129	10	Monroe	Pike County	Upson Co.
Jordan, Jinnet (Wid)	Oglethorpe McCowens	105	10	Monroe	Pike County	Upson Co.
Jordan, Miles (Orps)	Columbia Gartrells	165	7	Monroe	Lamar Co.	
Jordan, Avan	Jefferson Whighams	181	13	Monroe		
Jordan, Caroline (Orp)	Chatham Reids	96	6	Monroe		
Jossey, Joshua	Warren Travis	214	8	Monroe	Pike County	
Jourdan, Absalom	Wilkinson Brooks	167	4	Monroe	Butts Co.	
Jourdan, Richard	Wilkinson Pierces	72	14	Monroe	Butts Co.	
Jourdin, Benj. S.	Morgan Morrows	16	15	Monroe	Pike County	Upson Co.
Jourdin, James Jr.	Oglethorpe Crdwells	190	5	Monroe		
Jowen, James (orps)	Emanuel Lnes	214	6	Monroe		
Joyce, Henry	Montgomery McCranies	80	2	Monroe	Pike County	Spalding Co.
Joyce, william	Washington Coaseys	264	10	Monroe	Pike County	Upson Co.
Joyner, Mary (Wid)	Baldwin Stephens	55	14	Monroe	Butts Co.	
Juel, Humphra	Emanuel Olivers	210	6	Monroe		
Juel, Zachariah	Emanuel Olivers	7	1	Monroe	Pike County	Spalding Co.
Juiner, John	Greene Tuckers	84	11	Monroe		
Justice, David	Jackson Stricklands	268	10	Monroe	Pike County	Upson Co.
Kannon, Warner	Columbia Fews	39	2	Monroe	Pike County	
Keddie, John H.	Burke Lodges	138	6	Monroe		
Keen, David	Tattnall McInnis	292	13	Monroe		
Keen, Georgie	Tatnall McInnis	138	2	Monroe	Pike County	Spalding Co.
Keenum, Lewis	Jackson Hansons	144	6	Monroe		
Kellum, Samuel	Oglethorpe 235th Dist	161	1	Monroe	Pike County	
Kelly, James	Pulaski Lanairs	123	11	Monroe	Lamar Co.	
Kelly, Charles R	Walton Kolbs	190	10	Monroe	Pike County	Upson Co.
Kelly, John (Orp)	Wayne Jacobs	30	2	Monroe	Pike County	
Kelly, Redick	Walton Richs	76	11	Monroe		
Kelly, Robert	Jasper Thorntions	92	15	Monroe	Pike County	Upson Co.
Kenady, Ambrose	Hall Millers	13	9	Monroe	Pike County	
Kenah, Benjamin	Screven Bests	199	13	Monroe	Bibb Co.	
Kendall, David (Dr.)	Hancock Daniels	243	1	Monroe	Pike County	
Kendall, David (Dr.)	Hancock Daniels	125	13	Monroe		
Kendrick, Burmell	Putnam Leggetts	116	13	Monroe		
Kendrick, Harvey	Putnam Leggetts	180	12	Monroe		
Kendrick, Hezekiah	Putnam Hendricks	254	2	Monroe	Pike County	Lamar Co.
Kendrick, John	Columbia Shaws	212	3	Monroe		
Kendrick, Richmond R.	Putnam Hendricks	9	2	Monroe	Pike County	Spalding Co.
Kendrick, Robert	Greene Winfields	289	13	Monroe		
Kenedy, Sabry (Orp)	McIntosh 21 Dist	202	13	Monroe	Bibb Co.	
Kenedy, Daniel (Orp)	McIntosh 21 Dist	202	13	Monroe	Bibb Co.	
Kenedy, Joseph (Orp)	McIntosh 21 Dist.	202	13	Monroe	Bibb Co.	
Kenedy, Richard	Bulloch Williams	71	5	Monroe		
Kenedy, Robert	Gwinnett Pitmans	13	7	Monroe	Pike County	Lamar Co.
Kenedy, William (Orp)	McIntosh 21 Dist	202	13	Monroe	Bibb Co.	
Kenida, Allen (Orp)	Effingham 10 Dist.	207	5	Monroe		
Kennedy, Fields	Richmond Lamars	254	7	Monroe		
Kennedy, Francis (Orp)	Burke Seegars	209	5	Monroe		
Kennon, Celia (Wid)	Morgan Morrows	16	14	Monroe	Butts Co.	
Kent, John	Morgan Fitzpatricks	74	13	Monroe		
Kent, Price	Twiggs Houses	264	13	Monroe	Bibb Co.	
Kent, Wyley	Jones Pitts	269	12	Monroe		
Kerby, Henry	Morgan Nelsons	72	3	Monroe	Pike County	
Kerby, Sarah (Wid)	Richmond Winters	154	6	Monroe		
Key, Jesse	Gwinnett Bridges	70	10	Monroe	Pike County	Upson Co.
Key, Joshua	Richmond Luthers	23	10	Monroe	Pike County	Upson Co.
Key, William T.	Burke Wards	48	7	Monroe	Pike County	Lamar Co.
Keys, Thos.	Elbert Ruckers	173	4	Monroe	Butts Co.	
Killa, Gunrod	Washington Williams	92	5	Monroe		
Killabrew, John	Warren Travis	111	12	Monroe		
Kilpatrick, Richd.	Putnam Paces	78	7	Monroe	Pike County	Lamar Co.
Kimbell, David, Jr.	Oglethorpe Goldings	5	9	Monroe	Pike County	
Kimbell, Christopher	Clarke Garlingtons	1	9	Monroe	Pike County	
Kimble, Henry	Morgan Shaws	193	11	Monroe	Pike County	Upson Co.
Kimmey, John	Jones Coxs	159	7	Monroe	Lamar Co.	
King, Ephraim	Burke Lodges	32	12	Monroe		
King, John	Gwinnett Davis	31	3	Monroe	Pike County	
King, John	Baldwin Doles	177	13	Monroe	Bibb Co.	
King, Luanny orp	Wayne Oneil	186	9	Monroe	Pike County	
King, Tandy D	Jasper Pollard	56	1	Monroe	Pike County	Spalding Co.
King, Tandy D	Jasper Pollard	231	11	Monroe	Pike County	Upson Co.
King, Joseph	Twiggs Bozemans	222	7	Monroe	Lamar Co.	
Kinney, Thomas Jr	Morgan Young	211	3	Monroe		
Kirkland, S.	Emanuel Lanes	123	1	Monroe	Pike County	Spalding Co.
Kirkland, Timothy	Bullock Willimas	89	15	Monroe	Pike County	Upson Co.
Kirkland, Abraham L	Enmanuel Lanes	251	8	Monroe	Pike County	
Kirkpatrick, James H	Morgan Nelson	216	15	Monroe	Pike County	Upson Co.
Kirksey, Isaac orps	Pulaski Lester	218	9	Monroe	Pike County	
Kirksey, Lovy wid	Pulaski Lester	97	4	Monroe	Butts Co.	
Kitchens, Lawrence	Warren Harris	138	3	Monroe	Lamar Co.	
Kitchens, Ransom	Jasper Barnes	141	4	Monroe	Butts Co.	
Kittrell, Joshua	Greene Gregorys	59	10	Monroe	Pike County	Upson Co.
Kittrell, Joshua	Greene Gregorys	64	12	Monroe		
Knoles, Emanuel	Irwin Gilders	56	15	Monroe	Pike County	Upson Co.
Kolb, William G.	Jones Cabaniss	257	10	Monroe	Pike County	Upson Co.
Kollock, Lemuel (Dr)	Chatham Mills	256	1	Monroe	Pike County	
Kugley, John G.	Chatham Thiess	127	5	Monroe		
Lackey, Thomas	Greene Griers	235	8	Monroe	Pike County	
Lain, Turner	Habersham Flanagans	17	12	Monroe		
Lamar, Ezekiel	Clarke Browns	156	8	Monroe	Pike County	
Lamar, John	Lincoln Leverets	208	13	Monroe	Bibb Co.	
Lamar, Lucy (Wid)	Columbia Bealls	96	9	Monroe	Pike County	
Lamar, Nathan	Morgan Shaws	214	7	Monroe	Lamar Co.	
Lamkin, Lewis Ablewis	Telfair Lamkins	238	11	Monroe	Pike County	Upson Co.
Landers, Jesse	Walton Wests	146	8	Monroe	Pike County	
Lane, Bryant	Pulaski Roachs	227	10	Monroe	Pike County	Upson Co.
Lane, Lewis	Wilkes Slacks	158	8	Monroe	Pike County	
Lane, Richard Q.	Jasper Johns	81	8	Monroe	Pike County	Lamar Co.
Lang, David	Camden Baileys	101	6	Monroe		
Lang, David	Camden Baileys	125	9	Monroe	Pike County	
Langston, Asa	Franklin S. Harris	57	4	Monroe		
Lankford, W.	Clarke Sorrels	258	12	Monroe		
Laseter, James	Clarke Daves	282	13	Monroe	Bibb Co.	
Laslee, Neill	Telfair Robertsons	53	7	Monroe	Pike County	Lamar Co.
Lasseter, Luke	Lauren Stevens	34	4	Monroe		
Lassiter, Amos	Bulloch Denmarks	103	15	Monroe	Pike County	Upson Co.
Lastinger, David	Bullock Denmarks	3	6	Monroe		
Lee, Alexander	Wilkinson Brook	28	12	Monroe		
Lee, Barney	Franklin Holsonba	151	12	Monroe		
Lee, Elijah	Morgan Fitzpatr	153	9	Monroe	Pike County	
Lee, Elizab wd	Glynn Burnett	181	15	Monroe	Pike County	Upson Co.
Lee, Green	Morgan, Shaw	49	5	Monroe		
Lee, James	Walton, Walton	249	11	Monroe	Pike County	Upson Co.
Lee, John	Screven, Waters	41	9	Monroe	Pike County	
Lee, Reuben	Gwinnett Bridges	221	6	Monroe		
Lee, Sarah wd	Baldwin, Malcom	26	6	Monroe		
Lee, Wm Gaston	Chatham Thiess	220	15	Monroe	Pike County	Upson Co.
Leek, Thomas	Jefferson Connell 157s	157	9	Monroe	Pike County	
Leftwich, Joel W	Greene Leftwich	249	15	Monroe	Pike County	Upson Co.
Legett, Alex. Orps	Ogleth Cardwell	13	13	Monroe		
Legett, Mary Wd.	Ogleth Cardwell	71	3	Monroe	Pike County	
Legg, Gustavus	Jackson Scotts	270	13	Monroe	Bibb Co.	
Leggett, Alsey wd	Putnam Leggett	56	8	Monroe	Pike County	Lamar Co.
Lemonds, Wm	Walton, Wagnon	190	12	Monroe		
Leonard. Frances	Baldwin McGee	247	7	Monroe	Lamar Co.	
Leopard, Holland	Jackson Spruce	215	5	Monroe		
Leptrot, Jesse Orps	Burke McCuller	228	4	Monroe	Butts Co.	
Lesner, Jordan B	Baldwin Stephens	189	9	Monroe	Pike County	
Lester, Ezekiel	Burke Cavenah	128	3	Monroe	Pike County	
Letorey, Peter	Chatham Mills	139	9	Monroe	Pike County	
Level, Edward	Hall Abercrom	223	12	Monroe		
Leveritt, Rob S	Ogleth Bowls	15	7	Monroe	Pike County	Lamar Co.
Leveritte, Jourdan	Lincoln Leverett	219	6	Monroe		
Levingston, Jane wd	Putnam Baugh	54	15	Monroe	Pike County	Upson Co.
Leviston, Jesse	Jones Burkhalt	1	12	Monroe		
Lewis, George	Green Catos	128	7	Monroe	Pike County	
Lewis, George	Wilkinson Lee	246	11	Monroe	Pike County	Upson Co.
Lewis, Ira	Greene Astin	227	13	Monroe		
Lewis, Jer'h orp	Burke Palmer	183	1	Monroe	Pike County	
Lewis, John	Greene Scotts	111	13	Monroe		
Lewis, Wm	Columbia Collier	119	5	Monroe		
Lightfoot, JamesSor	Hancock Fannin	23	3	Monroe	Pike County	Spalding Co.
Ligon, Woodson	Richmond Luther	181	7	Monroe	Lamar Co.	
Lillebridge, Robt	Chatham Reid	99	15	Monroe	Pike County	Upson Co.
Lindsey, Dolphin	Jasper Dardens	316	14	Monroe		
Lindsey, Jacob	Jones Gresham	164	3	Monroe	Lamar Co.	
Lindsey, John	Montgomery McCranie	52	10	Monroe	Pike County	Upson Co.
Lippitt, Warren	Chatham Thiess	108	5	Monroe		
Lippitt, Warren	Chatham Thiess 164s	164	8	Monroe	Pike County	
Litefoot, John	Burke Roberts	33	14	Monroe	Butts Co.	
Litefoot, Lucretia	Burke Burkes	246	4	Monroe		
Litteral, Richard	Hall Wallace	237	6	Monroe		
Little, Jonathan	Pulaski Robison	9	15	Monroe	Pike County	Upson Co.
Little, William	Putnam Jurnigan	128	1	Monroe	Pike County	Spalding Co.
Little, William	Putnam Jurnigan	246	2	Monroe	Pike County	Spalding Co.
Little, Wm	Jefferson Smith	60	1	Monroe	Pike County	Spalding Co.
Lock, David	Jones Flowers 25n	25	12	Monroe		
Lockhart, John	Bulloch Williams	145	6	Monroe		
Loftin, John	Putnam Bledsoe	228	5	Monroe		
Loftin, John	Putnam Bledsoe	107	12	Monroe		
Lokey, Dinglee	Warren, Williams	134	4	Monroe	Butts Co.	
Lokey, Joseph	Jones Permente	106	12	Monroe		
Lokey, Rachel wd	Franklin Yancey	115	8	Monroe	Pike County	
Long, Asa or	Effingham 10 Dis	244	1	Monroe	Pike County	
Long, Henry Jr	Hancock Fannin	105er	13	Monroe		
Long, Littleton	Jones Huffs	239	1	Monroe	Pike County	
Long, Nicholas or	Wilkes Hillhouse	186	7	Monroe	Lamar Co.	
Long, Wm	Jefferson Halls	229	5	Monroe		
Love, Daniel	Telfair Love	125	1	Monroe	Pike County	Spalding Co.
Lovett, ThosFJr	Screven Mills	161	11	Monroe	Pike County	Upson Co.
Loving, Richard	Clark Frosts	173	6	Monroe		
Lowe, Samuel	McIntosh 274 Dis	39	15	Monroe	Pike County	Upson Co.
Lowry, George W	Jasper, Newton	277	13	Monroe	Bibb Co.	
Lowry, James LM	Franklin Fleming	16	2	Monroe	Pike County	Spalding Co.
Lowry, Jane wd	Jefferson Fleming	5	4	Monroe		
Lowry, Solomon	Appling Newman 94re	94	2	Monroe	Pike County	
Loyd, Mary wd	Chatham Raiford	7	6	Monroe		
Lucky, John	Richmond Palmer	21	12	Monroe		
Luker, Wm orp	Walton Gilder	189	14	Monroe		
Lunders, Eliz wd	Lincoln Graves	55	9	Monroe	Pike County	
Lunsford, John	Ogleth Bowles	221	9	Monroe	Pike County	
Lyle, Hugh G	Wilkes Freeman	181	4	Monroe	Butts Co.	
Lynn, John	Columbia Hunt	120	2	Monroe	Pike County	Spalding Co.
Lynn, John	Warren Hubert	216	9	Monroe	Pike County	
Lyon, Andrew	Columbia Paynes	110	7	Monroe	Pike County	Lamar Co.
Lyon, Josiah M	Wilkes Johnson	180	11	Monroe	Pike County	Upson Co.
Lyon, Luther	Chatham Mills	52	15	Monroe	Pike County	Upson Co.
Lyons, Henry	Chatham Tebian	190	1	Monroe	Pike County	
Mabrey, Daniel	Wilkes Welborns	76	6	Monroe		
Macgarity, Kendrid	Elbert Merritts	40	10	Monroe	Pike County	Upson Co.
Mackin, John	Habersham McCrarey	23	11	Monroe	Pike County	Spalding Co.
Madden, David	Morgan Shepherd	109	9	Monroe	Pike County	
Maddin, John	Habersham McCrary	22	13	Monroe		
Maddox, Jos E	Greene Allen	164	9	Monroe	Pike County	
Maddox, Samuel	Jones Mullins	87	5	Monroe		
Maddox, Wm	Wilkes Moore	101	2	Monroe	Pike County	
Maddox, Wm	Wilkes Moore	165	5	Monroe		
Maddux, James	Putnam Brooks	13	4	Monroe		
Magby, Laban	Clarke Sorrell	178	10	Monroe	Pike County	Upson Co.
Magill, Charles	Camden Clarks	49	10	Monroe	Pike County	Upson Co.
McFarland, Dan'l C.	Columbia Wrights	235	13	Monroe	Bibb Co.	
McGauhey, Osburn	Jasper Whites	217	6	Monroe		
McGee, Jacob	Baldwin McGee's	8	15	Monroe	Pike County	Upson Co.
McGehee, William J.	Elbert Tatoms	92	12	Monroe		
McGinty, Thomas	Wilkinson Brooks	145	7	Monroe	Lamar Co.	
McGiobbony, James C.	Hancock Huffs	18	9	Monroe	Pike County	
McGlohon, Adam	Jefferson Halls	65	2	Monroe	Pike County	
McGlohon, Adam	Jefferson Halls	217	7	Monroe	Lamar Co.	
McGough, Margaret (Wid)	Jones Jeffersons	243	2	Monroe	Pike County	Spalding Co.
McGriff, Patrick	Pulaski Regans	182	8	Monroe	Pike County	
McGuire, Abner	Jackson Stricklands	137	10	Monroe	Pike County	Upson Co.
McHargue, James (Orps)	Greene Rankins	176	13	Monroe	Bibb Co.	
McIntire, John	Franklin S.Harris	63	12	Monroe		
McIntosh, David	Morgan Campbells	44	12	Monroe		
McIntosh, Persianna (Orp)	McIntosh 271 Dist.	37	9	Monroe	Pike County	
McKay, Hugh	Hall Wallaces	201	6	Monroe		
McKee, Richard, Jr.	Clarke Burdells	195	11	Monroe	Pike County	Upson Co.
McKee, Thomas	Jones Flowers	124	13	Monroe		
McKenzie, Daniel, Sr.	Montgomery Adams	110	12	Monroe		
McKenzie, Henry	Lincoln Parkers	40	14	Monroe	Butts Co.	
McKinley, Silas	Morgan Shaws	143	8	Monroe	Pike County	
McKinney, Benj.	Fayette Houston	14	9	Monroe	Pike County	
McKinney, Jean	Baldwin McGees	33	5	Monroe		
McKinnon, Rodrick W.	Chatham DeLyons	100	8	Monroe	Pike County	
McKinsey, Daniel Sr.	Montgomery Adams	143	2	Monroe	Pike County	Spalding Co.
McKinstry, Alexander	Richmond Lamars	234	13	Monroe	Bibb Co.	
McKinzie, Daniel, Jr.	Montgomery Adams	152	10	Monroe	Pike County	Upson Co.
McKissack, John	Putnam Johnsons	233	7	Monroe	Lamar Co.	
McKneely, James	Gwinnett Bridges	37	1	Monroe	Pike County	Spalding Co.
McLain, Ephraim	Gwinnett Tippins	135	2	Monroe	Pike County	
McLarney, John	Morgan Youngs	145	4	Monroe	Butts Co.	
McLenan, Margaret (Wid)	Pulaski Dewitts	241	7	Monroe	Lamar Co.	
McLendon, Frances	Wilkes Slacks	11	10	Monroe	Pike County	Upson Co.
McLendon, Frances (Wid)	Putnam Sanders	169	7	Monroe	Lamar Co.	
McLeod, Elizabeth (Wid)	Chatham Thiess	176	7	Monroe	Lamar Co.	
McLeod, Isabella (Wid)	Chatham DeLyons	92	2	Monroe	Pike County	
McLerun, Archibald	Chatham Reids	135	5	Monroe		
McLoud, Daniel	Jones Phillips	106	15	Monroe	Pike County	Upson Co.
McLoud, Hugh	Jones Phillips	40	3	Monroe	Pike County	
McMahan, Levi	Morgan Wagnons	207	13	Monroe	Bibb Co.	
McMekin, Nathaniel	Wilkes Coopers	173	1	Monroe	Pike County	
McMillin, Micajah	Greene Scotts	224	13	Monroe		
McMurray, Wm.	Wilkinson Lees	107	13	Monroe	Bibb Co.	
McNair, Martin	Richmond Palmers	19	7	Monroe	Pike County	Lamar Co.
McNeel, Wm.	Morgan Harpers	148	12	Monroe		
McNeil, Henry	Hall Hammons	203	8	Monroe	Pike County	
McNeil, Jesse	Columbia Griffins	85	12	Monroe		
McNeil, Sam'l	Jefferson Halls	75	5	Monroe		
McNeil, Thos. (Orp)	Morgan Fitzpatricks	80	3	Monroe	Pike County	Spalding Co.
McPherson, Martin	Jones Phillips	167	13	Monroe	Bibb Co.	
McSwain, Daniel	Washington Williams	64	1	Monroe	Pike County	Spalding Co.
McSwain, Hiram	Morgan Whitakers	101	15	Monroe	Pike County	Upson Co.
McTyre, Robert	Putnam Johnsons	163	7	Monroe	Lamar Co.	
McVean, John (Rev.)	Liberty Frasers	142	13	Monroe		
McWhorter, John, Sr.	Oglethorpe Jewells	169	1	Monroe	Pike County	
Meadows, Jacob, Jr.	Oglethorpe 235th	38	12	Monroe		
Meadows, Miles R.	Putnam Hendricks	78	10	Monroe	Pike County	Upson Co.
Meazels, Noah	Appling Westers	106	2	Monroe	Pike County	Spalding Co.
Meddows, George	Early Hairs	59	14	Monroe		
Medlin, James	Greene Allens	74	8	Monroe	Pike County	Lamar Co.
Meek, Reddon	Eamnuel Olivers	268	12	Monroe		
Meeks, Archibald	Gwinnett Bridges	90	10	Monroe	Pike County	Upson Co.
Meeks, Blany	Gwinnett Davis	66	4	Monroe		
Meeks, Littleberry	Gwinnett Davis	147	4	Monroe	Butts Co.	
Megges, William	Jasper Whites	198	15	Monroe	Pike County	Upson Co.
Melbourne, Arnold	Jones Bowins	156	15	Monroe	Pike County	Upson Co.
Menyard, Elizabeth (Wid)	Jackson Fulchers	168	12	Monroe		
Mercer, John (Orps)	Chatham Mills	272	10	Monroe	Pike County	Upson Co.
Mercer, Mount M.	Oglethorpe Jewells	81	6	Monroe		
Meridith, Segnal	Franklin Seals	58	6	Monroe		
Meriwether, Thos.	Clarke Harpers	118	1	Monroe	Pike County	Spalding Co.
Merrida, John (Orps)	Wilkes Welborns	65	13	Monroe		
Merrill, Caleb	Chatham Thiess	91	6	Monroe		
Merritt, Lemuel	McIntosh	86	10	Monroe	Pike County	Upson Co.
Merritt, Mickleberry	Morgan Fitzpatricks	256	10	Monroe	Pike County	Upson Co.
Messer, Henry	Laurens Stevens	134	2	Monroe	Pike County	
Methvin, Thomas	Twiggs Tysons	38	13	Monroe		
Mewborn, John	Oglethorpe, Cardwells	119	2	Monroe	Pike County	Spalding Co.
Michel, Robert Jr.	Franklin Tates	33	7	Monroe	Pike County	Lamar Co.
Michel, Wiley M.	Franklin Harris	87	13	Monroe		
Michell, John	McIntosh 21st Dist.	30	10	Monroe	Pike County	Upson Co.
Middleton, John	Washington Currys	216	2	Monroe	Pike County	Spalding Co.
Midleton, Wm.	McIntosh 24th Dist	230	12	Monroe		
Miles, William Jr.	Baldwin McGees	150	13	Monroe		
Milican, Hugh	Jones Haws	235	2	Monroe	Pike County	Spalding Co.
Millar, Samuel (Orp)	Pulaski Robinsons	42	12	Monroe		
Miller, Burwell	Hall Cotters	4	1	Monroe	Pike County	Spalding Co.
Miller, Daniel, Jr.	Laurens McClendons	252	15	Monroe	Pike County	Upson Co.
Miller, Richard	Hall Cotters	90	12	Monroe		
Miller, Andrew (Orps)	Putnam Morelands	102	12	Monroe		
Miller, Jacob	Chatham Mills	120	5	Monroe		
Miller, Jerome	Jackson Hansons	114	15	Monroe	Pike County	Upson Co.
Miller, Joel (Orps)	Madison Griffiths	163	5	Monroe		
Miller, Jonathan	Appling Westers	231	12	Monroe		
Miller, Robert	Jacksion Knoxs	89	7	Monroe	Pike County	Lamar Co.
Millican, Elijah	Madison Stricklands	267	11	Monroe	Pike County	Upson Co.
Millican, Bethua (Wid)	Wilkinson Brooks	67	9	Monroe	Pike County	
Millions, Henry	Putnam Hendricks	132	4	Monroe	Butts Co.	
Millions, Henry	Putnam Hendricks	241	6	Monroe		
Millirons, Sollomon	Putnam Leggets	39	10	Monroe	Pike County	Upson Co.
Mills, Berry	Burke Sapps	191	1	Monroe	Pike County	
Milner, Pitt	Jones Haws	190	9	Monroe	Pike County	
Mims, Joseph	Wilkinson Mims	109	7	Monroe	Pike County	Lamar Co.
Mims, Lawder	Wilkinson Mims	74	2	Monroe	Pike County	Spalding Co.
Minchew, Thomas	Gwinnet Ellisons	268	11	Monroe	Pike County	Upson Co.
Miner, Mary (Wid)	Baldwin Whites	52	7	Monroe	Pike County	Lamar Co.
Minish, Hardy	Franklin Ramsays	179	12	Monroe		
Minshen, Aron	Twiggs Chains	47	15	Monroe	Pike County	Upson Co.
Minter, Abner H.	Jones Greshams	12	15	Monroe	Pike County	Upson Co.
Minton, Abner H.	Jones Greshams	43	4	Monroe		
Minton, Mills	Hancock Johnsons	201	11	Monroe	Pike County	Upson Co.
Mitcalf, Azel	Jones Permenters	2	8	Monroe	Pike County	Lamar Co.
Mitcalf, Azel	Jones Permenters	234	11	Monroe	Pike County	Upson Co.
Mitchell, Mathew	Morgan Shaws	70	13	Monroe		
Mitchell, George	Morgan Talbots	63	10	Monroe	Pike County	Upson Co.
Mitchell, William	Jones Rossers	115	4	Monroe	Butts Co.	
Mixen, Michel	Burke Tuttles	110	2	Monroe	Pike County	Spalding Co.
Mize, Henry	Habersham, Ritches	178	4	Monroe	Butts Co.	
Mize, Frederick	Habersham Ritches	197	9	Monroe	Pike County	
Mizell, William	Jones, Hansford	13	15	Monroe	Pike County	Upson Co.
Mobley, William	Jasper Whites	247	9	Monroe	Pike County	
Mobley, Lemuel	Liberty McCranies	198	8	Monroe	Pike County	
Mobley, Sarah W.	Washington Mills	227	4	Monroe	Butts Co.	
Mock, George	Jefferson Connells	157	8	Monroe	Pike County	
Moddenberry, John	Bulloch Denmarks	167	7	Monroe	Lamar Co.	
Molloy, Joseph M.	Oglethorpe Cardwells	38	6	Monroe		
Moman, William	Putnam Jurnigans	55	1	Monroe	Pike County	Spalding Co.
Moncrieff, Isaac	Greene Schotts	10	3	Monroe	Pike County	Spalding Co.
Monk, Malor	Appling Westers	165	3	Monroe	Lamar Co.	
Monk, Silas	Columbia Shaws	98	5	Monroe		
Monroe, David	Burke McCullers	189	4	Monroe	Butts Co.	
Monroe, John	Jefferson Dodds	88	15	Monroe	Pike County	Upson Co.
Monroe, Jane (Wid)	Montgomery Adams	82	10	Monroe	Pike County	Upson Co.
Monroe, Malcom	Montgomery	139	7	Monroe	Lamar Co.	
Montford, William	Laurens Smiths	14	10	Monroe	Pike County	Upson Co.
Montgomery, James	Twiggs Chains	73	15	Monroe	Pike County	Upson Co.
Montgomery, James H.	Jasper Johns	54	1	Monroe	Pike County	Spalding Co.
Montgomery, Lewis	Washington Riddles	150	1	Monroe	Pike County	
Moody, Isaac	Appling Boyds	237	4	Monroe	Butts Co.	
Moody, John	Greene Winfields	30	8	Monroe	Pike County	Lamar Co.
Moon, Stephen	Elbert Christians	113	3	Monroe	Pike County	Spalding Co.
Moor, Jason Jr.	Wilkinson Mims	73	5	Monroe		
Moore, Joseph W.	Morgan Youngs	53	5	Monroe		
Moore, Morris (Orps)	Baldwin Doles	131	8	Monroe	Pike County	
Moore, Thomas	Clarke Browns	167	6	Monroe		
Moore, Wm. H	Morgan Whitaker	175	6	Monroe		
Moore, Ann (Wid)	Emanuel Jordens	146	4	Monroe	Butts Co.	
Moore, Francis (Son/F.)	Oglethorpe Goldings	237	10	Monroe	Pike County	Upson Co.
Moore, Jacamiah	Greene Allens	101	5	Monroe		
Moore, John	Elbert Smiths	43	1	Monroe	Pike County	Spalding Co.
Moore, John	Washington Robinsons	233	1	Monroe	Pike County	
Moore, John	Jasper Pollards	130	2	Monroe	Pike County	
Moore, John R.	Jones Greshams	138	9	Monroe	Pike County	
Moore, Mary (Wid)	Baldwin Doles	203	4	Monroe	Butts Co.	
Moore, Sarah (Orp)	Greene Winfields	1	5	Monroe		
Moore, Sarah (Wid)	Columbia Hunts	104	4	Monroe	Butts Co.	
Moore, Spencer	Baldwin Haws	145	12	Monroe		
Moore, Stephen W.	Camden Clarks	242	8	Monroe	Pike County	
Morcock, Elizabeth (Wid)	Bryan Demeres	253	15	Monroe	Pike County	Upson Co.
Morel, Bryan N.	Chatham Rowells	164	10	Monroe	Pike County	Upson Co.
Moreland, Thomas	Jasper Whites	254	9	Monroe	Pike County	
Moreland, Wood	Jasper 293 Dist.	50	12	Monroe		
Morgan, George S. (orp)	Richmond Warnes	141	13	Monroe		
Morgan, Bithal	Madison Strickland	100	7	Monroe	Pike County	Lamar Co.
Morgan, David (Orps)	Warren Travis	255	7	Monroe		
Morgan, Elihue	Appline Boyds	8	4	Monroe		
Morgan, Nancy (Wid)	Morgan Lawsons	22	10	Monroe	Pike County	Upson Co.
Morgan, Nicholas	Camden Clarks	61	9	Monroe	Pike County	
Morgan, David (Orps)	Screven Conners	122	9	Monroe	Pike County	
Morray, Drury	Laurens, Coats	202	10	Monroe	Pike County	Upson Co.
Morrell, Thomas	Laurens, Mathers	37	6	Monroe		
Morris, Isaac	Jasper Barnes	5	1	Monroe	Pike County	Spalding Co.
Morris, Nathaniel	Jones Burkhalters	3	11	Monroe	Lamar Co.	
Morris, Richard	Jones Burklters	102	2	Monroe	Pike County	
Morris, Thomas W.	Jones Burkhalters	129	6	Monroe		
Morris, Thomas, Jr.	Jasper Pollards	144	3	Monroe		
Morris, William	Hall Carnes	76	2	Monroe	Pike County	Spalding Co.
Morris, James S.	Jasper Wallis	85	4	Monroe		
Morris, John	Putnam Morelands	76	3	Monroe	Pike County	Spalding Co.
Morris, Richard (Orps)	Lincoln Blalocks	86	3	Monroe	Pike County	Spalding Co.
Morris, Sarah (Wid)	Warren Blounts	14	4	Monroe		
Morris, Taylor	Jones Jeffersons	225	15	Monroe	Pike County	Upson Co.
Morris, Thomas	Walton Williams	229	10	Monroe	Pike County	Upson Co.
Morris, Thomas (Orps)	Columbia Cochrans	26	12	Monroe		
Morris, Thomas I.	Morgan Campbells	53	14	Monroe	Butts Co.	
Morrison, Archibald	Montgomery Adams	70	7	Monroe	Pike County	Lamar Co.
Morrison, James	Elbert Olivers	165	1	Monroe	Pike County	
Morriss, Essac (Orps)	Morgan Fitzpatricks	136	15	Monroe	Pike County	Upson Co.
Morton, Silas	Screven Conners	234	2	Monroe	Pike County	Spalding Co.
Morton, Wm. M.	Oglethorpe Cardwells	146	13	Monroe		
Moseley, Samuel G.	Walton Gilders	70	8	Monroe	Pike County	Lamar Co.
Moseley, Thos (Orps)	Putnam Sanders	18	5	Monroe		
Mosley, Isaiah	Twiggs Thames	67	6	Monroe		
Moss, William	Elbert Smiths	14	6	Monroe		
Mott, Uriah	Wilkinson Brooks	189	10	Monroe	Pike County	Upson Co.
Moulder, Jacob	Franklin Hoopers	46	3	Monroe	Pike County	Spalding Co.
Moy, John	Hancock Swints	120	1	Monroe	Pike County	Spalding Co.
Moyd, George Jr.	Columbia Colliers	46	4	Monroe		
Moye, James	Washington Whitfields	13	14	Monroe	Butts Co.	
Mozely, I. E.	Rabun Millers	102	9	Monroe	Pike County	
Mulkey, David	Habersham Taylors	266	11	Monroe	Pike County	Upson Co.
Mulkey, Isaac	Burke Powells	58	13	Monroe		
Mullens, Nancy (Wid)	Jasper Barnes	223	3	Monroe	Lamar Co.	
Mullins, William	Hall McCutchens	54	6	Monroe		
Mulryen, Thomas H.	Chatham Mills	236	12	Monroe		
Muncrief, Sterling	richmond Winters	93	4	Monroe	Butts Co.	
Murcuson, John	Washington Barges	110	6	Monroe		
Murphey, Cornelius	Baldwin McCrarys	47	9	Monroe	Pike County	
Murphey, William (Orps)	Hancock Kendaklls	6	15	Monroe	Pike County	Upson Co.
Murray, Stephen (Orps)	Burke Sapps	144	10	Monroe	Pike County	Upson Co.
Murry, Daniel	Burke Sapps	124	2	Monroe	Pike County	
Murry, William	Liberty Fraziers	21	9	Monroe	Pike County	
Musick, John S.	Jefferson Smiths	107	5	Monroe		
Myers, Jane (Wid)	Chtham Mills	140	12	Monroe		
Myers, John	Hall Brooks	129	7	Monroe	Lamar Co.	
Myhand, Jesse	Morgan Fitzpatrick	85	10	Monroe	Pike County	Upson Co.
Nance, Catharine (Wid)	Columbia Wrights	174	15	Monroe	Pike County	Upson Co.
Nance, John	Clark Wells	39	4	Monroe		
Napper, Drewry	Effingham 13th	187	6	Monroe		
Narramore, Eli W.	Hall Carnes	232	8	Monroe	Pike County	
Narsworthy, Ogburn	Burke Lodges	74	1	Monroe	Pike County	Spalding Co.
Nash, Reuben	Wilkes Johnsons	245	12	Monroe		
Neal, Richard L.	Franklin S. Harris	4	15	Monroe	Pike County	Upson Co.
Neal, Tabitha (Wid)	Franklin Ramseys	48	2	Monroe	Pike County	Spalding Co.
Neely, Henry	Morgan Wagnons	10	7	Monroe	Pike County	Lamar Co.
Neesmith, Charles R.	Burke McKays	340	13	Monroe	Bibb Co.	
Neetles, William	Liberty Frasers	5	6	Monroe		
Nelms, Jonathan	Elbert Hannas	89	11	Monroe		
Nelson, John W.	Morgan Youngs	179	10	Monroe	Pike County	Upson Co.
Nelson, Wade	Wilkinson Williams	113	10	Monroe	Pike County	Upson Co.
Newberry, John	Jones Bowins	247	10	Monroe	Pike County	Upson Co.
Newsom, Amon	Columbia Cochrans	89	5	Monroe		
Newsom, Benajah	Laurens Smiths	243	12	Monroe		
Newsom, Daniel W.	Warren Hutchinsons	55	11	Monroe		
Newsom, David A.	Greene Greers	216	7	Monroe	Lamar Co.	
Newsom, John	Morgan Harris's	192	5	Monroe		
Newton, Daniel	Washington Eckles	65	7	Monroe	Pike County	Lamar Co.
Nicholas, Virgin	Elbert Burdens	252	8	Monroe	Pike County	
Nicholass, Samuel	Chatham Raifords	56	4	Monroe		
Nichols, Julius	Franklin Ramseys	185	13	Monroe		
Nickelson, George P.	Greene Gregorys	232	10	Monroe	Pike County	Upson Co.
Nicks, John	Early Hairs	126	11	Monroe	Lamar Co.	
Nicolan, Barnard	Glynn Mannings	98	9	Monroe	Pike County	
Nisbit, Samuel S.	Wilkinson Mimms	262	9	Monroe	Pike County	
Nix, George	Madison Powells	15	11	Monroe		
Nix, Joseph	Franklin Eddins	82	3	Monroe	Pike County	Spalding Co.
Nix, Mary	Camden Browns	41	8	Monroe	Pike County	Lamar Co.
Nix, William (Orps)	Pulaski Lanairs	163	3	Monroe	Lamar Co.	
Noble, Lithea (Orps)	Chatham Mills	123	5	Monroe		
Nobles, Jesse	Laurens Coats	215	3	Monroe	Lamar Co.	
Noell, John C.	Oglethorpe 235th	88	3	Monroe	Pike County	Spalding Co.
Nolley, Daniel	Wilkinson Minms	211	4	Monroe	Butts Co.	
Norman, James	Appling Westers	17	5	Monroe		
Norrill, Wm. Sr.	Greene Nelms	198	7	Monroe	Lamar Co.	
Norris, James	Hancock Loyds	184	4	Monroe	Butts Co.	
Norris, Josiah	Camden Clarks	214	9	Monroe	Pike County	
Norsworthy, James	Hancock Mattocks	256	6	Monroe		
North, Abraham	Oglethorpe Holtclaws	47	13	Monroe		
Northcut, Robert	Habersham "Flanagan	101	3	Monroe	Pike County	
Northington, Benjamin	Oglethorpe Bowls	59	8	Monroe	Pike County	Lamar Co.
Norton, Isaac	Chatham Mills	53	15	Monroe	Pike County	Upson Co.
Nowlin, Sherrod	Jackson Hansons	47	2	Monroe	Pike County	Spalding Co.
Nungazer, Nathanl	Chatham Rowells	260	10	Monroe	Pike County	Upson Co.
Nunnelee, Walter Sr.	Elbert Tatoms	71	13	Monroe		
Nutt, Jane (Wid)	Morgan Campbells	59	5	Monroe		
O'Bryan, Lewis Sr.	Scriven Mills	11	12	Monroe		
Odom, Winbourn	Putnam Tomlinson	130	9	Monroe	Pike County	
Odom, Elkanah	Columbia Wrights	196	13	Monroe	Bibb Co.	
Odum, Laban	Burke Powells	199	10	Monroe	Pike County	Upson Co.
Offutt, Obedience (Wid)	Columbia Bealls	114	6	Monroe		
Oglesby, Lindsey	Elbert Christians	36	6	Monroe		
Olive, Thomas	Columbia Cochrans	203	3	Monroe		
Oliver, Andrew	Greene Greers	56	10	Monroe	Pike County	Upson Co.
Oliver, Georgie	Tatnall Padgets	156	2	Monroe	Pike County	
Oliver, Peter	Elbert Olivers	164	11	Monroe	Pike County	Upson Co.
Oliver, Thomas W	Scriven Bests	84	1	Monroe	Pike County	Spalding Co.
Olmstead, Robert	Chatham Thiefs	83	8	Monroe	Pike County	Lamar Co.
O'Neil, Martha (Orph)	McIntosh 271 Dist.	198	13	Monroe	Bibb Co.	
Oree, Abagel (Orph)	Chatham Mills	259	10	Monroe	Pike County	Upson Co.
Orton, John	Chatham Thiefs	125	2	Monroe	Pike County	
Orvis, Edwin (Orph)	Chatham Thiefs	97	11	Monroe	Lamar Co.	
Orvis, Emily (Orph)	Chatham Thiefs	97	11	Monroe	Lamar Co.	
Osgood, Rebecca (Wid)	Liberty Mells	34	8	Monroe	Pike County	Lamar Co.
Oslin, Isaac	Greene Wodhams	219	1	Monroe	Pike County	
Osteen, John	Camden Bates	224	2	Monroe	Pike County	Lamar Co.
Osteen, Sarah (Wid)	McInthos 24 Dist.	245	11	Monroe	Pike County	Upson Co.
Otwell, James	Hall Millerss	209	10	Monroe	Pike County	Upson Co.
Outlaw, Alex	Emanuel Olivers	205	11	Monroe	Pike County	
Outlaw, Edward Sr.	Emanuel Olivers	168	9	Monroe	Pike County	
Owens, John	Elbert Terrells	93	13	Monroe		
Pace, Mathew J.	Oglethorpe Huffs	20	6	Monroe		
Pace, Samuel D	Oglethorpe Cardwells	12	8	Monroe	Pike County	Lamar Co.
Padget, Elijah	Tattnall Padgetts	135	9	Monroe	Pike County	
Padget, John R.	Tattnall Padgets	175	13	Monroe	Bibb Co.	
Padget, John Sr.	Tattnall Padgets	63	3	Monroe	Pike County	
Padgets, John (Orps)	Jones Huffs	205	8	Monroe	Pike County	
Padgets, Hopkins	Tattnall Padgets	232	2	Monroe	Pike County	Lamar Co.
Palmer, Martin, Jr.	Glynn Mannings	200	9	Monroe	Pike County	
Palmere, Elisha	Lincoln Levretts	115	7	Monroe	Pike County	Lamar Co.
Parham, Jones A.	Putnam Johnsons	211	1	Monroe	Pike County	
Parham, Mathew A.	Baldwin Doles	143	6	Monroe		
Parish, William	Camden Bates	107	7	Monroe	Pike County	Lamar Co.
Park, John (Orps)	Twiggs Halls	147	10	Monroe	Pike County	Upson Co.
Parker, Drury (Orps)	Twiggs Blackshears	104	2	Monroe	Pike County	
Parker, Jesse (Orps)	Wilkes Moores	99	8	Monroe	Pike County	
Parker, John	Putnam Walkers	9	7	Monroe	Pike County	Lamar Co.
Parker, John	Warren Jones	37	14	Monroe	Butts Co.	
Parker, Miles	Jasper Johns	69	4	Monroe		
Parker, Nancy (Wid)	Twiggs Blackshears	178	7	Monroe	Lamar Co.	
Parker, Nancy (Wid)	Twiggs Blackshears	134	12	Monroe		
Parker, Sarah (Wid	Jackson Spruces	145	8	Monroe	Pike County	
Parker, Wm. H	Liberty McCranies	167	10	Monroe	Pike County	Upson Co.
Parkes, Samuel C.	Jasper Thorntons	26	1	Monroe	Pike County	Spalding Co.
Parks, John D. T.	Jasper Burneys	8	7	Monroe	Pike County	Lamar Co.
Parmer, George W	Twiggs Chains	161	13	Monroe		
Parmer, John	Jackson Scotts	27	12	Monroe		
Parramore, John E	Early Reids	124	6	Monroe		
Parridiss, John	Jones Permenters	223	9	Monroe	Pike County	
Parridy, John	Jones Permenters	244	2	Monroe	Pike County	Spalding Co.
Parrish, Harris (Orp/Thos)	Walton Wagnons	81	11	Monroe		
Parrish, Moses	Hancock Claytons	7	13	Monroe		
Parrish, Rhody	Greene Talleys	248	1	Monroe	Pike County	
Parrish, Allen	Camden Bates	2	9	Monroe	Pike County	
Parson, Anson	Chatham DeLyons	201	10	Monroe	Pike County	Upson Co.
Parsons, Patsey (Orph)	Jefferson Smiths	31	2	Monroe	Pike County	
Partin, Stephen	Tattnall Padgetts	44	1	Monroe	Pike County	Spalding Co.
Partridge, James	Jones Greshams	137	8	Monroe	Pike County	
Partridge, James	Jones Greshams	224	10	Monroe	Pike County	Upson Co.
Paskell, Thomas	Lincoln Graves	180	2	Monroe	Pike County	Spalding Co.
Pasmore, John	Twiggs McCrarys	181	10	Monroe	Pike County	Upson Co.
Pass, John Sr.	Oglethorpe Huffs	88	15	Monroe	Pike County	Upson Co.
Pate, David D.	Warren Blunts	302	13	Monroe	Bibb Co.	
Pate, John	Walton Richs	2	1	Monroe	Pike County	Spalding Co.
Pate, John	Warren Williams	104	15	Monroe	Pike County	Upson Co.
Pate, Robert W.	Jefferson Halls	162	7	Monroe	Lamar Co.	
Paterage, Hartwell	Washington Wimberlys	219	7	Monroe	Lamar Co.	
Patillo, John	Morgan Shaws	186	10	Monroe	Pike County	Upson Co.
Patterson, Douglas J.M.C.	Morgan Harpers	211	8	Monroe	Pike County	
Patterson, Henry	Franklin Ramseys	40	6	Monroe		
Patterson, Josiah (Orph)	Jefferson Fountains	48	13	Monroe		
Patterson, Thomas M	Jefferson Woldons	13	12	Monroe		
Patterson, William	Hancock Kendalls	103	8	Monroe	Pike County	
Pattishall, Richard C	Jones Jefferson	116	2	Monroe	Pike County	Spalding Co.
Patton, Benjamin	Oglethorpe Huffs	38	14	Monroe	Butts Co.	
Patton, Joseph	Twiggs Blackshears	9	6	Monroe		
Patton, Samuel	Oglethorpe Huffs	109	3	Monroe	Pike County	Spalding Co.
Payne, William	Glynn Burnetts	80	9	Monroe	Pike County	
Peacock, Bryan	Pulaski Regans	172	9	Monroe	Pike County	
Peacock, Cullins	Laurens Miltons	186	8	Monroe	Pike County	
Peacock, Daniel	Jasper Pollards	208	6	Monroe		
Peacock, Eli (Wid)	Bulloch Deloachs	31	13	Monroe		
Peacock, Hannah (Wid)	Liberty Mells	154	11	Monroe	Pike County	Upson Co.
Peacock, Jonathan	Washington Jenkins	185	9	Monroe	Pike County	
Peacocok, Kinchen	Pulaski Robinsons	86	5	Monroe		
Pearce, Elijah	Twiggs Houses	237	8	Monroe	Pike County	
Pearce, Green D	Scriven Douglass	35	7	Monroe	Pike County	Lamar Co.
Pearce, Jonathan	Columbia Gartrells	5	12	Monroe		
Pearche, Jacob Sr.	Twiggs Chains	210	10	Monroe	Pike County	Upson Co.
Pearson, Wenlock C.	Wilkinson Williams	147	6	Monroe		
Pearson, Winney	Twiggs Thames	168	1	Monroe	Pike County	
Peek, Charles	Greene Greers	194	3	Monroe	Lamar Co.	
Peel, David B.	Jasper Newtons	156	12	Monroe		
Peeler, Benjamin	Elbert Penns	20	7	Monroe	Pike County	Lamar Co.
Peeples, Bejamin M	Morgan Sheppards	65	15	Monroe	Pike County	Upson Co.
Peevey, Eli	Jasper 365 Dist	220	1	Monroe	Pike County	
Pellegreen, John	Chatham	231	2	Monroe	Pike County	Lamar Co.
Pellum, Edward	Walton Davis	84	15	Monroe	Pike County	Upson Co.
Pendivis, William	Wayne Oneils	172	6	Monroe		
Pendivis, William	Wayne Oneils	81	15	Monroe	Pike County	Upson Co.
Penney, Theophilus	Twiggs Batemans	78	6	Monroe		
Pepper, Daniel P	Jones Coxs	26	14	Monroe	Butts Co.	
Perdiview, John D	Wilkinson Mims	236	13	Monroe	Bibb Co.	
Perham, John	Jasper Phillips	77	9	Monroe	Pike County	
Perkins, Allen	Burke Tutles	101	10	Monroe	Pike County	Upson Co.
Perkins, Edward	Wilkes Bryants	203	2	Monroe	Pike County	Spalding Co.
Perkins, Henry D., Jr	Wilkes Bryants	232	6	Monroe		
Perkins, Isaac	Laurens Coats	83	10	Monroe	Pike County	Upson Co.
Perkins, Thomas (Orps)	Twiggs Blackshears	120	12	Monroe		
Perkins, William	Burke Powells	186	6	Monroe		
Perkins, William	Morgan Campbells	62	9	Monroe	Pike County	
Perrin, George	Elbert Olivers	119	7	Monroe	Pike County	Lamar Co.
Perry, Amos P.	Baldwin Doles	86	12	Monroe		
Perry, Burril	Columbia Fews	14	8	Monroe	Pike County	Lamar Co.
Perry, James L. (Orps)	Jasper Johns	63	2	Monroe	Pike County	
Perry, James L. (Orps)	Laurens Smiths	80	4	Monroe		
Perry, Jesse	Columbia Wrights	267	12	Monroe		
Perry, Jetson	Baldwin McCrarys	191	11	Monroe	Pike County	Upson Co.
Perry, Sollomon	Baldwin Malcolms	15	13	Monroe		
Persons, Rachel (Wid)	Warren Blunts	280	13	Monroe	Bibb Co.	
Persons, Thomas	Putnam Coopers	241	1	Monroe	Pike County	
Pertilla, Narcessa (Orph)	Baldwin Whites	223	11	Monroe	Pike County	Upson Co.
Peryman, Anthony A	Elebert Ruckers	64	5	Monroe		
Pesley, James	Jackson Flanagans	28	10	Monroe	Pike County	Upson Co.
Peters, John L.	Walton Gilders	126	13	Monroe		
Peters, Wm. Sr.	Twiggs Tysons	36	1	Monroe	Pike County	Spalding Co.
Pettree, Simon	Wilkes Coopers	99	7	Monroe	Pike County	Lamar Co.
Pettus, Charles	Wilkes Willis	136	1	Monroe	Pike County	
Pettus, Stephen G.	Wilkes Willis	223	1	Monroe	Pike County	
Petty, John	Morgan Hendersons	162	11	Monroe	Pike County	Upson Co.
Petty, Luke	Jones Cabaniss	226	3	Monroe	Lamar Co.	
Peugh, Asa	Jasper Martins	12	2	Monroe	Pike County	Spalding Co.
Pew, Isass	Jackson Stricklands	7	15	Monroe	Pike County	Upson Co.
Phelps, William	Jones Pitts	2	14	Monroe		
Phillips, Bartholonew (Orph)	Morgan Harpers	116	8	Monroe	Pike County	
Phillips, Edmund	Putnam Cowles	66	14	Monroe	Butts Co.	
Phillips, Elizabeth (Orph)	Richmond Burtons	42	11	Monroe		
Phillips, Ephm (Orph)	Richmond Burtons	42	11	Monroe		
Phillips, Hardy	Morgan Campbells	197	15	Monroe	Pike County	Upson Co.
Phillips, Henry R.	Jasper Ryans	10	11	Monroe		
Phillips, John h	Camden Scotts	217	5	Monroe		
Phillips, Jonathan	Wilkes Josseys	52	6	Monroe		
Phillips, Robert	Morgan Shaws	191	15	Monroe	Pike County	Upson Co.
Phillips, Singleton	Morgan Shaws	153	15	Monroe	Pike County	Upson Co.
Phillips, William	Jasper Dist 365	211	12	Monroe		
Phinessee, Hiram	Hall McCutcheons	59	6	Monroe		
Phinesy, Jacob	Oglethorpe Jewells	245	1	Monroe	Pike County	
Pick, Ira	Twiggs Griffins	137	7	Monroe	Lamar Co.	
Pierce, Allen	Burke Lodges	175	3	Monroe		
Pierce, Eliz. (Orph)	Burke Powells	113	6	Monroe		
Pierce, George W.	Burke Powerlls	114	8	Monroe	Pike County	
Pierce, John	Jasper Whites	22	4	Monroe		
Pierce, Thomas	Wilkinson Pierces	44	13	Monroe		
Piggot, Abner	Wilkes Willis	177	3	Monroe		
Pike, Mary (Wid)	Putnam Bledsoes	215	12	Monroe		
Pine, Tamsey T. (Wid)	Baldwin Husons	124	4	Monroe	Butts Co.	
Pines, Catharine	Greene Scotts	97	5	Monroe		
Pior, John	Burke Dillards	38	7	Monroe	Pike County	Lamar Co.
Piper, John F.	Walton Kobbs	11	8	Monroe	Pike County	Lamar Co.
Pitman, Pharmariah	Washington Morrisons	103	3	Monroe	Pike County	Spalding Co.
Pitman, Phillip	Wilkinson Brooks	31	7	Monroe	Pike County	Lamar Co.
Pittard, Samuel	Clark Davis	39	14	Monroe	Butts Co.	
Pledger, Johnson S.	Elb Upshaws	74	4	Monroe		
Poe, James W.	Habersham Suttons	69	5	Monroe		
Pollack, Lewis	Twiggs Batemans	51	14	Monroe	Butts Co.	
Pollard, Pugh	Bulloch Denmarks	236	3	Monroe		
Pollard, Wm. (Orps)	Oglethorpe Bowles	232	11	Monroe	Pike County	Upson Co.
Ponder, Hizekiah	Camden Browns	250	2	Monroe	Pike County	Lamar Co.
Ponder, Jesse	Morgan Wagnons	229	9	Monroe	Pike County	
Pool, David	Wilkes Bryants	177	2	Monroe	Pike County	Spalding Co.
Pool, John S.	Wilkes Callaways	91	5	Monroe		
Pool, Permela	Washington Morrisons	42	14	Monroe	Butts Co.	
Pope, John	Putnam Coopers	189	2	Monroe	Pike County	Lamar Co.
Poppell, George	Tattnall Padgets	61	1	Monroe	Pike County	Spalding Co.
Pork, John	Jackson Hansons	152	5	Monroe		
Porter, James	Effingham 12th Dist	73	13	Monroe		
Porter, William	Washington Morrisons	64	3	Monroe	Pike County	
Posey, Levi	Pulaski Lesters	205	6	Monroe		
Post, Samuel	Hall Buffington	54	5	Monroe		
Pouledge, Ephraim	Effingham 12th Dist	122	11	Monroe	Lamar Co.	
Pounds, MAry (Wid)	Gwinnett Dobbs	226	5	Monroe		
Powel, Hardy	Columbia Cochrans	83	7	Monroe	Pike County	Lamar Co.
Powel, James	Laurens Carsons	20	2	Monroe	Pike County	Spalding Co.
Powel, Robert	Wilkes Reeves	127	3	Monroe	Pike County	
Powell, Arthur (Orps)	Burke Cavenahs	4	14	Monroe		
Powell, Barnett R	Twiggs Blackshears	100	14	Monroe	Butts Co.	
Powell, Betsey (Wid)	Morgan Harriss	109	1	Monroe	Pike County	Spalding Co.
Powell, Elijah (Orph)	Burke Powells	45	7	Monroe	Pike County	Lamar Co.
Powell, John	Pulaski Roachs	198	5	Monroe		
Powell, Johnson	Jasper Shropshires	219	5	Monroe		
Powell, Levi (Orps)	Jackson Fulchers	53	12	Monroe		
Powell, Quinney	Twiggs Thames	5	7	Monroe	Pike County	Lamar Co.
Powell, Samuel	Fayette Houston	51	7	Monroe	Pike County	Lamar Co.
Powell, Samuel	Fayette Houston	34	12	Monroe		
Powell, Simeon	Morgan Shepherds	172	2	Monroe	Pike County	Spalding Co.
Powell, William	Twiggs Thames	114	3	Monroe	Pike County	Spalding Co.
Powledge, Phillip	Chatham DeLyons	41	14	Monroe	Butts Co.	
Pratt, James (Orps)	Wilkes Slacks	24	14	Monroe	Butts Co.	
Pratt, Thomas A.	Jones Bowins	22	8	Monroe	Pike County	Lamar Co.
Prescot, John	Warren Harriss	24	7	Monroe	Pike County	Lamar Co.
Prescot, John	Warren Harriss	80	12	Monroe		
Prescot, William Jr.	Burke Powells	169	12	Monroe		
Presley, Charles	Elbert Almonds	212	2	Monroe	Pike County	Spalding Co.
Presley, James	Jackson Flanagans	43	15	Monroe	Pike County	Upson Co.
Prewitt, Henry	Hancock Masons	225	11	Monroe	Pike County	Upson Co.
Price, Cader	Wilkinson Pierces	169	5	Monroe		
Price, James	Hall McCutcheons	43	11	Monroe		
Price, James E.	Greene Gregorys	1	11	Monroe	Lamar Co.	
Price, Jesse	Emanuel Chasons	234	12	Monroe		
Price, Joseph	Jackson Fulchers	263	13	Monroe	Bibb Co.	
Pridgen, James	Jasper Martins	258	15	Monroe	Pike County	Upson Co.
Prior, John	Burke Jourdans	148	5	Monroe		
Proctor, Starling	Franklin Harriss	138	1	Monroe	Pike County	
Prontier, Mary P(Wid)	Chatham Mills	73	2	Monroe	Pike County	Spalding Co.
Pruett, John T.	Columbia Cochrans	178	13	Monroe	Bibb Co.	
Pugh, Scintha (Orph)	Wilkinson Williams	113	13	Monroe		
Pullam, Richard	Putnam Brooks	156	7	Monroe	Lamar Co.	
Pullen, John	Hancock Masons	98	12	Monroe		
Purcell, John	Jackson Scotts	56	6	Monroe		
Purdew, William (Orps)	Franklin Burtons	275	15	Monroe	Pike County	Upson Co.
Purkins, Allen	Early Hairs	117	9	Monroe	Pike County	
Purkins, Rosanna (Wid)	Habersham Words	49	14	Monroe	Butts Co.	
Purkins, Wm.	Morgan Campbells	10	6	Monroe		
Purse, Thomas	Chatham DeLyons	64	7	Monroe	Pike County	Lamar Co.
Purvis, Edward (Orph)	Jefferson Connels	55	13	Monroe		
Purvis, Sarah (Orps)	Glynn Burnetts	80	8	Monroe	Pike County	Lamar Co.
Putnam, Hosey	Jasper Burneys	91	3	Monroe	Pike County	
Pye, Asa	Jasper Burneys	156	9	Monroe	Pike County	
Pye, Henry	Putnam Walkers	41	11	Monroe	Lamar Co.	
Pye, James	Oglethorpe Huffs -	157	13	Monroe		
Qual, Penal	Hall Buffingtons	55	15	Monroe	Pike County	Upson Co.
Quinn, Calvin	Mont McElveens	138	11	Monroe	Pike County	Upson Co.
Quinn, Mathew	Elbert Hanners	49	3	Monroe	Pike County	Spalding Co.
Rabuns, William (Orps)	Hancock Feens	58	3	Monroe	Pike County	
Radford, Wm	Chatham Thiefs	71	14	Monroe	Butts Co.	
Ragan, Buckner	Oglethorpe Bowles	226	10	Monroe	Pike County	Upson Co.
Ragan, William	Wilkinson Lees	252	11	Monroe	Pike County	Upson Co.
Ragland, Eve (Wid)	Wilkes Wellborns	188	11	Monroe	Pike County	Upson Co.
Rahn, Wm	Chatham Mills	133	11	Monroe	Lamar Co.	
Rain, William	Camden Baileys	105	7	Monroe	Pike County	Lamar Co.
Rainey, John	Telfair Robertsons	118	12	Monroe		
Rainey, Thomas F	Oglethorpe Thorntons	248	7	Monroe	Lamar Co.	
Rainey, William	Wilkes Johnsons	115	9	Monroe	Pike County	
Rals, Abraham	Hancock Johnsons	128	15	Monroe	Pike County	Upson Co.
Ramsey, Benj (Orps)	Laurens Coats	160	10	Monroe	Pike County	Upson Co.
Ramsey, George W	Jasper Martins	240	9	Monroe	Pike County	
Ramsey, Leonard	Franklin Ramseys	11	15	Monroe	Pike County	Upson Co.
Randolph, Robert	Columbia Fews	227	7	Monroe	Lamar Co.	
Ransom, John W.	Hancock Colemans	188	3	Monroe		
Rasco, Wm	Chatham Scotts	166	12	Monroe		
Ratcliff, Benjamin	Wayne	216	15	Monroe	Pike County	Upson Co.
Ratcliff, Moses	Jasper 365th Dist	150	8	Monroe	Pike County	
Ratliff, Richard	Wayne Langsters	274	13	Monroe	Bibb Co.	
Rawlison, George	Appling Bryans	184	11	Monroe	Pike County	
Rawls, Thomas	Bullock Hagins	151	4	Monroe	Butts Co.	
Ray, John	Madison Strickland	61	14	Monroe		
Ray, Reubin S.	Morgan Patricks	242	10	Monroe	Pike County	Upson Co.
Ray, Robert	Franklin Kettons	106	9	Monroe	Pike County	
Ray, Samuel W	Wilkes Mattoxs	254	8	Monroe	Pike County	
Readock, John	Camden Scotts	121	10	Monroe	Pike County	Upson Co.
Reaves, Jesse Jr.	Jones Flowers	236	7	Monroe	Lamar Co.	
Reaves, Lee	Hancock Swints	84	5	Monroe		
Reaves, William	Gwinnett Ellisons	44	14	Monroe		
Red, Bentley	Gwinnett Penleys	207	9	Monroe	Pike County	
Red, Berry	Richmond Luthers	68	12	Monroe		
Reddick, Jane Caroline (Orph)	Telfair Loves	184	6	Monroe		
Reddick, Lurain (Orph)	Telfair Loves	184	6	Monroe		
Redish, Drewry	Appling Newmans	135	8	Monroe	Pike County	
Redish, Samuel B	Walton Williams	175	1	Monroe	Pike County	
Reece, Julian (Orph)	Morgan Youngs	222	8	Monroe	Pike County	
Reece, Susannah (Wid)	Morgan Youngs	142	5	Monroe		
Reed, John	Columbia Hunts	193	13	Monroe		
Reefault, Mary (Wid)	Glynn Mannings	247	11	Monroe	Pike County	Upson Co.
Rees, Henry (Orph)	Morgan Brooks	16	13	Monroe		
Reese, Benjamin	Warren Williams	54	12	Monroe		
Reese, Joseph	Jones Greshams	220	6	Monroe		
Reese, Thomas	Oglethorpe Holtzclaws	221	7	Monroe	Lamar Co.	
Reese, Thomas	Oglethorpe Holtsclaws	244	10	Monroe	Pike County	Upson Co.
Reeve, Bejamin	Chatham DeLyons	170	10	Monroe	Pike County	Upson Co.
Reeves, Beriah B. (Capt)	Wilkes Reeves	188	4	Monroe	Butts Co.	
Reeves, Jonathan	Walton Ellisons	155	13	Monroe		
Reeves, Malachiah	Walton Ellisons	181	11	Monroe	Pike County	Upson Co.
Reeves, Thomas	Hall Robertsons	168	2	Monroe	Pike County	
Register, James	Laurens Mathers	218	13	Monroe		
Register, Jesse Jr.	Washington Wimberlys	151	1	Monroe	Pike County	
Register, Redden	Laurens McClendons	142	15	Monroe	Pike County	Upson Co.
Register, Sarah	Bullock Williams	99	9	Monroe	Pike County	
Reid, Elias	Chatham Mills	74	9	Monroe	Pike County	
Reid, John	Morgan Morrows	61	8	Monroe	Pike County	Lamar Co.
Reids, Andres (Orps)	Jackson Stricklands	165	10	Monroe	Pike County	Upson Co.
Remson, Hamilton	Lincoln Jones	105	12	Monroe		
Renfroe, Joel	Jones Burkhalters	152	8	Monroe	Pike County	
Reynolds, Benj. Sr.	Jones Haws	103	6	Monroe		
Reynolds, Charles	Franklin Turkes	197	8	Monroe	Pike County	
Rhodes, Benjamin (Orps)	Wilkes Bryants	213	1	Monroe	Pike County	
Rhodes, Isaac	Oglethorpe Bowles	6	8	Monroe	Pike County	Lamar Co.
Rhodes, Lemuel B	Greene Greers	121	12	Monroe		
Rhodes, Richard	Wilkes Bryants	162	13	Monroe		
Rhymes, William	Greene Greers	358	13	Monroe	Bibb Co.	
Rhymes, Willis	Warren Huberts	40	5	Monroe		
Riach, William	Laurens Mathers	232	9	Monroe	Pike County	
Rice, Edward	Franklin Flemings	240	12	Monroe		
Rice, John	Habersham McGrary	62	3	Monroe	Pike County	
Rich, Mary (Wid)	Elbert Olivers	214	5	Monroe		
Richards, Azariah	Greene Catos	218	10	Monroe	Pike County	Upson Co.
Richards, Francis	Chatham Mills	249	8	Monroe	Pike County	
Richards, Hannah B. Wid	Chatham Rowells	235	9	Monroe	Pike County	
Richards, Lydia	Greene Astins	105	8	Monroe	Pike County	
Richards, Thomas	Madison Bangles	249	7	Monroe	Lamar Co.	
Richardson, Amos	Elbert Dooleys	93	7	Monroe	Pike County	Lamar Co.
Richardson, David D.	Liberty Frasers	42	15	Monroe	Pike County	Upson Co.
Richardson, Martha Wid	Chatham Raifords	48	12	Monroe		
Richarson, John	McIntosh 271st	16	7	Monroe	Pike County	Lamar Co.
Richey, Ann (Wid)	McIntosh 22nd	338	13	Monroe	Bibb Co.	
Richey, Anthony (Orps)	Hall Brooks	194	4	Monroe	Butts Co.	
Ricker, William	Laurens Mathers	52	3	Monroe	Pike County	Spalding Co.
Ricker, Abraham	Chatham Mills	15	12	Monroe		
Ricketson, James	Warren Jernigans	95	9	Monroe	Pike County	
Ricketts, John (Orps)	Jones Rosson	160	15	Monroe	Pike County	Upson Co.
Riddle, Lewis	Jasper Phillips	161	4	Monroe	Butts Co.	
Riddle, William	Jasper Phillips	25	2	Monroe	Pike County	
Right, Levi	Tattnall Durrances	79	12	Monroe		
Riley, James	Hall Buffingtons	188	1	Monroe	Pike County	
Rimes, James	Bullock Denmarks	55	7	Monroe	Pike County	Lamar Co.
Rimes, John Jr.	Bullock Denmarks	86	8	Monroe	Pike County	Lamar Co.
Riviere, Richard (Orph)	Wilkes Willis	240	11	Monroe	Pike County	Upson Co.
Roach, Elisha	Hancock Daniels	210	4	Monroe	Butts Co.	
Roberds, Demcy	Morgan Tomlinsons	47	8	Monroe	Pike County	Lamar Co.
Roberson, David (Orps)	Jackson Scotts	120	4	Monroe	Butts Co.	
Roberson, Robert	Bryan Smiths	45	15	Monroe	Pike County	Upson Co.
Roberts, Benjamin	Hancock Brantleys	44	10	Monroe	Pike County	Upson Co.
Roberts, Daniel W.	Laurens Mathers	34	14	Monroe	Butts Co.	
Roberts, Elijah	Elbert Olivers	239	2	Monroe	Pike County	Spalding Co.
Roberts, Elijah	Scriven Mills	89	10	Monroe	Pike County	Upson Co.
Roberts, Jesse H	Lincoln Graves	193	15	Monroe	Pike County	Upson Co.
Roberts, John	Montgomery McElveens	85	2	Monroe	Pike County	Spalding Co.
Roberts, John	Appling Bryans	95	10	Monroe	Pike County	Upson Co.
Roberts, John S.	Scriven Mills	213	10	Monroe	Pike County	Upson Co.
Roberts, Mark	Laurens Carsons	187	15	Monroe	Pike County	Upson Co.
Roberts, Martha (Wid)	Scriven Bracks	184	13	Monroe		
Roberts, Mary (Orps)	Jasper 365th Dist	84	9	Monroe	Pike County	
Roberts, Mary (Wid)	Warren Wilders	239	15	Monroe	Pike County	Upson Co.
Roberts, Norrell (Orps)	Montgomery Colquhouns	233	9	Monroe	Pike County	
Roberts, Richard	Wilkinson Jordans	99	1	Monroe	Pike County	Spalding Co.
Roberts, Robert	Jackson Olivers	35	15	Monroe	Pike County	Upson Co.
Roberts, Simon	Columbia Wilsons	75	10	Monroe	Pike County	Upson Co.
Roberts, Tabitha (Wid)	Camden Halls	168	13	Monroe	Bibb Co.	
Roberts, Thomas S.	Warren Wilders	77	3	Monroe	Pike County	Spalding Co.
Roberts, William	Jones Permenters	244	6	Monroe		
Roberts, William	Scriven Bufords	138	12	Monroe		
Roberts, Zachariah	Columbia Wilsons	108	4	Monroe	Butts Co.	
Robertson, Nathaniel	Jones Hansfords	24	1	Monroe	Pike County	Spalding Co.
Robertson, Willis	McIntosh 271st	249	13	Monroe	Bibb Co.	
Robey, Sarah	Jasper Burneys	229	1	Monroe	Pike County	
Robinson, Adam	Jones Permenters	198	1	Monroe	Pike County	
Robinson, Cyrus	Morgan Tomlinsons	12	9	Monroe	Pike County	
Robinson, Jane (Wid)	Jasper Dardens	42	8	Monroe	Pike County	Lamar Co.
Robinson, Luke	Gwinnett Dobbs	103	5	Monroe		
Robinson, Nicabud	Appling Westers	106	4	Monroe	Butts Co.	
Robinson, William	Wilkes Thurmonds	154	13	Monroe		
Robinson, William	Chatham	308	13	Monroe	Bibb Co.	
Robison, John G.	Washington Robisons	107	1	Monroe	Pike County	Spalding Co.
Robison, Thomas	Washington Robisons	248	10	Monroe	Pike County	Upson Co.
Robns, Sarah	Greene Tallys	212	8	Monroe	Pike County	
Robson, James	Wayne Langsters	220	3	Monroe	Lamar Co.	
Rodden, Abner	Jasper 365th Dist	75	9	Monroe	Pike County	
Roden, John	Wayne Jacobs	180	13	Monroe		
Roebuck, John W.	Elbert Dobbs	119	1	Monroe	Pike County	
Rogers, Jacob	Jackson Knoxs	196	2	Monroe	Pike County	Lamar Co.
Rogers, John	Appling Newmans	246	3	Monroe		
Rogers, Richard	Burke Jourdans	252	12	Monroe		
Rogers, Richmond C.	Morgan Buckners	238	8	Monroe	Pike County	
Rogers, Stephen	Jefferson Smiths	111	6	Monroe		
Rogers, William	Putnam Walkers	150	5	Monroe		
Rogers, William Jr.	Tattnall Durrences	255	12	Monroe		
Rogers, Wm. B.	Baldwin Husons	202	2	Monroe	Pike County	
Rogerson, Ann (Orph)	Chatham Mills	155	15	Monroe	Pike County	Upson Co.
Roland Robert	Warren Williams	142	8	Monroe	Pike County	
Ross, Rowland	Jones Haws	127	11	Monroe	Lamar Co.	
Ross, Sarah (Wid)	Columbia Jones	73	8	Monroe	Pike County	Lamar Co.
Roundtree, Francis	Irwin Statehams	108	10	Monroe	Pike County	Upson Co.
Roundtree, William	Scriven Mills	4	5	Monroe		
Roundtree, William	Scriven Mills	104	8	Monroe	Pike County	
Rouse, Solomon (Orphs)	Twiggs Halls	233	13	Monroe	Bibb Co.	
Rowe, John J.	Morgan Buckners	205	9	Monroe	Pike County	
Rowland, John B. (Orps)	Oglethorpe Holtsclaws	70	2	Monroe	Pike County	
Rowland, Nedom	Emanuel Olivers	166	8	Monroe	Pike County	
Rowland, Sherod	Oglethorpe Holtsclaws	194	11	Monroe	Pike County	Upson Co.
Ruark, Lemuel	Columbia Wilsons	50	3	Monroe	Pike County	Spalding Co.
Rucker, Willis	Wilkes Joseys	256	3	Monroe	Lamar Co.	
Rucks, William Jr.	Gwinnett Davis	130	15	Monroe	Pike County	Upson Co.
Ruddell, George	Twiggs Griffins	37	4	Monroe		
Rudisille, John	Hancock Johnsons	90	9	Monroe	Pike County	
Rumney, Edward W. S.	Putnam Brooks	53	2	Monroe	Pike County	Spalding Co.
Rumney, Sophia (Wid)	Greene Talleys	70	1	Monroe	Pike County	Spalding Co.
Runnels, Gabriel	Hancock Feens	27	15	Monroe	Pike County	Upson Co.
Runnels, Hugh	Wilkes Callaways	39	7	Monroe	Pike County	Lamar Co.
Ruse, James	Richmond Luthers	5	5	Monroe		
Rush, Sarah (Wid)	Habersham Taylors	60	15	Monroe	Pike County	Upson Co.
Russel, James	Wilkinson Mimms	137	4	Monroe	Butts Co.	
Russel, Wm. F. (Dr.)	Habersham Ritches	87	14	Monroe	Butts Co.	
Russell, John A.	Chatham Thiefs	60	8	Monroe	Pike County	Lamar Co.
Russell, Th0mas R.	Lincoln Anthonys	65	6	Monroe		
Rutherford, Reddin	Twiggs Thames	86	7	Monroe	Pike County	Lamar Co.
Rutland, Wiley	Greene Jordans	151	13	Monroe		
Rutledge, Rebecca (Wid)	Morgan Morelands	173	3	Monroe		
Ryal, David	Laurens Stevens	209	2	Monroe	Pike County	Spalding Co.
Rye, Wm. D.	Hancock Masons	49	2	Monroe	Pike County	Spalding Co.
Ryle, William	Wilkinson Brooks	74	15	Monroe	Pike County	Upson Co.
Safford, Isham H	Washington Floyds	142	12	Monroe		
Sager, John D. (Orps)	Greene Scotts	184	15	Monroe	Pike County	Upson Co.
Sagus, John	Wilkes Johnsons	194	13	Monroe		
Sales, Cordy	Twiggs Tysons	114	9	Monroe	Pike County	
Salfner, Mathew	Chatham Rowells	239	11	Monroe	Pike County	Upson Co.
Salter, Robert	Wilkinson Kettles	56	5	Monroe		
Salter, Robert	Wilkinson Kettles	134	5	Monroe		
Sammons, Howell	Walton Williams	132	12	Monroe		
Sampler, Jeremiah	Columbia Wilsons	58	12	Monroe		
Samples, Mary (Orph)	Putnam Baughs	210	15	Monroe	Pike County	Upson Co.
Sams, Edward H	McIntosh 21st	10	9	Monroe	Pike County	
Sandeford, John (Orps)	Burke Burks	251	15	Monroe	Pike County	Upson Co.
Sanderlin, Jesse	Chatham Thiefs	217	10	Monroe	Pike County	Upson Co.
Sanderlin, John A.	Glynn Mannings	182	1	Monroe	Pike County	
Sanderlin, Rob't (Orps)	Chatham Thiefs	161	10	Monroe	Pike County	Upson Co.
Sanders, Alsa	Jones Pitts	222	4	Monroe	Butts Co.	
Sanders, Charles H	Oglethorpe Goldings	210	2	Monroe	Pike County	Spalding Co.
Sanders, Henry	Wilkinson Wiggins	171	9	Monroe	Pike County	
Sanders, Joseph	Chatham Thiefs	202	1	Monroe	Pike County	
Sanders, Mary	Chatham Thiefs	65	11	Monroe	Lamar Co.	
Sanders, Shepherd B	Putnam Walters	224	11	Monroe	Pike County	Upson Co.
Sanders, Stephen	Baldwin Husons	52	13	Monroe		
Sanders, William	Putnam Sanders	54	14	Monroe	Butts Co.	
Sanderson, Eli	Madison Baughs	59	15	Monroe	Pike County	Upson Co.
Sandford, Benjamin	Jefferson Dodds	176	10	Monroe	Pike County	Upson Co.
Sandford, Pristly (Orp)	Warren Hammocks	96	13	Monroe		
Sandiforde, James	Liberty Frasers	84	2	Monroe	Pike County	Spalding Co.
Sandwich, Margaret (Wid)	Richmond Burtons	216	12	Monroe		
Sanford, Daniel	Greene	24	15	Monroe	Pike County	Upson Co.
Sanford, Jeremiah	Hancock Mattocks	152	3	Monroe	Lamar Co.	
Sapp, Moses	Wilkinson Brooks	236	11	Monroe	Pike County	Upson Co.
Sartain, John	Madison Powells	13	7	Monroe	Pike County	Lamar Co.
Sasser, William	Jones Rossons	172	15	Monroe	Pike County	Upson Co.
Satterwhite, Dawson	Columbia Gartrells	251	3	Monroe	Lamar Co.	
Satterwhite, Obed	Jones Pitts	125	5	Monroe		
Saunders, Fredrick (Orps)	Effington 9th	66	13	Monroe		
Saunders, Logan	Washington Williams	135	13	Monroe		
Saunders, Mary (Wid)	Hancock Swints	192	3	Monroe		
Savage, Mariah E. (Orph)	Richmond Lamars	157	6	Monroe		
Savell, John B.	Baldwin Haws	228	10	Monroe	Pike County	Upson Co.
Savin, Resolved	Jasper Burneys	122	4	Monroe	Butts Co.	
Sawyer, Cader	Twiggs McCrarys	85	1	Monroe	Pike County	Spalding Co.
Saxon, Samuel	Burke Jordens	13	5	Monroe		
Saylors, John	Jackson Haggards	35	6	Monroe		
Scarborough, Eliz. Wid)	Emanuel Lanes	136	12	Monroe		
Scarborough, Silas	Burke Lodges	14	1	Monroe	Pike County	Spalding Co.
Scarborough, Silas	Burke Lodges	110	15	Monroe	Pike County	Upson Co.
Scarborough, Wm.	Madison Powells	214	2	Monroe	Pike County	Spalding Co.
Schley, George	Chatham Mills	84	13	Monroe		
Schoedde, Theodore A	Chatham Thiefs	75	14	Monroe		
Scooder, John H	Chatham DeLyons	29	12	Monroe		
Scott, David	Laurens Stevens	148	8	Monroe	Pike County	
Scott, Drury	Scriven Mills	192	11	Monroe	Pike County	Upson Co.
Scott, Frances (Wid)	Greene Woodhams	1	7	Monroe	Pike County	Lamar Co.
Scott, Mary (Wid)	Glynn Mannings	158	3	Monroe	Lamar Co.	
Scott, Nathaniel	Scriven Mills	218	6	Monroe		
Scott, thomas	Franklin Tates	28	3	Monroe	Pike County	
Scott, William F.	Hancock Johnsons	127	9	Monroe	Pike County	
Screws, Benj	Jefferson Dodds	243	8	Monroe	Pike County	
Scroggins, King H	Putnam Johnsons	52	12	Monroe		
Scruggs, Abishai	Burke Burks	138	5	Monroe		
Scudder, Isaac	Chatham Thiefs	98	14	Monroe	Butts Co.	
Scurggs, Gross (Orps)	Burke Burks	116	10	Monroe	Pike County	Upson Co.
Seaborn, Bailey	Jones Haws	119	4	Monroe	Butts Co.	
Seale, Eli	Jones Pitts	160	9	Monroe	Pike County	
Sealey, William	Telfair Loves	151	6	Monroe		
Seals, Anthony	Twiggs Blackshears	55	6	Monroe		
Searcy, Benjamin R.	Baldwin Haws	64	2	Monroe	Pike County	
Searles, Robert	Lincoln Parkes	22	12	Monroe		
Seat, thomas	Morgan Nelsons	97	12	Monroe		
Seat, Thomas	Morgan Nelsons	179	15	Monroe	Pike County	Upson Co.
Segars, John	Jackson Flanagans	180	7	Monroe	Lamar Co.	
Selfs, Elijah (Orph)	Twiggs Thames	278	13	Monroe	Bibb Co.	
Selph, Amy Wid	Bullock Williams	66	8	Monroe	Pike County	Lamar Co.
Selph, Thomas	Telfair Robertsons	186	11	Monroe	Pike County	
Senterfit, John R.	Pulaski Roachs	57	15	Monroe	Pike County	Upson Co.
Senterfit, Milbry (Wid)	Pulaski Roachs	85	8	Monroe	Pike County	Lamar Co.
Sessions, James	Jasper Phillips	101	7	Monroe	Pike County	Lamar Co.
Shackleford, John (Orps)	Jackson Hansons	6	10	Monroe	Pike County	Upson Co.
Shad, John R.	Chatham Tebeans	332	13	Monroe	Bibb Co.	
Shaffer, Margaret (Wid)	Chatham Mills	94	4	Monroe	Butts Co.	
Shannon, David	Franklin S. Harris	50	9	Monroe	Pike County	
Sharley, Elizabeth (Wid)	Jones Permenters	87	15	Monroe	Pike County	Upson Co.
Sharley, Richard	Jones Phillips	295	13	Monroe	Bibb Co.	
Sharp, Marshall	Greene Jordans	180	4	Monroe	Butts Co.	
Sharpless, Joseph	Chatham Thiefs	7	10	Monroe	Pike County	Upson Co.
Shaw, Jeremiah	Liberty McCranies	30	5	Monroe		
Shaw, John A.	Morgan Shawsw	260	15	Monroe	Pike County	Upson Co.
Shaw, Wm. Sr.	Clark Harpers	41	7	Monroe	Pike County	Lamar Co.
Shearman, Eliza (Orph)	Chatham Mills	47	11	Monroe		
Shearman, Martha (Orph)	Chatham Mills	47	11	Monroe		
Shearouse, Emanuel	Effingham 11th	85	11	Monroe		
Sheffield, Jacob	Morgan Youngs	162	3	Monroe	Lamar Co.	
Shehee, Thomas	Washington Curry	167	8	Monroe	Pike County	
Shelby, Moses	Washington Quinn	71	11	Monroe	Lamar Co.	
Shelhons, Isaac (Orph)	Jones Permenters	148	4	Monroe	Butts Co.	
Shell, Abigail (Wid)	Morgan Shepards	123	13	Monroe		
Shelnut, James	Franklin Cokers	8	11	Monroe		
Shelton, Noel	Franklin Burton	232	3	Monroe	Lamar Co.	
Shepard, John	Chatham Thiefs	241	8	Monroe	Pike County	
Shepard, John	Chatham Thiefs	38	9	Monroe	Pike County	
Shepard, Joseph	Emanuel Lanes	127	1	Monroe	Pike County	Spalding Co.
Shepherd, Benj.	Putnam Buckners	31	9	Monroe	Pike County	
Shepherd, James	Burke Wards	225	12	Monroe		
Shepherd, John	Wilkinson Williams	13	10	Monroe	Pike County	Upson Co.
Shepherd, Joseph (Orph)	Pulaski Lesters	77	10	Monroe	Pike County	Upson Co.
Shepherd, Lucky B. (Orph)	Putnam Hendricks	27	6	Monroe		
Sheppard, Nathanl.	Wilkinson Mims	162	6	Monroe		
Sherod, Elizabeth (Wid)	Twiggs Bozemans	215	7	Monroe	Lamar Co.	
Sherrill, David	Greene Tuckers	33	15	Monroe	Pike County	Upson Co.
Shipp, James	Columbia Griffins	87	10	Monroe	Pike County	Upson Co.
Shipp, Lemuel	Columbia Griffins	85	5	Monroe		
Shirrer, Thomas	Wilkinson Mims	24	8	Monroe	Pike County	Lamar Co.
Shivers, Obadiah J.	Hancock Masons	257	9	Monroe	Pike County	
Shockley, John	Greene Astins	62	11	Monroe	Lamar Co.	
Shockley, Jonathan	Greene Jordans	256	13	Monroe		
Shoemate, Mason	Franklin Harris	127	2	Monroe	Pike County	
Shores, Elijah V.	Putnam Bledsoes	233	6	Monroe		
Short, John	Wilkes Hudspreths	87	3	Monroe	Pike County	Spalding Co.
Shropshire, James W.	Jasper Shropshires	78	5	Monroe		
Shynder, Henry	Chatham Mills	29	5	Monroe		
Shynder, Henry	Chatham Mills	252	10	Monroe	Pike County	Upson Co.
Sibley, Ira A.	Camden "Clarks	11	11	Monroe		
Signer, Hope H.	Clark Fosters	115	13	Monroe		
Sikes, James W.	Gwinnett Bridges	242	6	Monroe		
Sikes, Joseph (Orph)	Tantnall 401st	11	13	Monroe		
Silver, Silvester	Camden Clarks	195	15	Monroe	Pike County	Upson Co.
Silvester, Asbury	Bryan Smiths	22	3	Monroe	Pike County	Spalding Co.
Simminion, James	McIntosh 271st	62	7	Monroe	Pike County	Lamar Co.
Simmons, Charity (Wid)	Jones Phillips	20	3	Monroe	Pike County	Spalding Co.
Simmons, Charles	Madison Stricklands	141	6	Monroe		
Simmons, Ladoe	Wilkinsons Mims	48	9	Monroe	Pike County	
Simmons, Wm.	Putnam Sanders	80	7	Monroe	Pike County	Lamar Co.
Simmons, Wm. (Orph)	Warren Williams	199	11	Monroe	Pike County	Upson Co.
Simms, Reuben B.	Morgan Shaws	131	15	Monroe	Pike County	Upson Co.
Simpson, John	Chatham Thiefs	108	2	Monroe	Pike County	Spalding Co.
Sims, Benj. D.	Wilkes Hillhouses	32	2	Monroe	Pike County	
Sims, Benjamin A.	Baldwin Husons	241	2	Monroe	Pike County	Spalding Co.
Sims, Burkley	Madison Leepers	105	9	Monroe	Pike County	
Sims, James	Clarke Fosters	59	12	Monroe		
Sims, Martin	Oglethorpe 235th	103	2	Monroe	Pike County	
Sims, Sarah (Wid)	Chatham Thiefs	160	3	Monroe	Lamar Co.	
Singer, John	Hancock Mattocks	91	8	Monroe	Pike County	
Sissions, Robert W.	Wilkes Willis	15	5	Monroe		
Sisson, Mary (Wid)	Chatham Thiefs	242	1	Monroe	Pike County	
Skaggs, Rich. S.	Putnam Sanders	24	10	Monroe	Pike County	Upson Co.
Skeen, Sarah (Wid)	Hall McCutchens	32	4	Monroe		
Skinner, Charles (Wid)	Hancock Simms	259	11	Monroe	Pike County	Upson Co.
Skinner, Clary	Elbert Hannas	183	5	Monroe		
Skinner, Jacob	Baldwin Husons	231	9	Monroe	Pike County	
Skinner, John	Burke Cavenaughs	207	1	Monroe	Pike County	
Slade, Samuel	Jones Gresham	115	2	Monroe	Pike County	Spalding Co.
Slater, Samuel	Bullock Hagins	300	13	Monroe	Bibb Co.	
Slaton, Arthur	Columbia Wrights	178	8	Monroe	Pike County	
Slaughter, George	Greene Cato	169	2	Monroe	Pike County	Spalding Co.
Slaughter, John	Baldwin "McGees	100	5	Monroe		
Slaughter, John B.	Jasper Whites	86	2	Monroe	Pike County	Spalding Co.
Slaughter, John B.	Greene Woodhams	35	5	Monroe		
Slaughter, Martin	Greene Gregorys	11	5	Monroe		
Slaughter, Moses	Montgomery McElvens	88	14	Monroe	Butts Co.	
Slaughter, Reuben Jr.	Jones Millens	237	12	Monroe		
Sledge, Alexander	Baldwin Stephens	23	13	Monroe		
Sledge, Whitfield	Hancock Huff	162	1	Monroe	Pike County	
Sledge, William	Jones Phillips	253	8	Monroe	Pike County	
Sloan, John H.	Oglethorpe Jewell	12514	1	Monroe	Pike County	Spalding Co.
Slocumb, David	Jones Flowers	25	8	Monroe	Pike County	Lamar Co.
Smallwood, Eliz. (Wid)	Habersham Towsend	176	9	Monroe	Pike County	
Smally, William	Columbia Gartrells	208	2	Monroe	Pike County	Spalding Co.
Smar, William	Jefferson Watkins	209	6	Monroe		
Smerdea, James	Chatham Mills	215	8	Monroe	Pike County	
Smith, Benjamin	Hancock Kendalls	191	3	Monroe		
Smith, Brittain	Watson Gliders	3	13	Monroe		
Smith, Caleb	Wilkinson Brooks	234	6	Monroe		
Smith, Charles	Walton Wests	34	10	Monroe	Pike County	Upson Co.
Smith, Cotton J.	Habersham Taylors	203	10	Monroe	Pike County	Upson Co.
Smith, David (Orps)	Lauren Carsons	209	15	Monroe	Pike County	Upson Co.
Smith, Dolley	Washington Floyd	201	2	Monroe	Pike County	
Smith, Ebenezer	Putnam Moreland	3	10	Monroe	Pike County	Upson Co.
Smith, Edwin S.	Clarke Dickens	152	4	Monroe	Butts Co.	
Smith, English	Washington Robisons	265	13	Monroe	Bibb Co.	
Smith, Fanny (Wid)	Liberty McCranies	192	13	Monroe		
Smith, George	Warren Travis	232	1	Monroe	Pike County	
Smith, George	Washington Jenkins	312	13	Monroe	Bibb Co.	
Smith, Giddeon	Franklins Eddins	205	2	Monroe	Pike County	Spalding Co.
Smith, Guy	Morgan Harris	2	12	Monroe		
Smith, Hiram	Warren Williams	3	8	Monroe	Pike County	Lamar Co.
Smith, Isaac	Clarke Deans	8	12	Monroe		
Smith, James	Twiggs McCrarys	71	6	Monroe		
Smith, James	Twiggs McCrarys	111	7	Monroe	Pike County	Lamar Co.
Smith, Jessee	Washington Williams	88	12	Monroe		
Smith, John	Appling Boyds	77	5	Monroe		
Smith, John	Washington Echles	226	9	Monroe	Pike County	
Smith, John	Wilkinson Williams	118	10	Monroe	Pike County	Upson Co.
Smith, John	Appling Boyds	219	12	Monroe		
Smith, John (Sadler)	Clarke Deans	19	1	Monroe	Pike County	Spalding Co.
Smith, John A.	Putnam Morelands	25	6	Monroe		
Smith, John D.	Twiggs Blackshear	2	7	Monroe	Pike County	Lamar Co.
Smith, John R.	Baldwin Whites	160	4	Monroe	Butts Co.	
Smith, John T.	Chatham	82	4	Monroe		
Smith, John T.	Chatham	27	14	Monroe		
Smith, Joshua	Telfair Edwards	17	2	Monroe	Pike County	Spalding Co.
Smith, Joshua A.	Habersham McCrary	155	5	Monroe		
Smith, Sion	Oglethorpe 226th	166	15	Monroe	Pike County	Upson Co.
Smith, Stephen	Habersham Words	172	7	Monroe	Lamar Co.	
Smith, Thomas P.	Laurens Coats	239	7	Monroe	Lamar Co.	
Smith, William	Twiggs McCrary	161	5	Monroe		
Smith, William	Jones Flowers	182	13	Monroe		
Smith, Wm.	Morgan Shaws	206	1	Monroe	Pike County	
Smith, Wm.	Chatham Thiefs	34	2	Monroe	Pike County	
Sneed, Beacham	Walton Kolbs	154	4	Monroe	Butts Co.	
Snelling, Phoebe L. (Orph)	Pulaski Dewitt	177	15	Monroe	Pike County	Upson Co.
Snider, Elizabeth (Wid)	Warren Travis	134	15	Monroe	Pike County	Upson Co.
Sockwell, William	Franklin Yanceys	14	3	Monroe	Pike County	Spalding Co.
Solley, John	Franklin cokers	217	2	Monroe	Pike County	Lamar Co.
Sorrell, Green	Gwinnett Dobbs	244	12	Monroe		
Soullard, Edward H.	Hancock Johnson	123	9	Monroe	Pike County	
Sparrow, Abraham	Jackson Haggards	69	2	Monroe	Pike County	
Speed, Martin	Twiggs Griffin	243	10	Monroe	Pike County	Upson Co.
Spence, Blueford	Emanuel Price	106	13	Monroe	Bibb Co.	
Spier, James	McIntosh 22nd	123	4	Monroe	Butts Co.	
Spier, Solomon	Wilkinsons Kettles	111	5	Monroe		
Spiers, John	Jasper Phillips	142	2	Monroe	Pike County	Spalding Co.
Spikes, Isaac	Lincoln Walkers	51	11	Monroe		
Spires, George (Orps)	Jefferson Fountains	180	15	Monroe	Pike County	Upson Co.
Spratlen, John	Wilkes Hudspeths	69	6	Monroe		
Spratlen, John	Wilkes Hudspeths	33	11	Monroe	Lamar Co.	
Spratlen, Winnefred (Wid)	Wilkes Hudspeths	226	2	Monroe	Pike County	Lamar Co.
Stafford, Argent (Wid)	Appling Brynas	88	1	Monroe	Pike County	Spalding Co.
Stafford, Ezekiel	Tantall Padgets	73	12	Monroe		
Stafford, Wm. Sr.	Wayne Oneils	16	5	Monroe		
Stamper, Polly (Wid)	Wilkes Coopers	36	11	Monroe	Lamar Co.	
Stamps, Moses, Jr.	Clarke Hightower	150	7	Monroe	Lamar Co.	
Standard, John Sr.	Lincoln Blalock	164	5	Monroe		
Stanford, Elijah (Orps)	Bullock Williams	83	1	Monroe	Pike County	Spalding Co.
Stanley, Ezekiel	Greene Allen	97	7	Monroe	Pike County	Lamar Co.
Stanley, James	Gwinnett Bridges	93	11	Monroe		
Stansell, John J.	Habersham Townsend	238	2	Monroe	Pike County	Spalding Co.
Staples, Thomas (Orph)	Wilkes Harris	65	5	Monroe		
Starks, Phillip I. (Orph)	Wilkes Freemans	35	12	Monroe		
Starling, Wiley I.	None Dardens	218	2	Monroe	Pike County	Lamar Co.
Starnes, Ebenezer	Richmond Lamars	123	10	Monroe	Pike County	Upson Co.
Starr, John	Chatham Mills	96	11	Monroe	Lamar Co.	
Statesbury, John	Camden Clarks	58	11	Monroe		
Stembridge, Wm.	Putnam Jurnigans	88	13	Monroe		
Stephens, David	Clark Harpers	158	11	Monroe	Pike County	Upson Co.
Stephens, Frances (Wid)	Oglethorpe 226th	18	15	Monroe	Pike County	Upson Co.
Stephens, Isham	Twiggs Houses	181	7	Monroe	Lamar Co.	
Stephens, John	Jasper Barnes	214	15	Monroe	Pike County	Upson Co.
Stephens, Joseph Sr.	Wilkinson Brooks	169	6	Monroe		
Stephens, S. Eviline (Orph)	Chatham Mills	109	15	Monroe	Pike County	Upson Co.
Stephens, Thomas	Hall Carnes	174	3	Monroe		
Stephenson, John	Wilkinson Brooks	96	12	Monroe		
Stephenson, Moore	Putnam Jurnigans	68	6	Monroe		
Stevens, Burrel	Jefferson Whighams	2	13	Monroe		
Stevens, Cass (Orph)	Jones Flowers	171	12	Monroe		
Stevens, Corbet	Putnam Buckners	195	6	Monroe		
Stewart, Andrew	Warren Huberts	257	13	Monroe		
Stewart, Edmund	Warren Harris	235	4	Monroe	Butts Co.	
Stewart, James	Pulaski Regans	105	3	Monroe	Pike County	Spalding Co.
Stewart, James	Lincoln Graves	225	4	Monroe	Butts Co.	
Stewart, James	Putnam Leggets	196	11	Monroe	Pike County	Upson Co.
Stewart, James	Clarke Dickens	250	11	Monroe	Pike County	Upson Co.
Stewart, James B.	Wayne Jacobs	44	15	Monroe	Pike County	Upson Co.
Stewart, James W.	Camden Browns	125	7	Monroe	Pike County	
Stewart, James W.	Clarke Dickens	9	13	Monroe		
Stewart, John	Wayne Sangsters	126	15	Monroe	Pike County	Upson Co.
Stewart, Joseph	Morgan Harris	133	2	Monroe	Pike County	Lamar Co.
Stewart, Thomas	Morgan Harris	248	6	Monroe		
Still, John	Hall Millers	101	11	Monroe	Lamar Co.	
Stillwell, Shadrac	Jones Mullins	125	10	Monroe	Pike County	Upson Co.
Stoe, James	Franklin Williams	128	6	Monroe		
Stokes, Allen	Wilkinson Jordans	219	2	Monroe	Pike County	Lamar Co.
Stokes, Augustus H.	Morgan Nelsons	64	15	Monroe	Pike County	Upson Co.
Stokes, Henry	Twiggs Bozemans	266	13	Monroe	Bibb Co.	
Stokes, Josiah	Lauren Swearingtons	251	6	Monroe		
Stone, Hardy	Warren Travis	179	11	Monroe	Pike County	Upson Co.
Stone, Hardy	Warren Travis	28	13	Monroe		
Stone, Joel	Clarke Browns	167	9	Monroe	Pike County	
Stone, Samuel	Telfair Wilcox	148	11	Monroe	Pike County	Upson Co.
Stones, Wm.	Jones Burkhalters	161	9	Monroe	Pike County	
Stonham, James	Jackson Mays	19	11	Monroe		
Story, Basdel	Warren Williams	257	12	Monroe		
Stout, John G.	Appling Newmans	100	2	Monroe	Pike County	
Stoveall, John Sr.	Franklin Seals	53	6	Monroe		
Strange, Godwon	Washington Williams	6	7	Monroe	Pike County	Lamar Co.
Strawhaiker, Elizabeth (Wid)	Chatham Mills	68	3	Monroe	Pike County	
Streetman, Amos L.	Twiggs Thames	96	8	Monroe	Pike County	
Strickland, Barnabas	Jasper Martins	35	1	Monroe	Pike County	Spalding Co.
Strickland, Humphrey	Liberty McCranies	14	12	Monroe		
Stringfellow, Samuel	Richmond Lamars	224	15	Monroe	Pike County	Upson Co.
Stripling, Polly (Wid)	Jones Flowers	232	7	Monroe	Lamar Co.	
Stripling, William Jr.	Jones Permenters	84	10	Monroe	Pike County	Upson Co.
Strong, Elijah	Clarke Dean	127	7	Monroe	Pike County	
Stroud, James	Walton Kolbs	155	8	Monroe	Pike County	
Stroud, Mary (Wid)	Jones Phillips	173	10	Monroe	Pike County	Upson Co.
Strowther, Susannah (Wid)	Liberty Frasers	120	6	Monroe		
Stuart, James	Putnam Leggets	36	13	Monroe		
Stubbs, Benjamin	Wilkinson Wiggins	230	7	Monroe	Lamar Co.	
Sturges, Daniel	Baldwin Malcoms	111	9	Monroe	Pike County	
Sturges, Oliver	Chatham Mills	146	15	Monroe	Pike County	Upson Co.
Sulivan, Wm. Jr.	Montgomery -	128	9	Monroe	Pike County	
Sulivant, Spencer	Putnam Walkers	24	11	Monroe		
Summerlin, John	Glynn Burnetts	28	1	Monroe	Pike County	Spalding Co.
Summons, Isaac	Jasper Barnes	64	11	Monroe	Lamar Co.	
Sumner, Joseph Jr.	Emanuel Chasons	128	11	Monroe	Lamar Co.	
Sumner, Reuben	Richmond Lamars	36	7	Monroe	Pike County	Lamar Co.
Sutton, Catharine(Wid)	Habersham Suttons	223	8	Monroe	Pike County	
Sutton, Jacob	Jefferson Dods	26	8	Monroe	Pike County	Lamar Co.
Sutton, James A.	Twiggs Bozemans	260	13	Monroe		
Swan, George	Greene Woodhams	41	13	Monroe		
Swan, Isaac	Jasper Whites	76	4	Monroe		
Sweat, Abner W.	Tatnall 401st	90	5	Monroe		
Sweeny, Daniel	Chatham Thiefs	188	7	Monroe	Lamar Co.	
Swilly, Samuel E.	Appling Boyds	145	11	Monroe	Pike County	Upson Co.
Swindle, Solomon	Morgan Campbells	115	11	Monroe	Lamar Co.	
Swint, William	Hancock Swints	68	8	Monroe	Pike County	Lamar Co.
Switzer, Bird	Putnam Bledoses	151	7	Monroe	Lamar Co.	
Switzer, Bird	Putnam Bledoses	221	12	Monroe		
Switzer, William	Putnam Bledoses	246	15	Monroe	Pike County	Upson Co.
Sykes, Elizabeth (Wid)	Columbia Shaws	82	5	Monroe		
Taber, Isaac	Franklin Tates	328	13	Monroe	Bibb Co.	
Tankersley, Littleton	Jackson Stricklands	73	14	Monroe	Butts Co.	
Tanner, Gideon	Walton Williams	58	14	Monroe	Butts Co.	
Tanner, Jesse	Greene Talleys	123	7	Monroe	Pike County	Lamar Co.
Tanner, Vinson	Washington Wimberleys	60	9	Monroe	Pike County	
Tapley, Joel	Baldwin McCrarys	42	10	Monroe	Pike County	Upson Co.
Tapley, Patsey (Wid)	Wilkinson Brooks	110	11	Monroe	Lamar Co.	
Tarbee, Mary (Wid)	Warren Hutchinsons	62	8	Monroe	Pike County	Lamar Co.
Tarver, Henry	Twiggs McCrarys	26	11	Monroe		
Tarver, John R.	Richmond Palmers	192	12	Monroe		
Tarver, Robt. W.	Wilkes Moores	94	8	Monroe	Pike County	
Tarver, Solomon	Washington Winberlys	246	8	Monroe	Pike County	
Tate, Rowland	Pulaski Lesters	78	15	Monroe	Pike County	Upson Co.
Tatnall, Edward F.	Chatham Mills	120	3	Monroe	Pike County	Spalding Co.
Taylor, Edin	Baldwin Stephens	172	11	Monroe	Pike County	Upson Co.
Taylor, George	Jefferson Halls	219	11	Monroe	Pike County	
Taylor, James	Scriven Bufords	48	14	Monroe		
Taylor, James H.	Green Winfields	248	15	Monroe	Pike County	Upson Co.
Taylor, Job	Jones Coxs	176	15	Monroe	Pike County	Upson Co.
Taylor, John M.	Putnam Bledsoes	183	9	Monroe	Pike County	
Taylor, Jonathan	Irwin Gilders	44	7	Monroe	Pike County	Lamar Co.
Taylor, Moses (Orph)	Jones Cabaniss	197	10	Monroe	Pike County	Upson Co.
Taylor, William	Burke Taylors	161	12	Monroe		
Taylor, Winney (Wid)	Elbert Olivers	5	13	Monroe		
Tedders, Samuel	Jasper Martins	77	6	Monroe		
Temples, Jones (Orps)	Tatnall Durrances	95	12	Monroe		
Templeton, Wm.	Richmond Palmers	83	9	Monroe	Pike County	
Tennell, Robert	Washington Mills	230	2	Monroe	Pike County	Lamar Co.
Terrell, Thomas	Wilkes Hilhouses	122	12	Monroe		
Terrell, Wm. A.	Wilkes Hillhouses	137	15	Monroe	Pike County	Upson Co.
Terrill, Richmond (Orps)	Putnam Paces	111	14	Monroe		
Terry, John Jr.	Lincoln Leverets	36	14	Monroe	Butts Co.	
Terry, John Sr.	Lincoln Leverets	208	10	Monroe	Pike County	Upson Co.
Terry, John Sr.	Lincoln Leverets	248	11	Monroe	Pike County	Upson Co.
Tetchstone, Christopher	Effingham 11th	226	7	Monroe	Lamar Co.	
Tever, Jacob	Madison Vineyards	72	2	Monroe	Pike County	
Tever, Wm.	Madison Griffins	92	4	Monroe	Butts Co.	
Tharp, John A. Jr.	Twiggs Houses	215	1	Monroe	Pike County	
Tharpe, Elias A.	Twiggs Bozemans	252	13	Monroe		
Theatt, Drury	Jasper Johns	209	7	Monroe	Lamar Co.	
Thigpen, Claborn	Warren Travis	52	14	Monroe	Butts Co.	
Thigpen, Randol	Warren Travis	220	2	Monroe	Pike County	Lamar Co.
Thomas, Camp	Gwinnett Bridges	62	1	Monroe	Pike County	Spalding Co.
Thomas, Charles	Chatham	182	9	Monroe	Pike County	
Thomas, Charles	Chatham	242	12	Monroe		
Thomas, David	McIntosh 271st	249	6	Monroe		
Thomas, David (Orph)	Baldwin Whites	89	2	Monroe	Pike County	
Thomas, Edward L.	Clarke Fosters	65	9	Monroe	Pike County	
Thomas, James	Wilkinson Pierces	142	9	Monroe	Pike County	
Thomas, John	Morgan Nelsons	94	15	Monroe	Pike County	Upson Co.
Thomas, Nicholas (Orph)	Effingham 10th	113	5	Monroe		
Thomas, Wm. L. (Orph)	Richmond Luthers	2	6	Monroe		
Thomason, John	Hancock Brantleys	146	3	Monroe		
Thomasson, Rolin	Hancock Johnsons	80	5	Monroe		
Thomble, Thomas	Washington Morrisons	245	2	Monroe	Pike County	Spalding Co.
Thompson, Asa	Emanuel Jordens	112	6	Monroe		
Thompson, Benj. R.	Laurens Milton	153	6	Monroe		
Thompson, Bridges	Laurens Matherss	204	6	Monroe		
Thompson, David H.	Chatham DeLyons	99	4	Monroe	Butts Co.	
Thompson, Gaines	Elbert Penns	104	12	Monroe		
Thompson, Henry B.	Gwinnett Davis	262	10	Monroe	Pike County	Upson Co.
Thompson, James	Richmond, Luthers	117	1	Monroe	Pike County	Spalding Co.
Thompson, James	Jones Pitts	15	4	Monroe		
Thompson, James	Jasper Wallaces	68	5	Monroe		
Thompson, John	Emanuel Chasons	163	2	Monroe	Pike County	
Thompson, Mary (Wid)	Warren, Williams	141	3	Monroe		
Thompson, Nancy (Wid)	Warren Williams	149	5	Monroe		
Thompson, Nancy (Wid)	Morgan Harris	46	8	Monroe	Pike County	Lamar Co.
Thompson, Peter	Pulaski Yarbroughs	34	15	Monroe	Pike County	Upson Co.
Thompson, Sarah (Wid)	Jasper 293rd	97	14	Monroe	Butts Co.	
Thompson, Solomon	Burke Cavanaghs	162	5	Monroe		
Thompson, Thos.	Clarke Fosters	243	11	Monroe	Pike County	Upson Co.
Thompson, William	Twiggs Hall	140	13	Monroe		
Thornton, Abel	Hancock Mattocks	124	5	Monroe		
Thornton, Culin	Jasper Phillips	31	6	Monroe		
Thornton, Lucy (Wid)	Elbert Burdens	213	2	Monroe	Pike County	Spalding Co.
Thornton, Thos. A.	Jackson Haggard	21	6	Monroe		
Thornton, Wiley	Jasper Pollards	174	13	Monroe	Bibb Co.	
Thornton, Yancy	Jasper 293rd	218	3	Monroe	Lamar Co.	
Thorpe, Elizabeth (Orph)	McIntosh 22nd	220	13	Monroe		
Thos. Garner	Habersham Flanagan	259	15	Monroe	Pike County	Upson Co.
Thrash, David	Putnam Bledsoes	34	7	Monroe	Pike County	Lamar Co.
Thrower, Eliz. (Wid)	McIntosh 271st	118	5	Monroe		
Tibean, Catharine(Wid)	Chatham Tibean	147	1	Monroe	Pike County	
Ticer, Hugh	Warren Williams	196	12	Monroe		
Tidd, James	Jones Buckhalters	27	13	Monroe		
Tidwell, Henry	Hall Brooks	15	3	Monroe	Pike County	Spalding Co.
Tilly, James H.	Wilkinson Pierces	14	7	Monroe	Pike County	Lamar Co.
Tilly, George	Burke Burkes	28	6	Monroe		
Tilmon, Aaron	Jackson Oliver	40	15	Monroe	Pike County	Upson Co.
Tindal, James	Montgomery Adams	253	11	Monroe	Pike County	Upson Co.
Tingle, John	Jefferson Waldons	225	6	Monroe		
Tinley, Vinsen	Richmond Winterss	29	8	Monroe	Pike County	Lamar Co.
Tinnon, David	Walton Wagnons	145	10	Monroe	Pike County	Upson Co.
Tinny, Oliver	Chatham Raifords	186	2	Monroe	Pike County	Lamar Co.
Tinsley, Thomas	Baldwin Malcolms	53	3	Monroe	Pike County	Spalding Co.
Todd, John	Morgan Sheppards	5	15	Monroe	Pike County	Upson Co.
Todd, Joseph W.	Jackson Scotts	270	11	Monroe	Pike County	Upson Co.
Todd, Joseph W	Jackson Scotts	251	11	Monroe	Pike County	Upson Co.
Tomlin, Zachariah L. F.	Burke Powells	7	14	Monroe	Butts Co.	
Tomlinson, George	Wilkes Reeves	167	11	Monroe	Pike County	Upson Co.
Tomlinson, John	Twiggs Bozemans	133	9	Monroe	Pike County	
Tompkins, william (Orph)	Baldwin Whites	6	6	Monroe		
Toole, George W	Columbia Gartrells	42	5	Monroe		
Tootle, Feraby	Washington Eckles	198	4	Monroe	Butts Co.	
Torrence, Saml.	Warren Torrences	82	2	Monroe	Pike County	Spalding Co.
Torrence, John M.	Morgan Morrows	203	5	Monroe		
Totty, William	Greene Gregorys	83	5	Monroe		
Touges, John (Orph)	Chatham Thiess	46	15	Monroe	Pike County	Upson Co.
Towers, Isaac Sr.	Gwinnett Tippins	121	1	Monroe	Pike County	Spalding Co.
Towers, William Jr.	Gwinnett Tippins	134	6	Monroe		
Towns, John T. C.	Jasper Thomas	66	2	Monroe	Pike County	
Townsend, Edwards	Habersham Townsends	266	12	Monroe		
Townsend, Light	Liberty Mells	157	10	Monroe	Pike County	Upson Co.
Tracy, Carols	Brantleys	235	11	Monroe	Pike County	Upson Co.
Tramel, Asa	Putnam Mehones	151	10	Monroe	Pike County	Upson Co.
Trammell, John	Habersham Trammells	181	2	Monroe	Pike County	Spalding Co.
Trammell, Peter	Wilkes Reeves	110	3	Monroe	Pike County	Spalding Co.
Tredwell, Isaac, Jr.	Walton Wests	179	5	Monroe		
Tribble, Benj	Madison Leepers	1	15	Monroe	Pike County	Upson Co.
Trimble, Philip L	Walton Kolbs	200	12	Monroe		
Tripp, Turner H	Clarke Browns	141	1	Monroe	Pike County	
Troutland, Joseph	Effingham 12th	154	2	Monroe	Pike County	
Truluck, John	Jefferson Watkins	99	13	Monroe		
Tucker, Robert	Jasper Wallis	212	15	Monroe	Pike County	Upson Co.
Tucker, Robert (Orps)	Washington Williams	177	9	Monroe	Pike County	
Tucker, Sarah W. (Wid	Jones Huffs	108	7	Monroe	Pike County	Lamar Co.
Tullirs, Temple (Orph)	Effingham 13th	136	10	Monroe	Pike County	Upson Co.
Tumer, Jacob P.	Hancock Colemans	165	9	Monroe	Pike County	
Turk, Avington	Jasper Ryans	133	13	Monroe		
Turman, Abner T.	Elbert Tatoms	79	5	Monroe		
Turmon, James Sr.	Franklin Holsonback	123	8	Monroe	Pike County	
Turner, Boswell (Orps)	Putnam Bledsoes	154	8	Monroe	Pike County	
Turner, Elizabeth (Wid)	Wilkinson Kettles	183	13	Monroe		
Turner, James Jr.	Tattnall Durrences	210	5	Monroe		
Turner, Charles (Orph)	Burke Cavenahs	112	3	Monroe	Pike County	Spalding Co.
Turner, John C,.	Warren Blunts	220	9	Monroe	Pike County	
Turner, Stephen C.	Warren Blunts	250	9	Monroe	Pike County	
Turner, Alexander	Laurens Swearingens	117	7	Monroe	Pike County	Lamar Co.
Turner, John Sr.	Madison Powells	244	11	Monroe	Pike County	Upson Co.
Turpin, Sacker P.	Wilkes Hillhouses	189	5	Monroe		
Tutthell, Eliza A. (Wid)	Chatham Mills	71	4	Monroe		
Tyar, William	Appling Websters	37	7	Monroe	Pike County	Lamar Co.
Tyler, Frances	Lincoln Walkers	193	10	Monroe	Pike County	Upson Co.
Tyson, John	Washington Jenkins	199	8	Monroe	Pike County	
Underwood, John G.	Lincoln Anthonys	241	10	Monroe	Pike County	Upson Co.
Underwood, James	Laurens Smiths	26	5	Monroe		
Underwood, Sarah (Wid)	Wilkinson Brooks	175	12	Monroe		
Underwood, Wm. H	Elbert Wards	90	6	Monroe		
Upchurch, Charles	Putnam Paces	4	12	Monroe		
Upchurch, Keaton	Greene Woodhams	46	13	Monroe		
Upchurch, Eaton	Greene Woodhams	21	1	Monroe	Pike County	Spalding Co.
Upshaw, Forrester	Madison Griffiths	72	15	Monroe	Pike County	Upson Co.
Urguhart, Neill	Jasper 293rd	202	9	Monroe	Pike County	
Usery, John	Laurens Stevens	196	8	Monroe	Pike County	
Vanzant, Garred	Jones Phillips	67	2	Monroe	Pike County	
Varner, Marcus	Putnam Bledsoes	21	3	Monroe	Pike County	Spalding Co.
Varnum, John	Oglethorpe Holtzclaws	202	3	Monroe	Lamar Co.	
Vaughn, Alexander	Oglethorpe Huffs	40	11	Monroe	Lamar Co.	
Vaughn, Darkis	Habersham Hanagans	51	15	Monroe	Pike County	Upson Co.
Vaughn, Howell	Morgan Nelsons	100	6	Monroe		
Vaughn, James	Jasper Whites	173	11	Monroe	Pike County	Upson Co.
Vaughn, John	Walton Wagnons	134	7	Monroe	Lamar Co.	
Vaughn, Starling	Walton Wagnons	31	14	Monroe		
Veazy, James	Baldwin Haws	154	5	Monroe		
Vestal, Daniel	McIntosh 24th	57	13	Monroe		
Vick, Jonathan	Appling Newmans	66	6	Monroe		
Vickers, Joseph	Laurens Carsons	156	4	Monroe	Butts Co.	
Vickers, Stephen	Montgomery Adams	94	9	Monroe	Pike County	
Vickery, Aron Jr.	Elbert Dobbs	129	12	Monroe		
Vincent, Pleasant	Walton Gilders	210	11	Monroe	Pike County	
Vines, Hiram	Jones Permenters	17	6	Monroe		
Vineyard, James Sr.	Madison Vinyards	113	11	Monroe	Lamar Co.	
Vining, John	Walton, Williams	18	1	Monroe	Pike County	Spalding Co.
Vionson, Nathan	Washington O'Quins	121	7	Monroe	Pike County	Lamar Co.
Virden, William	Warren Hutchinson	17	8	Monroe	Pike County	Lamar Co.
Wade, James	Jasper Burney	14	5	Monroe		
Wade, James	Franklin Bartons	92	6	Monroe		
Wades, Hampton (Orps)	Oglethorpe 236th	37	12	Monroe		
Wadkins, Sarah (Wid)	Wilkinson Brooks	170	8	Monroe	Pike County	
Wadsworth, Danl.	Camden Browns	150	4	Monroe	Butts Co.	
Wadsworth, Nancy (Wid)	Lincoln Parkers	57	8	Monroe	Pike County	Lamar Co.
Waid, John	Gwinnett Ellisons	174	1	Monroe	Pike County	
Waid, Samuel	Twiggs Bosemans	38	5	Monroe		
Waits, Benj.	Jasper Shropshire	104	9	Monroe	Pike County	
Wakerfield, Wm.	Morgan Wagnons	93	9	Monroe	Pike County	
Walden, Lemuel	Pulaski Robinsons	79	10	Monroe	Pike County	Upson Co.
Waldhauer, Israel F.	Effingham 9th Dist.	106	11	Monroe	Lamar Co.	
Walker, David	Columbia Shaws	7	9	Monroe	Pike County	
Walker, Elis	Washington Currys	349	13	Monroe		
Walker, Elizabeth (Wid)	Laurens Smiths	237	11	Monroe	Pike County	Upson Co.
Walker, George	Wilkes Mirees	195	1	Monroe	Pike County	
Walker, George B.	Columbia Shaws	132	2	Monroe	Pike County	
Walker, George Sr.	Pulaski McPhails	208	7	Monroe	Lamar Co.	
Walker, James	Wilkes Mirees	7	7	Monroe	Pike County	Lamar Co.
Walker, Jeptha F.	Putnam Walkers	15	6	Monroe		
Walker, Mary (Wid)	Talleys	166	2	Monroe	Pike County	
Walker, Moses	Burke Dillards	81	2	Monroe	Pike County	Spalding Co.
Walker, Rowland	Laurens Deens	169	10	Monroe	Pike County	Upson Co.
Walker, Samuel	Morgan Lawsons	146	12	Monroe		
Walker, Sanders	Putnam Walkers	208	4	Monroe	Butts Co.	
Walker, Willis J.	Jasper Pollards	5	3	Monroe	Pike County	
Walkers, Mathew	Jones Pitts	229	13	Monroe	Bibb Co.	
Wall, Drury	Rabun Perryjohns	220	10	Monroe	Pike County	Upson Co.
Wall, Jesse	Rabun Perryjohns	183	6	Monroe		
Wall, William	Twiggs Thames	72	13	Monroe		
Wallace, Charnel	Bryan Demeres	84	12	Monroe		
Wallace, George Jr.	Laurens Deens	30	6	Monroe		
Wallace, James	Lincoln Leveretts	313	13	Monroe	Bibb Co.	
Wallace, John (Orp)	Morgan Sheppards	55	5	Monroe		
Wallace, Luther	Oglethorpe Cardwells	199	3	Monroe	Lamar Co.	
Waller, David S.	Jasper Burneys	33	12	Monroe		
Waller, Elizabeth (Wid)	Hancock Gilberts	36	5	Monroe		
Wallice, Reuben	Clarke McKelroys	124	3	Monroe	Pike County	
Walls, Charles	Gwinnett Bridges	154	7	Monroe	Lamar Co.	
Walls, Wm.	Jackson Spruces	195	7	Monroe	Lamar Co.	
Walter, Adair	Habersham Words	255	9	Monroe	Pike County	
Walter, James	Columbia Shaws	294	13	Monroe	Bibb Co.	
Walthall, Edward	Jasper "Martins	211	15	Monroe	Pike County	Upson Co.
Wammack, Wyche	Pulaski Regans	252	2	Monroe	Pike County	Lamar Co.
Wansley, Nelson	Elbert Wards	139	1	Monroe	Pike County	
Wansley, Thomas	Elbert, Wards	158	7	Monroe	Lamar Co.	
Ward, Benjamin F.	Clarke, Browns	33	9	Monroe	Pike County	
Ward, Ichabud	Camden Baileys	156	13	Monroe		
Ward, Mary (Wid)	Jackson Hansons	242	13	Monroe	Bibb Co.	
Ward, Powel	Greene Greers	137	9	Monroe	Pike County	
Ware, Hutson T.	Morgan Lawsons	253	1	Monroe	Pike County	
Ware, John H.	Baldwin Malcolms	93	3	Monroe	Pike County	
Ware, Nicholas	Richmond Burtons	175	7	Monroe	Lamar Co.	
Ware, Robert Dawson	Columbia Clietts	55	10	Monroe	Pike County	Upson Co.
Warnuck, Littleberry	Jefferson Fleming	98	6	Monroe		
Warren, James Sr.	Emanuel Griffins	216	3	Monroe	Lamar Co.	
Warren, Wilson	Twiggs Blackshear	173	9	Monroe	Pike County	
Warthen, James	Wilkes Hudspeths	305	13	Monroe	Bibb Co.	
Water, Margaret (Wid)	Walton Richs	207	7	Monroe	Lamar Co.	
Waters, Isaac	Bulloch Hagins	75	2	Monroe	Pike County	Spalding Co.
Watkins, Benj.	Oglethorpe Thorntons	123	6	Monroe		
Watkins, Jesse	Richmond Burtons	246	1	Monroe	Pike County	
Watkins, Joseph	Elbert Terrells	315	13	Monroe	Bibb Co.	
Watkins, Philip	Oglethorpe Thorntons	70	6	Monroe		
Watley, Archey	Gwinnett Dobbs	161	7	Monroe	Lamar Co.	
Watson, Andrew	Habersham McCrarys	250	10	Monroe	Pike County	Upson Co.
Watson, Elisha	Oglethorpe 226th	82	13	Monroe		
Watson, James	Columbia Cochrans	204	11	Monroe	Pike County	Upson Co.
Watson, John	Walton Wests	158	9	Monroe	Pike County	
Watson, John (Shff)	Baldwin Doles	117	5	Monroe		
Watson, Joseph	Gwinnett Davis	98	4	Monroe	Butts Co.	
Watson, Joseph (Orps)	Columbia Cochrans	8	6	Monroe		
Watson, Obadiah	Jackson Flanagans	253	6	Monroe		
Watson, Sanders	Franklin Turks	318	13	Monroe	Bibb Co.	
Watts, Hampton B.	Greene Allens	63	15	Monroe	Pike County	Upson Co.
Watts, Jacob	Twiggs Houses	163	6	Monroe		
Watts, Ludwell	Jasper Ryans	78	11	Monroe		
Watts, Thomas R.	Morgan Shaws	126	6	Monroe		
Weatherby, Benj.	Jones Coxs	174	9	Monroe	Pike County	
Weatherford, John	Morgan Harris	107	2	Monroe	Pike County	Spalding Co.
Weatherington, John	Twiggs Chains	112	15	Monroe	Pike County	Upson Co.
Weatherly, Wm.	Clarke Fosters	217	12	Monroe		
Weathers, Elizabeth (Wid)`	Twiggs Batemans	92	7	Monroe	Pike County	Lamar Co.
Weathers, William	Greene Woodhams	138	15	Monroe	Pike County	Upson Co.
Weaver, Jonathan	Early Hairs	119	10	Monroe	Pike County	Upson Co.
Weaver, Wm. B.	Oglethorpe Huffs	192	4	Monroe	Butts Co.	
Webb, Elias	Jefferson Watkins	41	6	Monroe		
Webb, Homer	Hancock Loyds	173	12	Monroe		
Webb, Horatio	Jackson Olivers	70	3	Monroe	Pike County	
Webb, Thomas (Orps)	Putnam Mehones	226	13	Monroe		
Webber, John (Orph)	Effingham 11th Dist.	67	8	Monroe	Pike County	Lamar Co.
Weeks, Theophilus	Camden Bates	66	10	Monroe	Pike County	Upson Co.
Welburn, Robert	Wilkinson Williams	86	11	Monroe		
Weldon, Isaac	Jasper Pollards	171	1	Monroe	Pike County	
Wellborn, Carlton	Wilkes Wellborns	28	7	Monroe	Pike County	Lamar Co.
Wellborn, Jack	Greene Allens	93	11	Monroe		
Wells, Elijah	Putnam Jurnigans	131	3	Monroe	Lamar Co.	
Wells, James (Orph)	Oglethorpe Cardwells	117	3	Monroe	Pike County	Spalding Co.
Wells, Jermiah	Telfair Lamkins	242	7	Monroe	Lamar Co.	
West, William	Burke Cavenahs	26	13	Monroe		
Westbrook, Stephen (Orph)	Franklin S. Harris	147	8	Monroe	Pike County	
Westerman, Ann E. (Orph)	Chatham Thiess	207	6	Monroe		
Westmoreland, John	Jasper 365 Dist.	167	1	Monroe	Pike County	
Weston, Ezekeil	Burke Sapps	207	2	Monroe	Pike County	Spalding Co.
Wetherby, Saml.	Chatham Thiesss	8	13	Monroe		
Whaley, John K.	Laurens Stevens	17	9	Monroe	Pike County	
Whaley, Thomas	Hancock Feens	116	9	Monroe	Pike County	
Whatley, Richard (Orp)	Jones Burkhalter	235	12	Monroe		
Whatley, Seaborn	Wilkes Mattoxs	72	5	Monroe		
Whatley, Wiley T.	Morgan Whitakers	133	5	Monroe		
Whatley, Willis	Clarke Dickens	153	5	Monroe		
Wheater, Robert M.	Wilkes Freemans	117	6	Monroe		
Whelus, Miles	Oglethorpe Bells	71	10	Monroe	Pike County	Upson Co.
Whitaker, Samuel	Washington Barges	205	7	Monroe	Lamar Co.	
White, Abraham	Hancock Swints	192	10	Monroe	Pike County	Upson Co.
White, Ann (Wid)	Jasper Whites	183	4	Monroe	Butts Co.	
White, Benj.	Morgan Wagnons	166	5	Monroe		
White, Daniel	Hancock Colemans	108	5	Monroe		
White, Effy	Elbert Merritts	8	1	Monroe	Pike County	Spalding Co.
White, Elizabeth (Wid)	Elbert Ruckers	2	10	Monroe	Pike County	Upson Co.
White, Peter	Chatham Mills	57	2	Monroe	Pike County	
White, Thomas	Columbia Wrights	12	5	Monroe		
White, William N.	Jasper Whites	334	13	Monroe	Bibb Co.	
Whitehead, George Sr.	Clarke McKelroys	192	7	Monroe	Lamar Co.	
Whitehead, John (Orps)	Twiggs Batemans	57	3	Monroe	Pike County	
Whitfield, Allums	Baldwin Doles	228	15	Monroe	Pike County	Upson Co.
Whitman, William	Hall Buffingtons	76	5	Monroe		
Whitton, George	Lincoln Levretts	98	7	Monroe	Pike County	Lamar Co.
Whitworth, Hiram	Madison Stricklands	221	2	Monroe	Pike County	Lamar Co.
Whitworth, Winston	Franklin Seals	96	1	Monroe	Pike County	Spalding Co.
Whorton, Wm. S	Madison Leepers	253	2	Monroe	Pike County	Lamar Co.
Wicker, Phillip	Pulaski Roachs	8	10	Monroe	Pike County	Upson Co.
Wicker, Thomas	Richmond Luthers	166	13	Monroe	Bibb Co.	
Wickers, Julius (Orps)	Baldwin -	122	8	Monroe	Pike County	
Wicks, Platt L.	Chatham Raifords	149	1	Monroe	Pike County	
Wiggins, John	Appling Bryans	163	1	Monroe	Pike County	
Wilborn, James	Greene Nelms	253	11	Monroe	Pike County	Upson Co.
Wilbourn, Robert	Wilkinson Williams	155	3	Monroe	Lamar Co.	
Wilcox, James	Richmond Burtons	29	7	Monroe	Pike County	Lamar Co.
Wiley, Isaac H (orph)	Hancock Johnsons	36	12	Monroe		
Wiley, John Sr.	adison Bones	132	13	Monroe		
Wiley, Sampson	Jasper Newtons	22	15	Monroe	Pike County	Upson Co.
Wilkerson, Carter	Lincoln Stokes	151	3	Monroe	Lamar Co.	
Wilkes, Tabitha (Wid)	Emanuel Griffins	131	7	Monroe	Pike County	Lamar Co.
Wilkins, James	Hancock Colemans	66	5	Monroe		
Wilkins, John	Warren Wilders	197	1	Monroe	Pike County	
Wilkins, Samuel	Columbia Griffins	134	11	Monroe	Lamar Co.	
Willhite, John	Richmond Luthers	230	5	Monroe		
Williams, Benjamin	Wilkes Johnsons	117	13	Monroe		
Williams, David	Washington Eckles	16	12	Monroe		
Williams, Delly (Wid)	Bulloch Williams	192	9	Monroe	Pike County	
Williams, Denton	Hall Millers	337	13	Monroe	Bibb Co.	
Williams, Ester (Wid)	Warren Wilders	112	12	Monroe		
Williams, Fedrick H	Greene Mercers	223	13	Monroe		
Williams, Frederick	Telfair Wilcox	30	9	Monroe	Pike County	
Williams, Harriet Eliza (Orph)	Camden Clarks	183	10	Monroe	Pike County	Upson Co.
Williams, Henry E	Oglethorpe Jewells	272	12	Monroe		
Williams, Henry W. (Orph)	Chatham Thiess	24	3	Monroe	Pike County	Spalding Co.
Williams, Jacob	Twiggs Griffins	228	9	Monroe	Pike County	
Williams, Jane W. (Wid)	Burke Powells	198	11	Monroe	Pike County	Upson Co.
Williams, John	Greene Allens	189	1	Monroe	Pike County	
Williams, John	Jones Haws	200	2	Monroe	Pike County	Lamar Co.
Williams, John	Putnam Johnsons	36	15	Monroe	Pike County	Upson Co.
Williams, Joseph	Twiggs Thames	243	13	Monroe	Bibb Co.	
Williams, Joseph	Twiggs Thames	244	13	Monroe	Bibb Co.	
Williams, McCree	Twiggs Bosemans	142	4	Monroe	Butts Co.	
Williams, Priscilla (Orp)	Laurens Mathers	191	2	Monroe	Pike County	Lamar Co.
Williams, Stephen Sr.	Clarke Hightowers	171	3	Monroe		
Williams, Thomas Jr.	Washington Floyds	170	7	Monroe	Lamar Co.	
Williams, Timothy	Clarke Stewarts	264	12	Monroe		
Williams, Timothy	Clarke Stewarts	107	15	Monroe	Pike County	Upson Co.
Williams, Wiley W.	Jasper Whites	10	8	Monroe	Pike County	Lamar Co.
Williams, William	Putnam Cowles	170	3	Monroe	Lamar Co.	
Williams, William	Walton Echols	190	13	Monroe		
Williams, William T.	Gwinnett Dobbs	32	8	Monroe	Pike County	Lamar Co.
Williamson, Andrew (Orps)	Gwinnett Tippins	155	6	Monroe		
Williamson, Adam	Jackson Hanson	187	7	Monroe	Lamar Co.	
Williamson, Anna (Wid)	Hancock Colemans	90	3	Monroe	Pike County	
Williamson, James	Clarke Fosters	190	4	Monroe	Butts Co.	
Williamson, Lidia (Wid)	Emanuel Jordens	28	14	Monroe		
Williamson, Michleberry	Screven Burnes	119	13	Monroe		
Williamson, Reubin	Jasper Newtons	158	1	Monroe	Pike County	
Williamson, Thomas	Putnam Johnsons	94	6	Monroe		
Williamson, Thomas	Putnam Johnsons	107	8	Monroe	Pike County	
Williamson, Thos. E	Clarke Fosters	258	9	Monroe	Pike County	
Willibee, Wm.	Jasper Thorntons	112	14	Monroe		
Willingham, Thos	Jasper 365th Dist.	266	10	Monroe	Pike County	Upson Co.
Willis, Joel Jr	Jones Pitts	122	13	Monroe		
Willis, Joseph	Jefferson Waldons	59	2	Monroe	Pike County	
Willoby, William (Orps)	Franklin Seals	201	8	Monroe	Pike County	
Willson, John	Hall Wallaces	96	7	Monroe	Pike County	Lamar Co.
Willson, Joseph	Jasper Martins	23	6	Monroe		
Willson, Joseph	Jasper Newtons	29	13	Monroe		
Willson, William	Jasper Newtons	244	9	Monroe	Pike County	
Wilson, Elias	Jasper Wallis	110	13	Monroe		
Wilson, Elizabeth (Wid)	Baldwin Doziers	286	13	Monroe		
Wilson, Jacob	Hancock Simms	45	4	Monroe		
Wilson, James Jr.	Elbert Dooleys	267	13	Monroe	Bibb Co.	
Wilson, John L.	Elbert Doolys	216	3	Monroe	Lamar Co.	
Winborn, David	Washington Wimberlys	103	9	Monroe	Pike County	
Winfrey, James L	Greene Winfields	218	1	Monroe	Pike County	
Winn, John Sr.	Madison Griffiths	215	10	Monroe	Pike County	Upson Co.
Wise, Burrell	Warren Jones	33	13	Monroe		
Wise, Joel	Jasper Dardens	245	6	Monroe		
Wise, Nancy (Wid)	Twiggs Tysons	123	12	Monroe		
Wisenberger, John Orps	Effingham 9th Dist.	149	10	Monroe	Pike County	Upson Co.
Wolf, Stephen	Chatham Mills	79	14	Monroe		
Wood, David	Chatham Thiess	64	13	Monroe		
Wood, William	Walton Echols	238	3	Monroe		
Wood, William	Morgan Shaws	202	7	Monroe	Lamar Co.	
Wood, Wm. A	Richmond Burtons	180	3	Monroe		
Woodall, John	Jones Hansford	211	10	Monroe	Pike County	Upson Co.
Woodard, Robert	Morgan Whitakers	30	4	Monroe		
Woodard, Wm. (Orps)	Putnam Brooks	50	11	Monroe		
Woodruff, Israel	Chatham Raifords	136	2	Monroe	Pike County	
Woods, Agrippa (Orp)	Madison Vineyards	152	1	Monroe	Pike County	
Woods, Francis	Madison Griffiths	171	11	Monroe	Pike County	Upson Co.
Woods, John	Jefferson Dodds	23	2	Monroe	Pike County	Spalding Co.
Woods, Richard	Wilkes Joseys	84	6	Monroe		
Woods, Robert Sr.	Madison Griffiths	176	4	Monroe	Butts Co.	
Woodson, Marymon J	Jones Flowers	29	5	Monroe		
Wooten, Councis	Twiggs Batemans	20	15	Monroe	Pike County	Upson Co.
Wooten, James W.	Greene Rankins	261	13	Monroe	Bibb Co.	
Wornum, Charles	Jones Greshams	166	3	Monroe	Lamar Co.	
Wornum, Joshua	Habersham Words	237	3	Monroe		
Worrell, Wm.	Putnam Bledsoes	186	1	Monroe	Pike County	
Worsham, John G.	Baldwin Stephens	227	6	Monroe		
Worsham, William	Greene Nelms	198	7	Monroe	Lamar Co.	
Worthy, Anderson	Franklin Tates	132	15	Monroe	Pike County	Upson Co.
Wray, John	Morgan Harris	127	12	Monroe		
Wrenn, John	Jefferson Connells	115	1	Monroe	Pike County	Spalding Co.
Wright, Abednigo	Pulaski Yarbroughs	150	6	Monroe		
Wright, Habbakuks (Orps)	Columbia Wilsons	38	1	Monroe	Pike County	Spalding Co.
Wright, James	Richmond Wares	13	1	Monroe	Pike County	Spalding Co.
Wright, James	Laurens Mathers	77	1	Monroe	Pike County	Spalding Co.
Wright, Jesse	Wilkinson Williams	18	13	Monroe		
Wright, John	Jackson Knoxs	187	11	Monroe	Pike County	
Wright, John	Greene Astins	149	15	Monroe	Pike County	Upson Co.
Wright, John (Orps)	Oglethorpe Bells	311	13	Monroe	Bibb Co.	
Wright, Kitty (Wid)	Richmond Winters	212	7	Monroe	Lamar Co.	
Wright, Pleasant	Putnam Brooks	222	13	Monroe		
Wright, Reuben, Sr.	Putnam Brooks	120	7	Monroe	Pike County	Lamar Co.
Wright, Richd. W. F.	Putnam Leggets	147	2	Monroe	Pike County	Spalding Co.
Wright, Robert M	Hancock Claytons	237	2	Monroe	Pike County	Spalding Co.
Wright, Samuel	Lincoln Walkers	75	15	Monroe	Pike County	Upson Co.
Wright, Sarah (Wid)	Oglethorpe 235th	239	15	Monroe	Pike County	Upson Co.
Wright, Solomon (Orps)	Washington Wimberly	139	15	Monroe	Pike County	Upson Co.
Wright, Tabitha	Greene Woodhams	88	9	Monroe	Pike County	
Wright, William	Putnam Johnsons	135	12	Monroe		
Wright, William Jr.	Lincoln Jones	74	11	Monroe	Lamar Co.	
Wrights, William	Putnam Johnsons	48	3	Monroe	Pike County	Spalding Co.
Wyatt, Kader (Orps)	Burke Seegars -	206	2	Monroe	Pike County	Spalding Co.
Wynn, Robert (Orps)	Baldwin Doziers	67	1	Monroe	Pike County	Spalding Co.
Wynn, Thomas	Glynn Manning	177	12	Monroe		
Wynn, William	Jones Huffs	63	9	Monroe	Pike County	
Wynn, William (Orps)	Burke Jourdans	201	1	Monroe	Pike County	
Wynne, William	Burke McCullers	199	7	Monroe	Lamar Co.	
Yancey, Robert W. W.	Pulaski Roachs	95	4	Monroe	Butts Co.	
Yarbrough, Edward	Rabun Millers	54	7	Monroe	Pike County	Lamar Co.
Yarbrough, Edward	Rabun Millers	89	13	Monroe		
Yarbrough, Lewis	Pulaski Yarbroughs	188	10	Monroe	Pike County	Upson Co.
Yarbrough, Samuel, Jr.	Warren Huberts	329	13	Monroe	Bibb Co.	
Yearta, Samuel (Orps)	Pulaski Roachs	139	12	Monroe		
Yearty, Abraham (Orps)	Pulaski Robisons	132	5	Monroe		
Yon, Patrick	Pulaski Lanairs	88	11	Monroe		
York, Henry	Jackson Stricklands	71	9	Monroe	Pike County	
Young, Alexander	Burke McKays	270	12	Monroe		
Young, Benjamin A	Jones Permenters	175	11	Monroe	Pike County	Upson Co.
Young, Earnest l	Jones Flowers	161	6	Monroe		
Young, Isaac	Effingham 10th	167	3	Monroe	Lamar Co.	
Young, Isaac	Twiggs Houses	82	8	Monroe	Pike County	Lamar Co.
Young, James	Wilkinson Jordans	130	12	Monroe		
Young, John L.	Columbia Cochrans	12	14	Monroe	Butts Co.	
Young, Moses W.	Oglethorpe Cardwells	11	3	Monroe	Pike County	Spalding Co.
Young, Rebecca (Wid)	Jefferson Connells	60	11	Monroe		
Young, Thomas	Columbia Cochrans	95	1	Monroe	Pike County	Spalding Co.
Young, William D.	Laurens Milton	106	1	Monroe	Pike County	Spalding Co.
Zelander, George	Lincoln Walkers	247	13	Monroe	Bibb Co.	
Zellars, John	Lincoln Watkins	50	1	Monroe	Pike County	Spalding Co.
Zittrour, George	Effingham 11th	157	15	Monroe	Pike County	Upson Co.
Zittrour, John R.	Effingham 12th	101	1	Monroe	Pike County	Spalding Co.

== See also ==
- Georgia Land Lotteries
  - 1805 Land Lottery
  - 1807 Land Lottery
  - 1820 Land Lottery
  - 1827 Land Lottery
  - 1832 Land Lottery
  - Gold Lottery of 1832
  - 1833 Fractions Lottery
- Georgia resolutions 1827
- Indian removal
