= List of gold mines in the United States =

This list of gold mines in the United States is subsidiary to the list of mines article and lists working, defunct and future mines in the country and is organised by the primary mineral output. For practical purposes stone, marble and other quarries may be included in this list.

== Pacific Northwest ==
- Alaska-Gastineau Mine
- Bodie Mine
- Boundary Red Mountain Mine
- Lone Jack mine
- Fort Knox Gold Mine (active)
- Kensington mine

== California ==
- Empire Mine (California; inactive)
- Keane Wonder Mine
- Kennedy Mine
- Malakoff Mine (California; inactive)
- McLaughlin Mine
- Monte Cristo Gold Mine
- North Bloomfield Mining and Gravel Company
- North Star Mine
- Sweet Vengeance Mine (inactive)

== Rocky Mountains ==
- Atlantic Cable Quartz Lode
- Cripple Creek & Victor Gold Mine (active)
- Golden Sunlight mine (active)

== Nevada ==
- Cortez Gold Mine (active)
- Getchell Mine (active)
- Goldstrike mine (active)
- Homestake Mine (Nevada)
- Marigold mine (active)
- Red Hill mine
- Round Mountain Gold Mine
- Twin Creeks Gold Mine (active)

== Arizona ==
- Commonwealth Mine
- Congress Mine
- Vulture Mine

== Midwest ==
- Homestake Mine (South Dakota)

== Mid-Atlantic ==
- Greenwood Gold Mine
- Reed Gold Mine
- Haile Gold Mine (South Carolina; active)

== Georgia ==
- Battle Branch Mine
- Calhoun Mine
- Consolidated Mine
- Crisson Mine
- Franklin-Creighton Mine
- Free Jim Mine
- Loud Mine
- Sixes mine

== See also ==
- List of gold mines in Georgia
