= List of gold mines in Georgia =

This is a list of gold mines in the U.S. state of Georgia, all of which are inactive. Most of the mines were discovered in the late 1820s and 1830s during the Georgia Gold Rush, and make up what is known as the Georgia Gold Belt.

Mine name	County	Years active
Battle Branch Mine	Lumpkin County	1831 to
Calhoun Mine	Lumpkin County	1828 to 1941
Consolidated Gold Mine	Lumpkin County	1828 to 1906
Crisson Mine	Lumpkin County	1847 to 1980s
Franklin-Creighton Mine	Cherokee County	1832 to 1913
Free Jim Mine	Lumpkin County	
Loud Mine	White County	
Sixes mine	Cherokee County	
