= Sixes mine =

Former gold placer mines in Georgia, U.S.

- Location within Georgia
- Location: Georgia, United States; 34.18389°N 84.55639°W
- Opened: 1819

The Sixes Mine is a group of former gold placer mines in the Georgia Gold Belt. They are near Sixes in Cherokee County, Georgia, United States, located off Bell's Ferry Road, south of Canton, Georgia.

== History ==
The Sixes Mine was originally worked by the Cherokee and was located near the Cherokee town called Sixes. It may have been in operation as early as 1819 and would therefore predate the Georgia Gold Rush. The discovery of six gold mines was the reason why the Cherokee Nation was forced off their land. The Trail of Tears march began in Cherokee County approximately 2 miles (3.2 km) from where Sixes Mine is located. After the Cherokee Nation was driven off their land, the Georgia Land Lottery of 1832 took place, which granted 40-acre (160,000 m^{2}) plots of land to Georgia residents who were fortunate enough to win the lottery. One such winner was Mrs. Mary G. Franklin, founder of the Franklin-Creighton Mine.

The six mines that comprised the Sixes are the

- Three Hundred and One,
- Cherokee, Clarkston,
- Downing Creek Placer Mine,
- Macou Project,
- Putnam Mine.

== Current status ==
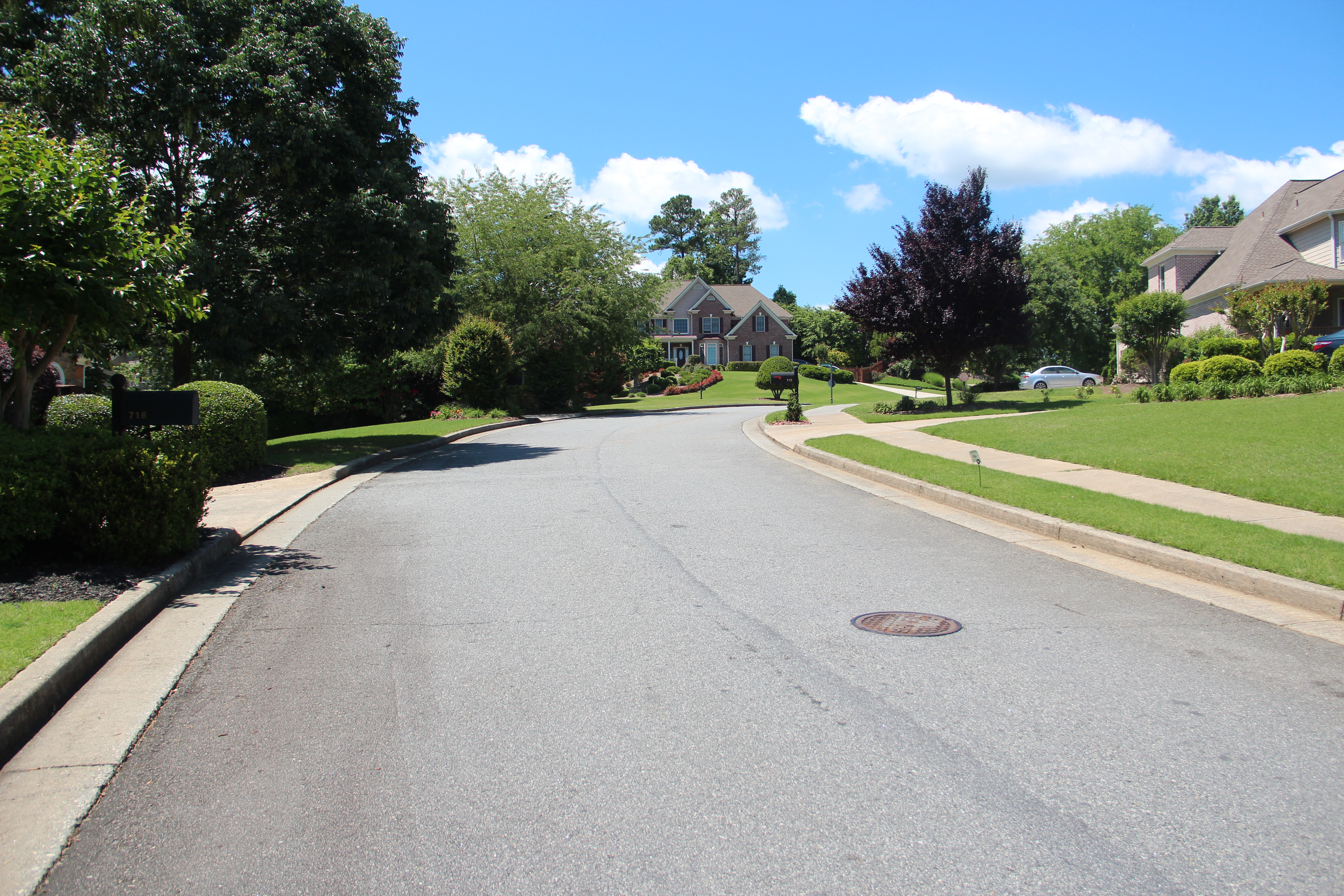
The Sixes mine site in 2017, currently covered by the BridgeMill subdivision

The Sixes mine and Downing Creek Placer mines were both located in what is now the BridgeMill planned community. The Downing Creek Placer mine is located on private property on Downing Creek Court.

The Three Hundred and One mine was located on county plat 301, 15th district.

The Cherokee Mine is located off Wooten Drive on Army Corps of Engineers property. Public access is difficult, and there is no easy approach. The mine can be accessed by boat on Allatoona Lake up Sixes Creek, or by foot into the Corps property tree line marked by red blazes on the trees across from the BridgeMill neighborhood swimming pool. Visiting and gold panning is allowed by the Corps, but only panning with shovels and pans in the stream bed.

== Sources ==
- Georgia Historical Marker - "Cherokee County Gold"
