= Crisson Mine =

Gold mine in Georgia, United States

- Location within Georgia
- Location: 34.563994°N 83.965705°W

Crisson Mine was a gold mine in Lumpkin County, Georgia, USA, located just east of Dahlonega. Like many mines in the area, the property probably started as a placer mine during the Georgia Gold Rush. Once the placer deposits had been exhausted, an open pit gold mine was established in 1847 and commercial operations continued until the early 1980s. A small stamp mill was also established here. Much of the gold used for the gold leaf dome of the Georgia State Capitol was mined at this mine, which was among the most productive mines in the Georgia Gold Belt. The mine is located just north of the site of the Consolidated Mine, which is itself north of the Calhoun Mine.

In 1969, the owners of Crisson Mine opened to the public to allow tourists to pan for gold. The ore sold for panning is still crushed by the stamp mill, which is now well over 100 years old. It is likely that panning the ore provided at the mine will yield small amounts of gold (flakes, specks, small nuggets).
