= Montgomery Creek =

Montgomery Creek may refer to:

- Montgomery Creek, California
- Montgomery Creek (Georgia)
- Montgomery Creek (Boone County, Iowa)
- Montgomery Creek (Wisconsin) is a tributary of the Clam River (Wisconsin)
- Montgomery Creek (Ontario) is a tributary of Oshawa Creek, in Ontario
