= Georgia Land Lotteries =

American land redistribution lotteries

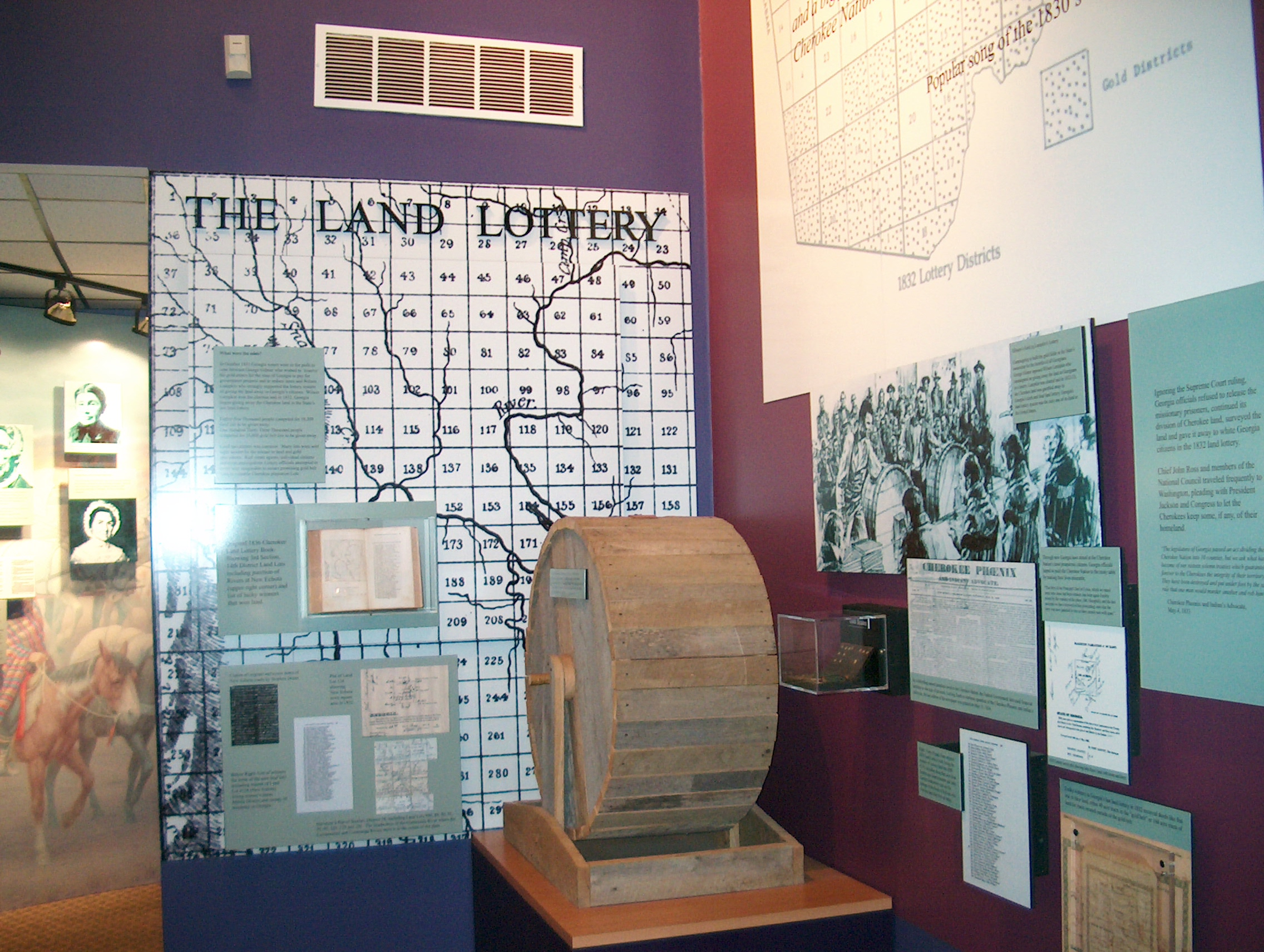
The Land Lottery display at New Echota, former capital of the Cherokee nation.

The Georgia land lotteries were an early nineteenth century system of land redistribution in Georgia. Under this system, settlers could register for a chance to win lots of land that had been expropriated by the State of Georgia or the Federal government from the Muscogee Nation and the Cherokee Nation. The lottery system was utilized by the State of Georgia between the years 1805 and 1833 “to strengthen the state and increase the population in order to increase Georgia's power in the House of Representatives.” Although some other states used land lotteries, none were implemented at the scale of the Georgia contests. The Georgia Land Lotteries were generally restricted to free white men, with special rules relating to soldiers, widows, and children.

== Land areas ==
Land lots were surveyed in five different sizes based on the perceived quality of the land. In 1805, land lots were 202.5 acres (0.8 km^{2}) and 490 acres (2.0 km^{2}). In 1807, land lots were 202.5 acres (0.8 km^{2}). In 1820, land lots were 250 acres (1.0 km^{2}) and 490 acres (2.0 km^{2}). In 1821, land lots were 202.5 acres (0.8 km^{2}). In the 1832 Land Lottery area, land lots were 160 acres (0.6 km^{2}), while in the 1832 Gold Lottery area, land lots were 40 acres (0.2 km^{2}).

== History of system ==
Prior to 1803, Georgia distributed land via a headright system. Though designed to prohibit corruption, the system actually encouraged it. During early administration, the government abused this system and created what today is generally known as the Yazoo land scandal. The much-abused "headright" system resulted in the adoption of the lottery system in May 1803, under governor John Milledge. The first lottery occurred in 1805. For each person subscribing to a lottery, a ticket was placed in the barrel or wheel. Since each lottery was over-subscribed, tickets were added to compensate for the over-subscription.

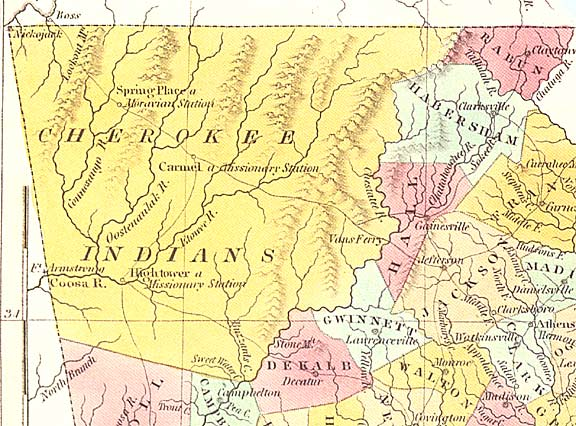
1830 map of the Cherokee Nation.

In October 1831, Georgia voters went to the polls to vote between Governor George Gilmer and Wilson Lumpkin. Gilmer wished to reserve the Cherokee land, which contained several gold mines, for the State of Georgia in order to pay for government projects and reduce taxes. Lumpkin strongly supported giving away the lands (in what would become the State's last three land lotteries).

== Forced relocation of Muscogee and Cherokee peoples ==
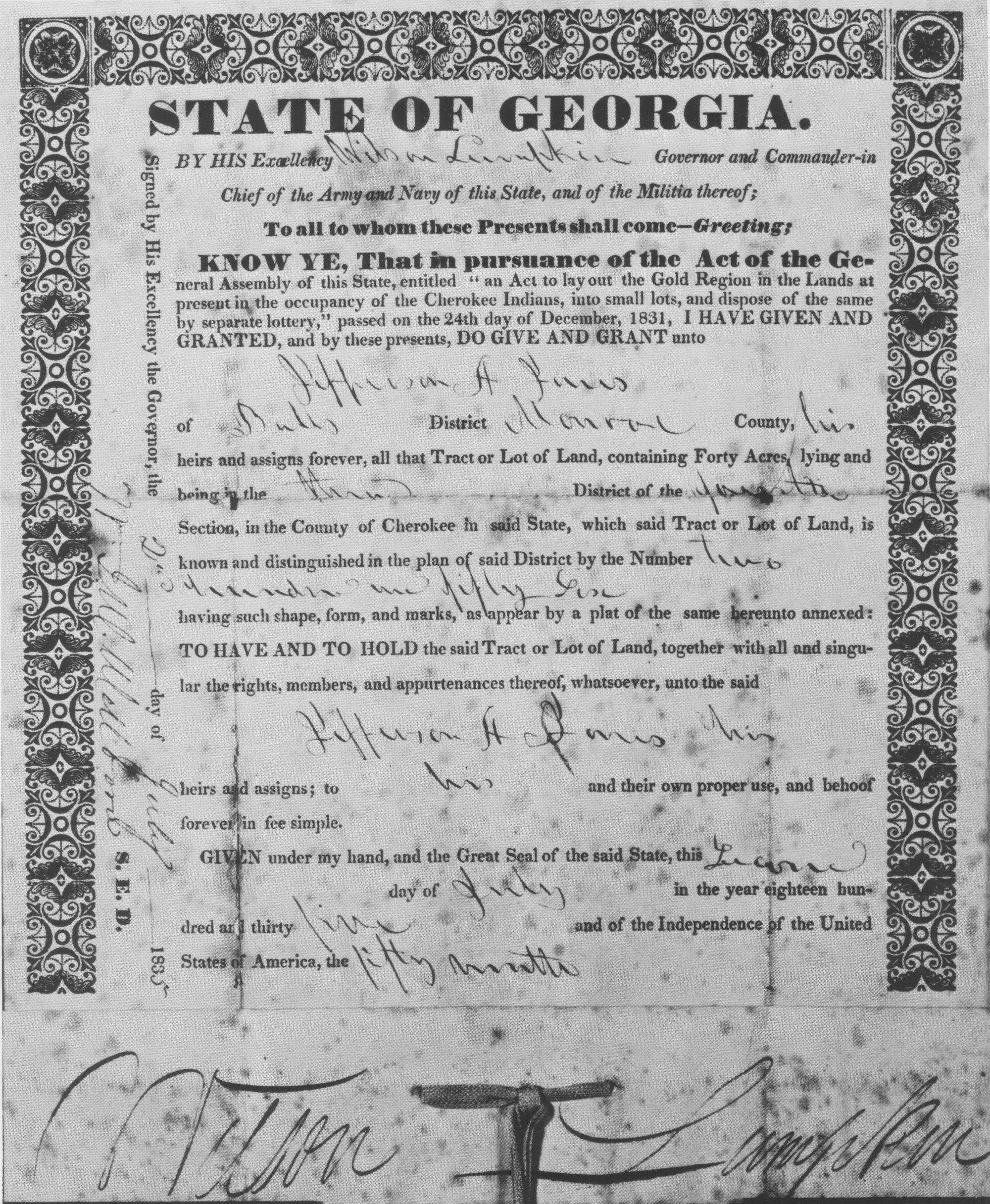
Grant issued to a drawer in the Cherokee Land Lottery of 1832, which dispersed the former Cherokee property among the white settlers in Georgia.

In an effort to keep their ancestral lands, certain Cherokees (and other interested parties)—including John Ross, Samuel Worcester and Major Ridge—took their fight against the State of Georgia to the United States Supreme Court. There were two major cases heard by the Court during the years of 1831 through 1832: Cherokee Nation v. Georgia and Worcester v. Georgia. Although the U.S. Supreme Court initially ruled against the sovereignty of the Cherokee Nation in Cherokee Nation v. Georgia, the U.S. Supreme Court later granted sovereignty in Worcester v. Georgia, resulting in the invalidation of the Indian Removal Act. U.S. President Andrew Jackson and the State of Georgia chose instead to ignore the Supreme Court ruling, a clearly unconstitutional action at least since the 1803 ruling in Marbury v. Madison. Georgia continued its surveying and division of the Cherokee lands through the final "1832 Land and Gold Lotteries.” President Jackson utilized the U.S. Army, forcing the removal of the Cherokees. This was part of the “Trail of Tears,” which modern historians consider an ethnic cleansing or genocide.

A volunteer soldier from Georgia who participated in the removal recounted:

I fought through the civil war and have seen men shot to pieces and slaughtered by thousands, but the Cherokee removal was the cruelest work I ever knew.

== Speculation ==
Land speculation in the lotteries was common; many lots were sold sight-unseen by the winners for other lots or for gold. Real estate agents, individual citizens and even unscrupulous lottery officials attempted to secure promising gold belt lots or valuable Cherokee plantation lots. During the 1832 Lottery alone, some 85,000 people competed for 18,309 land lots to be given away, and at least 133,000 people competed for 35,000 gold belt lots to be given away.

During the 28 years that the State of Georgia used the lottery system, the rules and the methods of the system remained virtually unchanged. Lottery fees depended on the winning ticket and the size of the lot won, but in general, they only covered the cost of running the lottery. The State did not directly profit from allocating these lands. Fractional lots were sold in each of the lotteries, and some lands, especially those near major rivers, were exempt from the lottery. These were distributed by the State at public auctions.

== Lotteries ==
1. 1805 Land Lottery — This encompassed Muscogee lands just west of the Oconee River ceded to the state in 1802 and a small strip of land in the southeast section of the state, in Baldwin, Wayne, and Wilkinson counties.
2. 1807 Land Lottery — Included additional Muscogee lands in Baldwin County and Wilkinson County.
3. 1820 Land Lottery — After the Creek War (1813–1814), President Jackson demanded from the Muscogee an immense area of land which would become the southern third of the entire state of Georgia. A second section of land in northeast Georgia was included. This other, smaller section defined the eastern end of the Cherokee Nation for 12 years. Land was taken in Appling, Early, Gwinnett, Habersham, Hall, Irwin, Rabun, and Walton counties.
4. 1821 Land Lottery — Further Muscogee cessions which included the future site of Atlanta. Land was taken in Dooly, Fayette, Henry, Houston, and Monroe counties.
5. 1827 Land Lottery — Signaled the end of the Muscogee presence in Georgia. Land was taken in Carroll, Coweta, Lee, Muscogee, and Troup counties.
6. 1832 Land Lottery — This lottery, along with the 1832 Gold Lottery, gave the Cherokee Nation to Georgia settlers, sparking the "Trail of Tears." Land was confiscated in Cass (renamed Bartow), Cherokee, Cobb, Floyd, Forsyth, Gilmer, Lumpkin, Murray, Paulding, and Union counties.
7. 1832 Gold Lottery — By the time of the gold lottery the Georgia Gold Rush was already beginning to wind down. The state did not guarantee that gold existed on the lots given away.
8. 1833 Fractions Lottery — The State of Georgia held one final land lottery in December, 1833, to distribute fractions from the Cherokee territory and other remaining lots not drawn in previous lotteries.

== See also ==
- Cherokee removal
- Georgia resolutions 1827
- Trail of Tears
