= Louds =

Louds may refer to:

- Louds Island, in the Atlantic Ocean off the coast of Round Pond, Maine
- Shout Out Louds, indie rock band from Stockholm, Sweden
- The Louds, family in the documentary An American Family
- The Loud family, from the Nickelodeon series The Loud House

== See also ==
- Loud (disambiguation)
- Loudes
