= 1832 Land Lottery =

The 1832 Land Lottery was the sixth lottery of the Georgia Land Lotteries, a lottery system used by the U.S. state of Georgia between the years 1805 and 1833 to redistribute confiscated Cherokee and Muscogee land to white settlers. The 1832 lottery was authorized by the Georgia General Assembly by acts of December 21, 1830 and December 24, 1831. The lottery redistributed Cherokee land in Cass (renamed Bartow), Cherokee, Cobb, Floyd, Forsyth, Gilmer, Lumpkin, Murray, Paulding, and Union counties.

The lots were 160 acres in size. Registration for the lottery occurred in the four months after the Governor's proclamation of February 20, 1832, with drawings occurring in 1832. Fortunate drawers from the previous Georgia land lotteries were excluded, as well as any person who had mined for gold or other metals in Georgia since 1 June 1830, any person who had taken up residence in Cherokee territory, any member or associate of "a horde of Thieves known as the Pony Club", and any person who had been convicted of a felony by a Georgia court.

== See also ==
- Cherokee removal
- Georgia Land Lotteries
  - 1805 Land Lottery
  - 1807 Land Lottery
  - 1820 Land Lottery
  - 1821 Land Lottery
  - 1827 Land Lottery
  - Gold Lottery of 1832
  - 1833 Fractions Lottery
- Georgia resolutions 1827
- Indian removal
