= Auraria, Georgia =

Auraria
- Ghost town
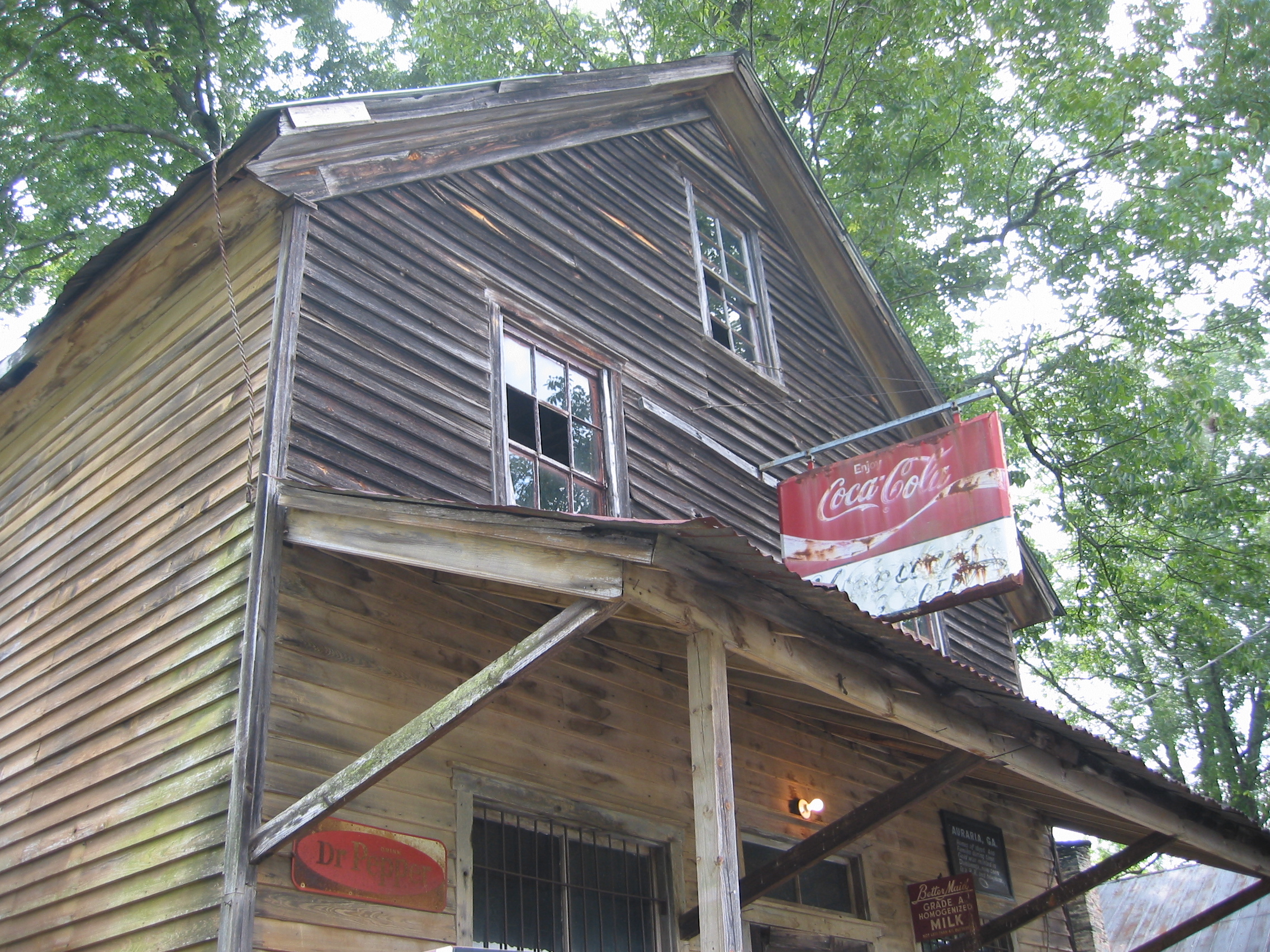
- A store named Woody's

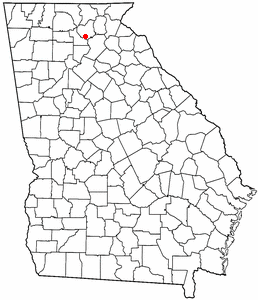
- Location of Auraria, Georgia
- Coordinates: 34°28′29″N 84°1′24″W
- Country: United States
- State: Georgia
- County: Lumpkin County
- Elevation: 426 m (1,398 ft)
- GNIS ID: 354415

Auraria is a ghost town in Lumpkin County, Georgia, United States, southwest of Dahlonega. Its name derives from aurum, the Latin word for gold. In its early days, it was also known variously as Dean, Deans, Nuckollsville, and Scuffle Town.

== History ==
Thousands of settlers came to these former Cherokee lands in search of gold during the Georgia Gold Rush, and following the Gold Lottery of 1832. One of the first gold rush boom towns started in Auraria in June 1832, when William Dean built a cabin between the Chestatee River and Etowah River. As the temporary seat of Lumpkin County in 1832, Nathaniel Nuckolls built a tavern, hotel, and several buildings to house the miners. Within six months of the lottery, "one hundred family dwellings, eighteen or twenty stores, twelve or fifteen law offices, and four or five taverns" were to be found in the town. By May 1833 the town population was 1,000, and 10,000 were in the county.

The land east of Auraria was purchased by Vice President John C. Calhoun, where he established the Calhoun Mine. A traveling companion of Calhoun, Dr. Croft, suggested the town be renamed Aureola, in November 1832. The town citizens chose Auraria, suggested by John Powell.

The banks of the Etowah River, Camp Creek, and Cane Creek had many mines (Barlow Mine, Battle Branch Mine, Ralston Mine, Whim Hill Mine, Hedwig-Chicago Mine, Gold Hill Mine Etowah Mine, and others).

The 40-acre (16 ha) gold lot on which most of Auraria stood was won by John R. Plummer, but his right to participate in the lottery was questioned. Faced with this legal challenge, the lower court judges picked the site north of Auraria near the Cane Creek mining area. Auraria experienced a sharp decline as businesses and county offices relocated. The first session of the Superior Court of Lumpkin County met in what became known as Dahlonega, Georgia on Aug. 22, 1833. Due to its location and political influence, Dahlonega received a federal mint for gold coins.

In 1848, gold was discovered in California. Former Auraria resident Jennie Wimmer, a cook in rural California, was the first person to prove the gold's authenticity, because she was the only person on the scene who knew how to perform the proper tests. This discovery led to the California Gold Rush of 1849. The discovery of gold in California and soon after in Colorado caused Auraria to eventually fade into history. Gold mining in Georgia decreased and eventually all but ceased as miners went west looking for uncharted prospecting. Auraria's population quickly dwindled, and the community deteriorated.

William Greeneberry Russell and a party of men of Auraria who left for Kansas Territory formed the Colorado settlement of Auraria in 1858; the town later merged with Denver.

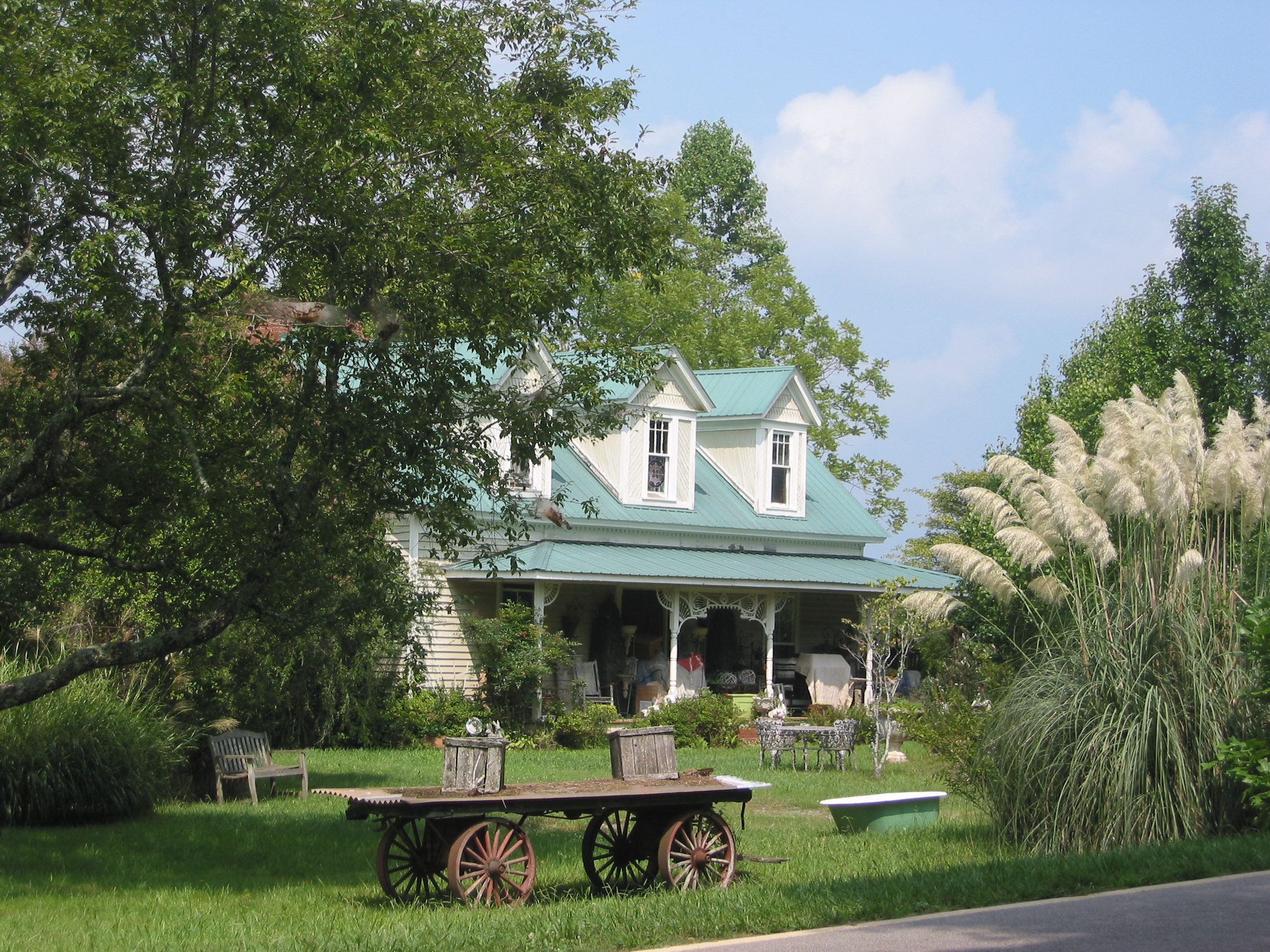
A home in Auraria

== Present day ==
There are still a few old buildings standing: Woody's store at Castleberry Bridge Road, that remained open till the early 1980s; a red house that was once a bank; another house across the street; and a couple of foundations.

== Geography ==
To visit Auraria, travel from the square in Dahlonega on the west road to Dawsonville, pass the college (the gold-domed building is built on the foundation of the old mint). Turn left at the bottom of that hill and continue about 3 miles. The old red house on the left is the bank; after it, there previously was a collapsing building (the remains of which were removed in the early 2010s), which was the old hotel, and just beyond on the left is the old Woody's store. Castleberry Bridge Road to the right leads down to the Etowah River.
