= Loud =

Loud most commonly refers to:

- Loudness, the subjective quality of sound of great intensity

Loud may also refer to:

== Music ==
=== Albums ===
- Loud (Half Japanese album), 1981
- Loud (Rihanna album), 2010
- Loud (Timo Maas album), 2002
- Loud (Wicked Tinkers album), 1999
- Loud, a 2000 album by Lexy & K-Paul
- Loud (EP), by American Pop-Rock band R5

=== Artists ===
- Loud (British band), a British 1990s band
- Loud (Israeli band), an Israeli psytrance music group
- Loud (rapper), a Canadian rapper from Quebec
- Loudness (band), a Japanese rock band

=== Songs ===
- "Loud" (Mac Miller song), 2012
- "Loud" (Shannon Noll song), 2007
- "Loud" (Stan Walker song), 2011
- "Loud" (R5 song), 2013
- "Loud" (Tim Hicks song), 2018
- "Loud", a song by Silk City, featuring GoldLink and Desiigner
- "Loud", a 2007 single by Big & Rich from the album Between Raising Hell and Amazing Grace
- "Loud", a song by Chocolate USA from the 1992 album All Jets Are Gonna Fall Today
- "Loud", a song by Olivia Dean from her 2025 album The Art of Loving
- "Loud", a song by Jessie J from the 2014 album Sweet Talker
- "Loud", a 2006 single by Masters at Work with Beto Cuevas
- "Loud", a song by Matt Nathanson from the 1999 album Still Waiting for Spring
- "Loud", a song by Nmixx from the 2026 EP Heavy Serenade
- "Loud", an additional song by Paulina Rubio included on some reissues of the album Brava!
- "Loud", a song by Reks from his 2016 album The Greatest X
- "Loud", a song by Sammy Hagar from the 2008 album Cosmic Universal Fashion
- "Loud", a collaboration by several artists appearing on the 2012 album The Gates Mixed Plate by Tech N9ne
- "Loud!", a song by Aitch from his 2025 album 4

=== Other music ===
- Loud Records, a subsidiary of SRC Records founded in 1992
- Loud Tour, a 2011 concert tour by Rihanna in support of the album Loud
- Loud Tour (R5), a 2013 concert tour by R5 to promote their EP Loud

== Television ==
- The Loud House, an American animated television series
  - Lincoln Loud, the protagonist of The Loud House
- Loud Kiddington, a character from the animated television show Histeria!
- Loud (South Korean TV series), a South Korean survival reality show
- Stingray Loud, a Canadian TV channel airing music videos
- Loud, a Canadian television show that aired on MuchMusic

== Other uses ==
- Loud (surname)
- LOUD, a 2020 Nigerian musical television film
- Loud Brothers, a defunct American piano manufacturer
- Loud Mine, a gold mine in White County, Georgia
- LOUD Technologies, an American audio equipment manufacturer
- Loud Township, Michigan, U.S.
- River Loud, a river in Lancashire, England
- Loud (esports), a Brazilian esports organisation

== See also ==
- Lloud, a talent agency founded by Lisa of Blackpink
- Louder (disambiguation)
