= Swamp Creek (Nooksack River tributary) =

Creek in Whatcom County, Washington

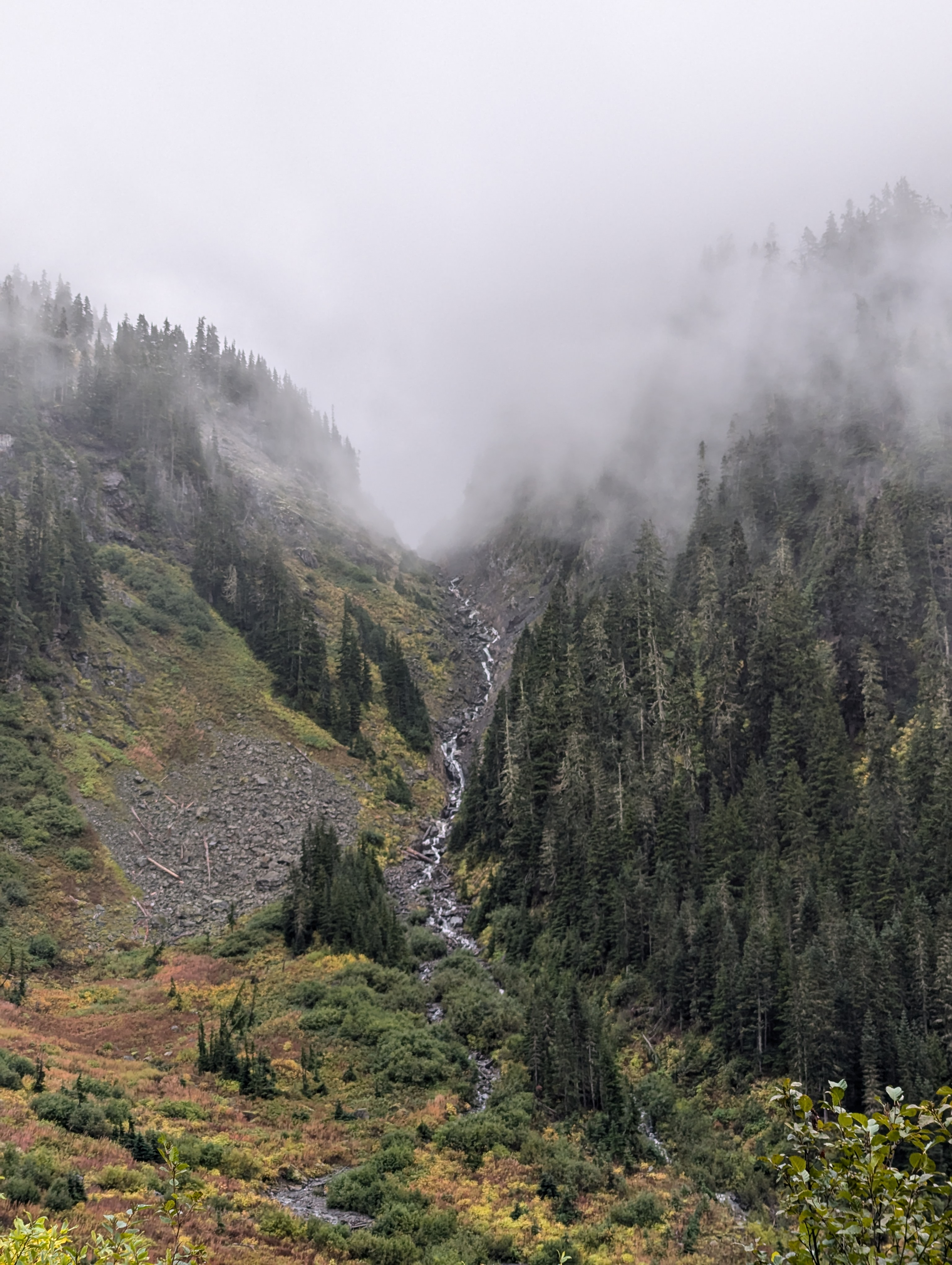
- The upper portion of Swamp Creek flowing down Goat Mountain

Location
- Country: United States
- State: Washington
- Counties: Whatcom

Physical characteristics
- Source: Goat Mountain
  - coordinates: 48°56′1″N 121°38′5″W
- Mouth: Nooksack River
  - coordinates: 48°54′21.4499″N 121°41′18.5100″W
- Basin size: 4,874 acres (1,972 ha)

Swamp Creek is a creek in Whatcom County, Washington. The creek flows from Goat Mountain into the north fork of the Nooksack River, which eventually flows into Bellingham Bay. Six smaller unnamed watercourses flow into Swamp Creek, including the outflow of the Twin Lakes.

The creek is located along State Route 542, 13 miles (21 km) east of Glacier, Washington, and is accessible via Twin Lakes Road. The creek was central in the Mount Baker gold rush, was considered for hydropower, and now is mainly used for recreation, especially by canyoneers.

== History ==
Swamp Creek was central to the Mount Baker gold rush, which lasted from about 1897 to the mid-1930s. Many tent cities popped up along the creek, including Union City at the headwaters, and Gold Hill and Trail City near its confluence with the Nooksack, and by 1898, so many prospectors and miners lived in the area that a new voting precinct was created, called the Swamp Creek precinct.

Hydropower has been an interest on Swamp Creek since the 1940s. In 1941, a paper on water utilization in the Nooksack River was published by the United States Geological Survey, in which was mentioned the possibility for hydropower on Swamp Creek. On April 29, 1981, Stephen J. Gaber filed an application for a preliminary permit for a project to be called the Swamp Creek Hydroelectric Project. The proposal included three rock and earth fill diversion dams feeding a 3,700-foot-long (1,100 m) penstock, leading into a powerhouse with a total capacity of 3.2 megawatts. Gaber estimated the project would produce 13 gigawatt-hours (47 TJ) annually. On October 15, 2010, another application for a preliminary permit was filed, by Clean River Power, LLC. This new project would include a 50-foot-long (15 m), 8-foot-tall (2.4 m) concrete diversion dam, and a 5,200-foot-long (1,600 m) penstock, leading into a powerhouse with a total capacity of 3.5 megawatts, producing an estimated annual 15 GW. In 2011, a coalition of environmental groups filed a formal objection in opposition to the hydroelectric project. As of 2026 no dams have been built.
