= Boisclair =

Boisclair is a surname. Notable people with the surname include:

- André Boisclair (born 1966), Canadian politician
- Bruce Boisclair (born 1952), American baseball player
- James Boisclair, African-American gold miner
- Maxime Boisclair (born 1985), Haitian Canadian ice hockey player
- Nathalie Boisclair, Quebec politician
