= 1833 Fractions Lottery =

The 1833 Fractions Lottery was the eight and final lottery of the Georgia Land Lotteries, a lottery system used by the U.S. state of Georgia between the years 1805 and 1833 to redistribute stolen Cherokee and Muscogee land to white settlers. The 1833 fractions lottery was authorized by the Georgia General Assembly by an act of December 24, 1832. The lottery redistributed land from the original Cherokee territory and twenty-two lots that were not placed into prize wheels during previous lotteries.

The lots varied in size, but the fractional lots left over from the 1832 Land Lottery were smaller than 100 acres and were taken from the 60 land districts and 33 gold districts in Georgia. The fractional lots resulted from irregular boundaries that had prevented measurements of square lots of land. Drawings for the lottery occurred on December 6 and 7 of 1833 for the land lots and on December 9-13 of that year for the gold lots.

== See also ==
- Cherokee removal
- Georgia Land Lotteries
  - 1805 Land Lottery
  - 1807 Land Lottery
  - 1820 Land Lottery
  - 1821 Land Lottery
  - 1827 Land Lottery
  - 1832 Land Lottery
  - Gold Lottery of 1832
- Georgia resolutions 1827
- Indian removal
