= 1805 Land Lottery =

The 1805 Land Lottery was the first lottery of the Georgia Land Lotteries, a lottery system used by the U.S. state of Georgia between the years 1805 and 1833 to steal and redistribute Cherokee and Muscogee land. The lottery was authorized by the Georgia General Assembly by an act of May 11, 1803, with drawings occurring in 1805. The lottery redistributed land in Baldwin, Wayne, and Wilkinson counties. 490-acre plots were redistributed in Wayne County and 202.5-acre plots were redistributed in Baldwin and Wilkinson counties. The 1805 lottery were used to steal Muscogee land and redistribute it to white settlers.

The John Rountree Log House in Twin City, Georgia, was built by John Rountree on land he won in the lottery.

== See also ==
- Georgia Land Lotteries
  - 1807 Land Lottery
  - 1820 Land Lottery
  - 1821 Land Lottery
  - 1827 Land Lottery
  - 1832 Land Lottery
  - Gold Lottery of 1832
  - 1833 Fractions Lottery
- Georgia resolutions 1827
- Indian removal
