= Calhoun Mine =

- U.S. National Register of Historic Places
- U.S. National Historic Landmark
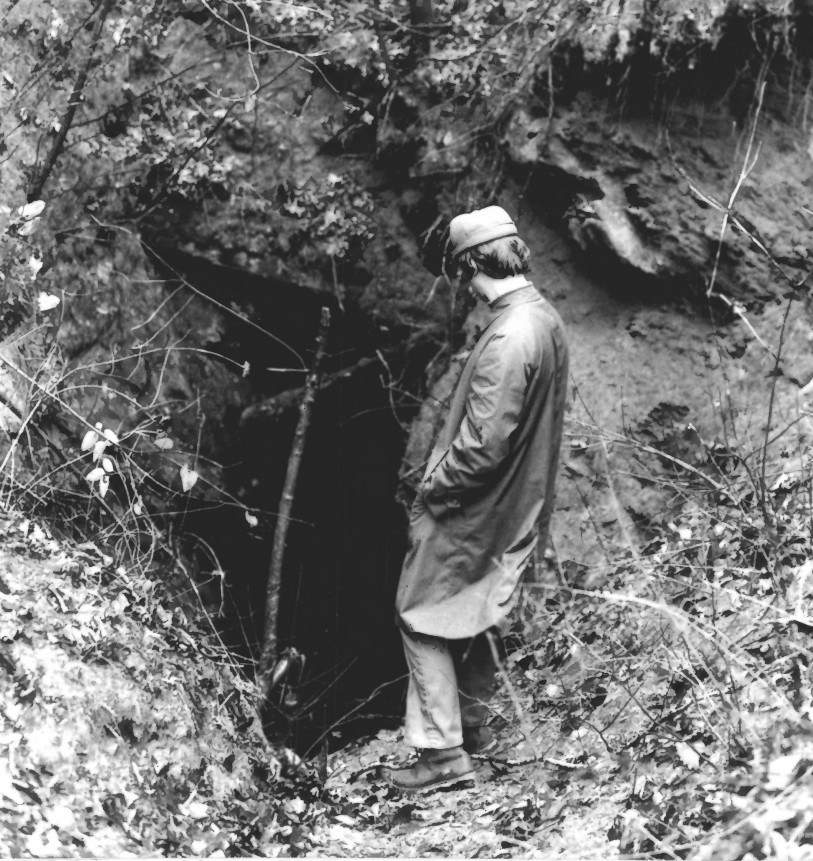
- National Park Service photo, 1972

- Location within Georgia Location within the United States
- Location: Lumpkin County, Georgia
- Nearest city: Dahlonega, Georgia
- Coordinates: 34°29′31.34″N 83°58′55.67″W
- Area: 110 acres (45 ha)
- Built: 1828
- NRHP reference No.: 73002292

Significant dates
- Added to NRHP: November 7, 1973
- Designated NHL: November 7, 1973

The Calhoun Mine is perhaps the oldest and best-known mine in Lumpkin County, Georgia. When gold was discovered in Lumpkin County in 1828, which led to the Georgia Gold Rush in 1829, it was discovered on 239 acres (0.97 km^{2}) owned by Robert Obar. After at least two intermediary sales, the land was purchased by Senator John C. Calhoun of South Carolina, who later served as the 7th Vice President of the United States. Calhoun started a mining company to mine the land and later allowed his son-in-law Thomas Green Clemson, the founder of Clemson University, to manage it. The ore deposit was a very rich deposit and, according to an 1856 letter from Clemson to his brother-in-law, was still producing significant quantities of gold nearly 30 years after its initial discovery on the land. This mine - along with the Consolidated Mine and the Loud Mine - were some of the most productive mines in the Georgia Gold Belt.

In 1879, the Calhoun Mine passed from the Calhoun family. In 1939, after the deposits at the Calhoun Mine were long thought to be depleted, a small pocket was discovered and mined. After the initial excitement, things became quiet once again at the mine. The Calhoun Mine was added to the National Register of Historic Places and named a National Historic Landmark in 1973.

Calhoun Mine is located about 3 miles (5 km) south of Dahlonega off State Route 60 and on the eastern side of the Chestatee River. It lies on a hill on the west side of the road - about 0.6 miles (1 km) off the road - on the opposite side of the ridge, on private property.

The mine was designated a National Historic Landmark and listed on the National Register of Historic Places in 1973, for its nationally significant role as an instigating element of the Cherokee removal. The mine was located directly adjacent to Cherokee land, and the conflict with miners illegally working Cherokee lands contributed to calls for removal, and the eventual displacement of, the Cherokee from their lands.

== See also ==
- List of National Historic Landmarks in Georgia (U.S. state)
- National Register of Historic Places listings in Lumpkin County, Georgia
