= Free Jim Mine =

- Location within Georgia
- Location: Dahlonega, Lumpkin County, Georgia, United States; 34.5347°N 83.9725°W

The Free Jim Mine was a Georgia Gold Rush gold mine located in the town of Dahlonega in Lumpkin County, Georgia, United States. The mine was started by a free African American named James Boisclair, who arrived in the area in the 1830s from Augusta, Georgia. Apparently, Boisclair discovered gold on a tract of land but, under state law, could not purchase the land since he was black, except through a guardian. A local resident, Joseph J. Singleton became his custodian, consequently allowing Boisclair to purchase the land and start what would become known as the Free Jim Mine. The mine was operated by Bosclair for some years. Boisclair left Georgia following news of the California Gold Rush.

A little mining continued after the departure of Boisclair, but interest quickly waned as miners were unable to find any ore vein.

Today, the Free Jim Mine lies underneath the present-day Pine Tree Mfg. plant and other nearby businesses within the city limits of Dahlonega.

== Sources ==
- "Thar's Gold in Them Thar Hills" - Players and Places (accessed December 4, 2006)
- Mines Of The Nation's First Gold Rush, by Sylvia Gailey Head (accessed December 4, 2006)
