= Georgia Gold Belt =

Area of gold deposits in the Southeast United States

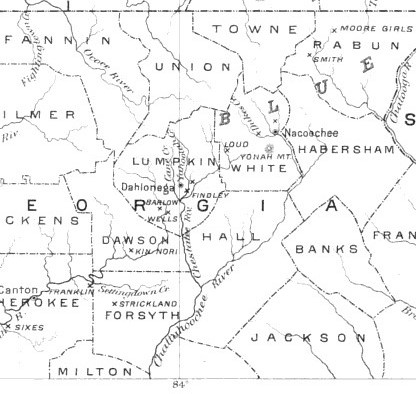
Georgia Gold Belt showing, southwest to northeast, the Sixes, Franklin, Strickland, Kin Mori, Barlow, Wells, Findley, Loud, Smith, and Moore Gold mines. Gold-quartz veins are found in the schists and gneiss.

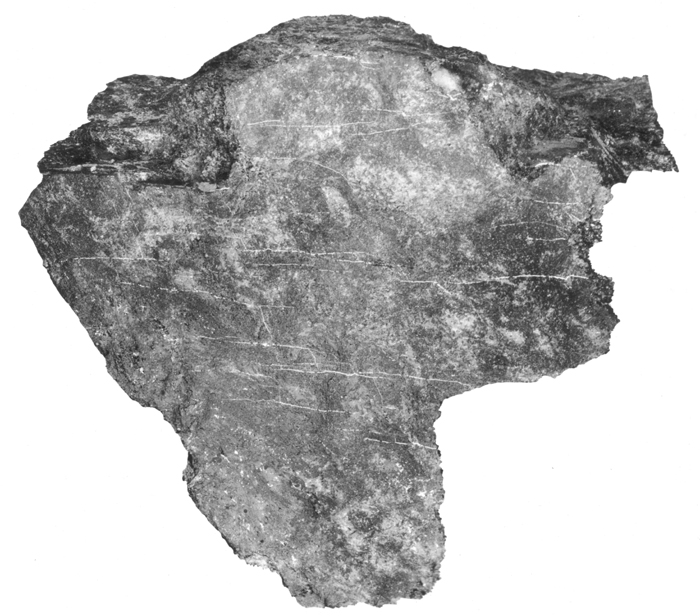
Gold veinlets (they appear white) in a sample of gneiss from the Battle Branch Mine in Lumpkin County

The largest quantities of gold found in the eastern United States were found in the Georgia Gold Belt, extending from eastern Alabama to Rabun County, Georgia. The biggest concentration of gold was found in White, Lumpkin, and northern Cherokee counties in Georgia. The gold in the Georgia Gold Belt was close to 24 karat (100%) purity. Most of the gold was found in eroded rock (saprolite) and mixed in with quartz.

Besides placer deposits of gold, and gold bearing quartz in weathered rock, gold also occurs in quartz veins. The most profitable veins, in the Dahlonega District, occur in the contact zone between mica-schists and granite or diorite.

The discovery of gold in the Georgia Gold Belt in 1828 led to the Georgia Gold Rush. The historic cities of Auraria and Dahlonega were the primary beneficiaries of the gold discovery, and a branch mint of the United States Mint was operated in Dahlonega until 1861. The Georgia Gold Belt is part of a zone of gold deposits in the southeast United States that runs from Alabama to Virginia. Smaller gold deposits can be found farther north.

== See also ==
- List of gold mines in Georgia
