= John Rountree Log House =

Historic house in Georgia, United States

- U.S. National Register of Historic Places
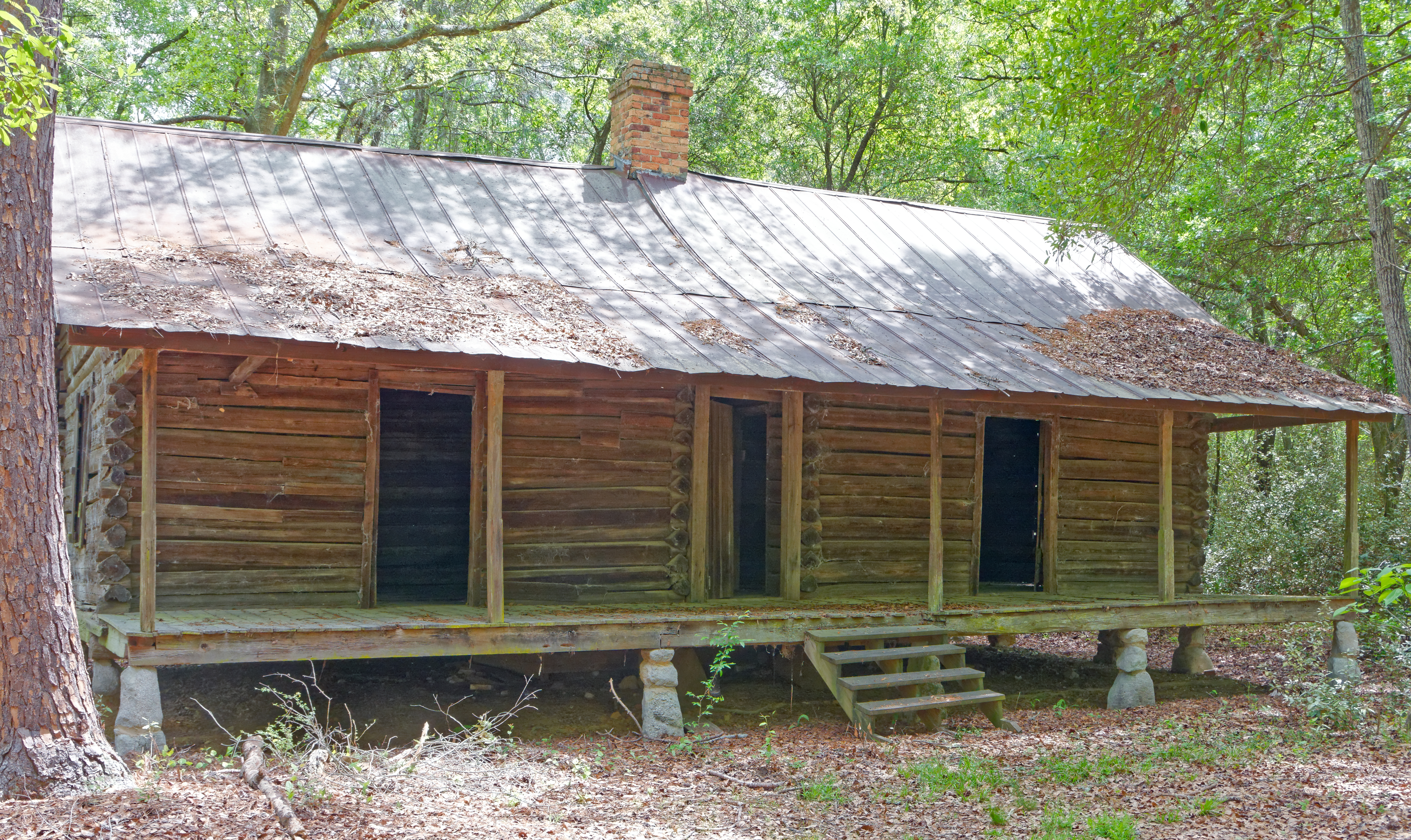
- The house in 2017

- Location within Georgia Location within the United States
- Location: Junction of U.S. Route 80 and GA 192, Twin City, Georgia
- Coordinates: 32.58399°N 82.16531°W
- Area: 10 acres (4.0 ha)
- Built: c.1830
- Architectural style: saddlebag log house
- NRHP reference No.: 97000841
- Added to NRHP: August 15, 1997

The John Rountree Log House is a saddlebag log house near Twin City in Emanuel County, Georgia, which was built in c.1830. It was listed on the National Register of Historic Places in 1997.

It was deemed to be an outstanding example of a saddlebag log construction. Diamond notching of the logs was employed in the construction, which was rare, relative to half-dovetail notching, in Georgia.

It was built in c.1830 or 1832 by John Rountree on land awarded to his family in the 1805 Georgia Land Lottery. A rear shed addition was built during 1845–1850, and this was expanded c.1925.

In 2017 it was named by the Georgia Trust for Historic Preservation as one of ten "Places in Peril". The press release stated that the house, owned by the City of Twin City, "suffers from lack of maintenance and awareness" and that "While the cabin is sound, rehabilitation is needed for it to be reopened to the public. The current city administration is dedicated to the rehabilitation and maintenance of this historic Georgia resource."
