= 1807 Land Lottery =

The 1807 Land Lottery was the second lottery of the Georgia Land Lotteries, a lottery system used by the U.S. state of Georgia between the years 1805 and 1833 to steal and redistribute Cherokee and Muscogee land. The 1807 lottery was authorized by the Georgia General Assembly by an act of June 26, 1806. The lottery redistributed land in Baldwin and Wilkinson counties. 202.5 acre lots were redistributed in both counties. The 1807 lottery were used to steal Muscogee land and redistribute it to white settlers. Registrations for the lottery took place between June 26 and September 26, 1806, with drawings occurring between August 10 and September 23, 1807. Fortunate drawers from the previous 1805 lottery were excluded.

== See also ==
- Georgia Land Lotteries
  - 1805 Land Lottery
  - 1820 Land Lottery
  - 1821 Land Lottery
  - 1827 Land Lottery
  - 1832 Land Lottery
  - Gold Lottery of 1832
  - 1833 Fractions Lottery
- Georgia resolutions 1827
- Indian removal
