= James Boisclair =

James Boisclair was an African American merchant and gold miner who achieved notable fame and success during the Georgia Gold Rush. Boisclair was known as "Free Jim" and was highly regarded at the time for his entrepreneurial work and part-time efforts as a preacher.

== Early life ==
James was born on the plantation of Daniel Grant in Wilkes County, Georgia around 1795. James was born into slavery, but Grant specified in his will that his slaves should be freed after reaching a certain age (31 for men, 28 for women). In 1814, James was sold to Michael Boisclair of Augusta, Georgia, where he remained until he was freed in 1826.

== Dahlonega and the gold rush ==
Boisclair arrived in Dahlonega, Georgia in 1833 during the Georgia Gold Rush, and opened a small shop, and started searching for gold. While panning for gold, Boisclair found an impressive vein of ore. As a black man in the Antebellum South, he was not able to legally buy the plot of land for a gold mine. Instead, he was able to get Joseph Singleton, the head of the Dahlonega Mint, to take legal ownership of the lot while Boisclair maintained de facto control. Boisclair began Gold panning at his mine, and used the gold dust he collected to build the largest general store in Dahlonega, Georgia. The mine came to be known as the Free Jim Mine. Other Boisclair achievements of the time included his building of an ice house and popular saloon, despite the fact that all of his establishments faced problems because the laws of the time prevented black men from buying real estate or holding a liquor license.

== Move to California and death ==
James Boisclair traveled to California in a search for fortune in the new gold rush, and in 1850 Boisclair took his entrepreneurial efforts to a new level by hiring fifty men to come help him mine for gold.

According to most accounts, Boisclair died at age 46 after being shot during an argument over a disputed gold claim. The Probate Court in Sacramento country records the death of a James Boisclair on November 20, 1861, who died from natural causes, according to a filing in the Probate Court in Sacramento that quotes C. B. Hawkins, Boisclair's care-giver.

In 1860, free blacks made up less than 1% of Georgia's black population, and the majority of them were poor. James Boisclair was a rare example of a black man in the Antebellum-era Georgia who was able to prosper economically in spite of harsh legal repression he had to work around.
