= Louder =

Louder refers to an increase in loudness.

Louder may also refer to:

== People ==
- Alexis Louder, American actress
- Alison Louder, Canadian actress
- Earle Louder, musician specialising in playing euphonium, professor of music
- Jeff Louder (born 1977), American road racing cyclist

== Music ==
- Louder (Lea Michele album)
  - "Louder" (Lea Michele song), single from Lea Michele album above
- Louder (R5 album)
  - Louder Tour, 2014 concert tour by R5 to promote their album above
- Louder!, an album by Sofía Reyes
- "Louder" (Charice song)
- "Louder" (DJ Fresh song)
- "Louder" (DJ MuscleBoy song)
- "Louder" (Neon Jungle song)
- "Louder" (Parade song)
- "Louder", a song by All That Remains from the album Madness, 2017
- Louder, or Louder Sound, is the parent brand of Metal Hammer, Prog and Classic Rock magazines since 2017

== See also ==
- Louder, Louder!, debut album by American rock band Killola
- Loud (disambiguation)
