= Shuksan, Washington =

Ghost town in Washington (state)

Shuksan, Washington Gold Hill
- Ghost town
- Interactive map of Shuksan, Washington
- Coordinates: 48°54′31″N 121°41′52″W
- Country: United States
- State: Washington
- County: Whatcom
- Established: 1897
- Elevation: 2,044 ft (623 m)
- Time zone: UTC-8 (Pacific (PST))
  - Summer (DST): UTC-7 (PDT)
- GNIS feature ID: 1529991

Shuksan (previously Gold Hill) is a ghost town in Whatcom County, located along Washington State Route 542 at its intersection with FR-3065 (Twin Lakes Road).

The town was built in response to the discovery of gold at nearby Lone Jack mine. Today a WSDOT highway maintenance station is the only thing in the area.

== History ==
After gold was discovered at the Lone Jack Mine in 1897, many tent cities popped up around the area, including one called Gold Hill, and after the best approach to the mine was determined to go through the town, its growth outpaced the others. It was later renamed to Shuksan, for the view of Mount Shuksan seen from the area.

The Shuksan post office was established on May 12, 1898, with John C. Treutle as its first postmaster. The post office ran until August 16, 1899, when post was routed through the nearby settlement of Keese.

Also in 1898, there were two stores, one of which run by Treutle, and about thirty new cabins in Shuksan. The town had 1500 people at its peak.

A new post office was established in the area on April 4, 1903, with John Broyles as the postmaster. Broyles was a judge, a veteran of the Civil War, and a homesteader in the area. This post office was named Hermann, after Binger Hermann, and lasted until November 11, 1907. In the post office's 1903 application, it listed the population as somewhere between 500 and 1000.

== See also ==
- Mount Baker Gold Rush
- List of ghost towns in Washington
