= Montgomery Creek (Georgia) =

- Location within Georgia Location within the United States

Physical characteristics
- Source
  - coordinates: 34.6473118°N 84.1365815°W
- Mouth
  - coordinates: 34.6167573°N 84.1074141°W

Montgomery Creek is a stream in the U.S. state of Georgia. It is a tributary to the Etowah River.

Montgomery Creek is named for the local Montgomery family of settlers.

It meets the West Fork Montgomery Creek southeast of Penitentiary Cove.
