= Land lottery =

A land lottery or land ballot is a method of allocating land ownership or the right to occupy land by lot.

Some examples are:

- Moses' allocation of Promised Land territory to the Israelite tribes by lot, as mandated in Numbers 26:55 and 33:54 and effected by his successor Joshua in Joshua 13:6.
- The Georgia Land Lotteries held between 1805 and 1833
- The allocation of land in the former Kiowa-Comanche and Apache reservation in Oklahoma Territory on August 6, 1901.
- The allocation of reclaimed land at Tule Lake, California, to returning veteran homesteaders after World War II. It is reported that prospective settlers' names were drawn from a pickle jar because the number of applicants was greater than the number of homesteads available.

== Israelite land lottery ==
Map of the twelve tribes of Israel (before the move of Dan to the north)

Numbers 26:52–56 combines allocation of land by lot with a distribution system allocating territory according to each tribe's adult male population size. The Pulpit Commentary suggests that the community "probably employed stones, differing in shape or colour, or having some distinguishing mark", which were "placed in a vessel or in the fold of a garment, and drawn or shaken thence", with the outcome being interpreted as a divine decision.

== Australia ==
The Australian state of Queensland employed land ballots as a way to encourage settlement of marginal agricultural land during the 20th century. The "ballot box system" was introduced by T. J. Ryan's state government in 1916, with ballots advertised by sales maps which provided details about the land to be released and where the ballot would be held. Each applicant would receive a corresponding numbered marble, with a marble being drawn for each block made available. The scheme continued until the late 1960s. In most cases, only "landless men with limited financial resources were eligible to apply" for the ballot and the winning applicants would acquire an initial leasehold of five to seven years, contingent on their maintaining residence on the land and meeting development criteria.

In Western Australia, the ballot system was used to allocate Crown land in the North-West in the 21st century, with LandCorp conducting random draws from a barrel.
