= 1827 Land Lottery =

The 1827 Land Lottery was the fifth lottery of the Georgia Land Lotteries, a lottery system used by the U.S. state of Georgia between the years 1805 and 1833 to redistribute conquered Cherokee and Muscogee land to American settlers. The 1827 lottery was authorized by the Georgia General Assembly by an act of June 9, 1825. The lottery redistributed confiscated Muscogee land in Carroll, Coweta, Lee, Muscogee, and Troup counties.

The lots were 202.5 acres in size. Registration for the lottery occurred in the two months after the Act's publication on December 7, 1824, with drawings occurring in 1827. Fortunate drawers from the previous Georgia land lotteries were excluded, as well as draft resisters who refused to fight in the War of 1812 or the Indian Wars, people who deserted from military service, imprisoned convicts, tax defaulters, and absconders for debt.

== See also ==
- Georgia Land Lotteries
  - 1805 Land Lottery
  - 1807 Land Lottery
  - 1820 Land Lottery
  - 1821 Land Lottery
  - 1832 Land Lottery
  - Gold Lottery of 1832
  - 1833 Fractions Lottery
- Georgia resolutions 1827
- Indian removal
