= Lone Jack mine =

Mine in Whatcom County, Washington

Lone Jack
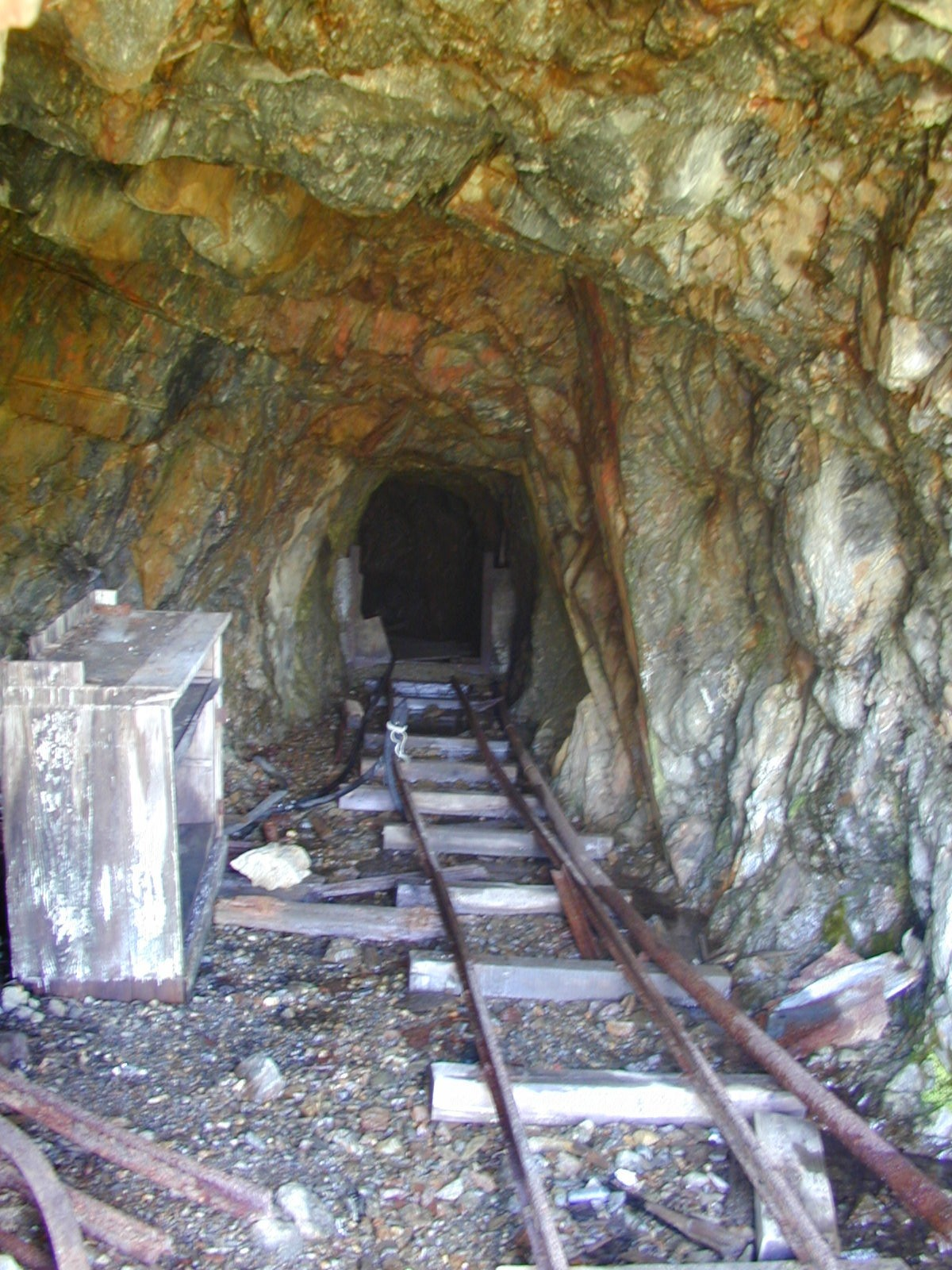
- Interior of the Lulu portal (c. 2005)
- Interactive map of Lone Jack
- Location: Mount Baker Wilderness, Washington, United States; 48°56′39″N 121°37′15″W
- Products: Gold, Silver
- Discovered: 1897
- Active: 1900–1907; 1915–1917; 1923–1924; 1992–1996

The Lone Jack mine (also known as Post-Lambert) is an inactive gold mine in the Mount Baker mining district of the U.S. state of Washington. The lode was discovered in August 1897, and is cited as sparking the Mount Baker gold rush. It lies on the east slope of Bear Mountain (a child peak of Goat Mountain) at an altitude of about 5,000 feet (1,500 m), about 1 mile (1,600 m) southeast of the Twin Lakes.

The Lone Jack mine consists of five patented claims: Lone Jack, Whist, Lulu, Jennie, and Sidney. The mine has three adits (or portals), known as Lone Jack, Lulu, and Whist, after the veins they tap respectively. The US Mint reports 9,463 troy ounces (294.3 kg) of gold and 1,961 troy ounces (61.0 kg) of silver was recovered from the Lone Jack mine from 1897 through 1969.

== History ==
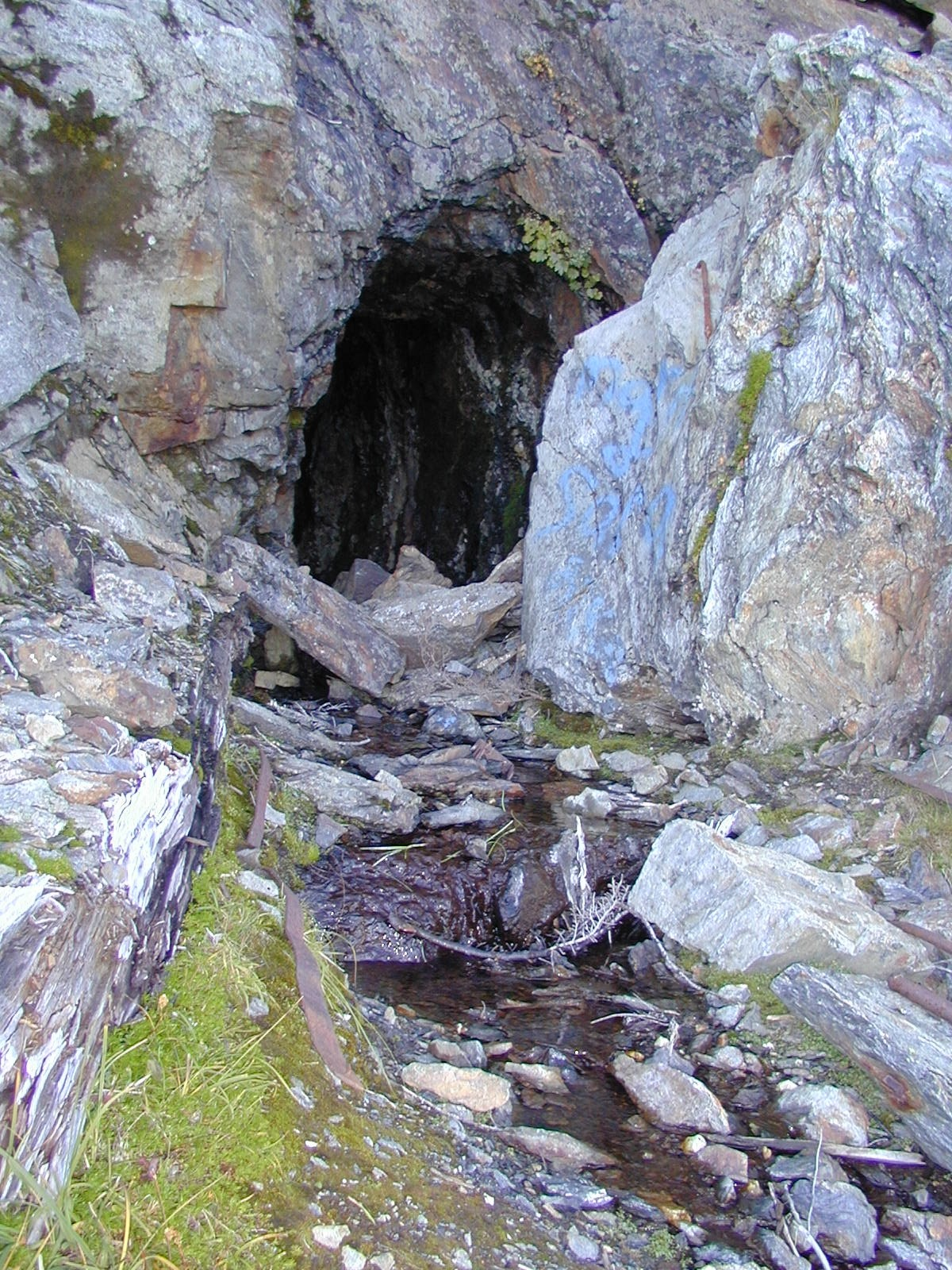
Exterior view of the Lone Jack adit (c. 2005)

The Lone Jack lode was discovered in August 1897 by Jack Post, Russ S. Lambert, and Lyman G. Van Valkenburg. Jack had previously been involved in the Fraser River gold rush in the 1860s, and after moving to Sumas, Washington, he spent years searching for gold around Mount Baker. Lambert and Van Valkenburg were both prominent Sumas residents. The next year the claims were sold to the newly formed Mount Baker Mining Company of Portland, Oregon for $50,000 ($1.94 million in 2025). In 1900 a 10-stamp mill was installed near Silesia Creek; the next year, a 50-ton aerial tram was installed to connect the mine to the mill and 5 additional stamps were added. Most of the gold mined from Lone Jack was mined by the Mount Baker Mining Company.

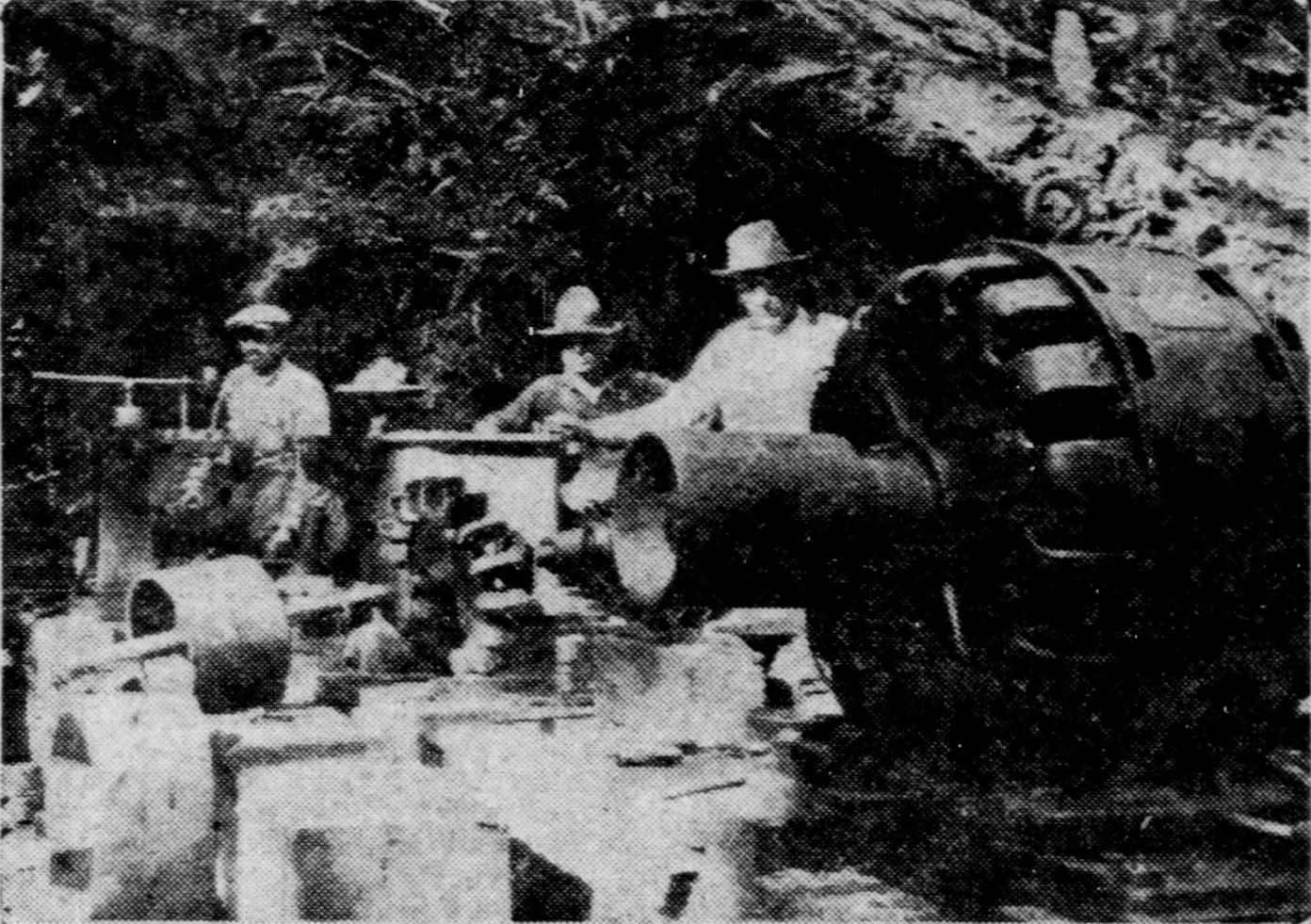
The hydroelectric plant at Silesia Creek circa 1922

In July 1907, a fire destroyed the mill and the tramway collapsed, causing operations at the mines to stop. In 1915 the mine was leased to Boundary Gold Company, who built another mill and developed the Lulu vein, but ceased production in 1917. The Brooks-Willis Metals Company leased the mine in 1917 and purchased it in 1920. They built a 100-ton mill in 1923, along with a bunkhouse, sawmill, flume, and hydroelectric plant, but the mill was destroyed in a snowslide the next year, ceasing operations.

From 1925 to 1941, general improvements were made to the mine, including building a road from Skagway Pass. In 1941, Robert J. Cole leased the mine and performed annual assessment work (Note: Annual assessment work is labor or improvements made to a claim and reported to the Bureau of Land Management, which can include road construction, surveying, sampling, etc.) on the surrounding claims until about 1970. No gold was mined during this period.

On August 27, 1964, about five hundred (Note: Previous estimates circa 1950 indicated around 300 cases, but the Army crew counted closer to 500.) cases of dynamite stored in the Lulu portal were detonated by the 170th Ordnance Explosives Disposal Detachment from Fort Lewis, along with another 500 pounds (230 kg) added. The detonation was done in secret, as the previous year it had to be cancelled when the news leaked and tourists showed up to watch. The cases of dynamite had been left there for decades in some cases, only reported to the Forest Service in about 1960. Nitroglycerin had seeped out of the sticks, through the boxes, and into the flooring of the powder house, which was located about 250 feet (76 m) deep in the mine. After the pile was lit, the explosion was larger than expected. A plume of fire shot out from an air vent, roughly 20 feet (6 m) across and 200 feet (60 m) long, covering the surrounding snow in soot and gravel. Damage was mainly done to the air lines and mine tracks, with little done to the shaft itself.

From 1992 to 1996, Diversified Development Company developed the Whist vein, noted as being the first gold mining operation in the county since 1978, and the first operation at Lone Jack since 1924. The mine has not been in operation since 1997, with the only activity being road and safety maintenance.

== Geology ==
There are at least three quartz veins at Lone Jack, in pre-Jurassic metamorphic rock, mostly schist of the Shuksan Metamorphic Suite. The gold in the quartz veins is most often too small to see with the naked eye, although can be as big as a pinhead. The quartz in these veins is of two different ages, with only the younger quartz bearing gold. Based on all operations at Lone Jack, the quartz is estimated to contain between 0.63 and 0.94 troy ounces (20 and 29 g) of gold per ton.

The minerals in the veins are predominantly quartz, with smaller amounts of pyrrhotite, pyrite, chalcopyrite, tellurbismuth, and gold. Quartz makes up over 98% of the veins.

The three veins vary in thickness throughout. The Lone Jack vein ranges in thickness from 1 to 6 feet (30 to 180 cm), and averages 2.5 feet (80 cm). The Lulu vein ranges from only a few inches (an inch is 2.5 cm) to 9 feet (270 cm). The Whist vein is the smallest of the three, and only averages 2 feet (60 cm).

== See also ==
- Boundary Red Mountain Mine, a nearby mine discovered a year after Lone Jack
- Shuksan, Washington, a nearby ghost town originally built by miners and prospectors
- Swamp Creek, a nearby creek important in the Mount Baker gold rush
