= 1820 Land Lottery =

The 1820 Land Lottery was the third lottery of the Georgia Land Lotteries, a lottery system used by the U.S. state of Georgia between the years 1805 and 1833 to steal and redistribute Cherokee and Muscogee land. The 1820 lottery was authorized by the Georgia General Assembly by acts of December 15, 1818, and December 16, 1819. The lottery redistributed land in Baldwin and Wilkinson counties. The 1820 lottery were used to steal Muscogee land and redistribute it to white settlers. Following the Creek War (1813–1814), President Andrew Jackson demanded from the Muscogee an immense area of land which would become the southern third of the entire state of Georgia. A second section of land in northeast Georgia was included. This other, smaller section defined the eastern end of the Cherokee Nation for 12 years. Muscogee land was stolen and redistributed in Appling, Early, Gwinnett, Habersham, Hall, Irwin, Rabun, and Walton counties.

The size of stolen lots were either 250 acres or 490 acres. Drawings for the lottery occurred between September 1 and December 2, 1820. Fortunate drawers from the previous 1805 and 1807 lotteries were excluded (with an exception for families of orphans consisting of more than one person), as well as draft resisters who refused to fight in the War of 1812 or the Indian Wars, and any resident of "the lottery territory previous to the extinguishment of the Indian title".

== Fortunate drawers ==
Thomas Stamps Sr. of the Stamps family was a fortunate drawer, receiving 250 acres (1 km²) in present-day Gwinnett County.

== See also ==
- Georgia Land Lotteries
  - 1805 Land Lottery
  - 1807 Land Lottery
  - 1821 Land Lottery
  - 1827 Land Lottery
  - 1832 Land Lottery
  - Gold Lottery of 1832
  - 1833 Fractions Lottery
- Georgia resolutions 1827
- Indian removal
