= Georgia resolutions 1827 =

The Georgia Resolutions of 1827 were a response to the Cherokee's refusal to cede their territory within the U.S. state of Georgia. The resolutions declared the state's right to title, jurisdiction, and authority over all the land within its borders. They also stipulated that Indigenous people were tenants of Georgia at the state's will, and Georgia reserved the right to coerce obedience from all of its tenants, white, red or black. The resolutions were intended to pressure the federal government to prioritize its responsibility to Georgia over its responsibility to the Cherokee Nation, although it did not achieve its desired effect until the Jackson administration came into power.

== See also ==
- Cherokee removal
- Georgia Land Lotteries
  - 1805 Land Lottery
  - 1807 Land Lottery
  - 1820 Land Lottery
  - 1821 Land Lottery
  - 1827 Land Lottery
  - 1832 Land Lottery
  - Gold Lottery of 1832
  - 1833 Fractions Lottery
- Trail of Tears
