= Battle Branch Mine =

- Location within Georgia

Location
- Location: Auraria, Lumpkin County, Georgia, United States; 34°28′28″N 84°02′31″W

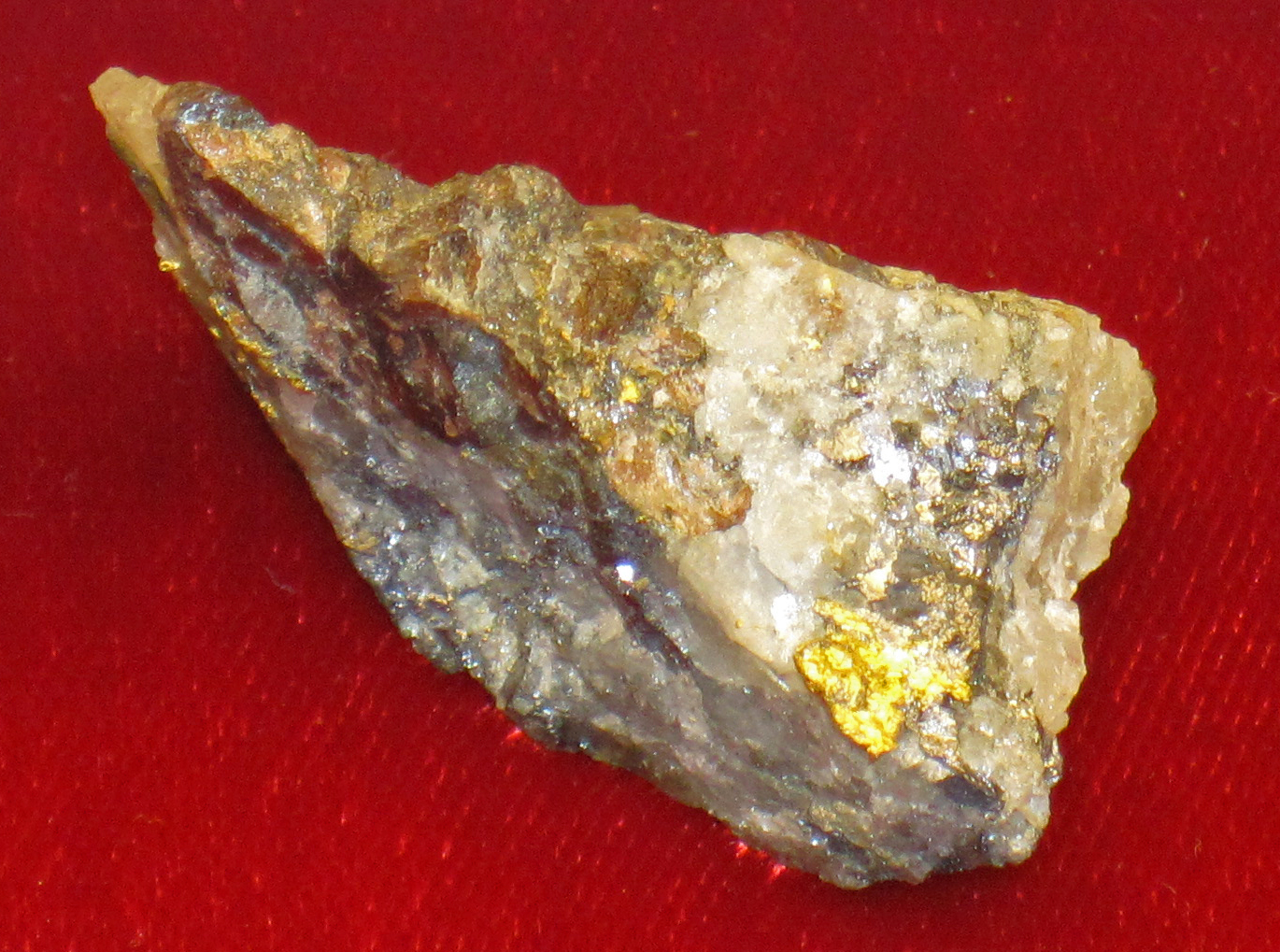
Gold-quartz-galena-garnet specimen, Battle Branch Mine

The Battle Branch Mine, sometimes referred to as the Battle Creek Mine, was located near the town of Auraria in Lumpkin County, Georgia. Specifically it is located on land lots 457 & 524 of the 12th district. Gold was first discovered there in 1831. Although placer mining was the first method of mining, the mine expanded during its long history to incorporate deep- tunnel 'vein' mining . Miners from several Southern states worked the mine in its early years. During the Georgia Gold Rush, before the Gold Lottery of 1832, men from Georgia and Tennessee were working in the same stream when a dispute over the possession of the property ended in a fight in which a number of men were seriously wounded, providing the name for the mine ultimately located there. Soon afterwards, in 1843, Major John Hockenhull and John Pasco struck a beautiful pocket of gold weighing some 2,200 pennyweights (120 ounces). After the American Civil War, William John Turner Hutcheson, who served with the Blue Ridge Rifles, a Confederate fighting unit from Dahlonega, Georgia, became superintendent of the Battle Branch gold mine. Later, from 1878 through 1882 the mine changed ownership and operated as the "Dahlonega Mine". Under the supervision of J.P. Imboden many more thousands of ounces were taken from the property. Afterwards. various individuals and companies took over the mine operations and continued producing gold well into the 1900s, producing 661.28 ounces (20.568 kg) of gold in 1935.

There is some confusion as to the actual location of the mine. The United States Geological Survey lists two mines named Battle Branch Mine. Both are to the west of Auraria, but one is on the west side of the Etowah River and the other is on the east side of the Etowah River.

== Suggested reading ==
- Parks, C. F., and R. A. Wilson. The Battle Branch Gold Mine, Auraria, Georgia. Atlanta, 1934.
