= Mount Baker gold rush =

In Whatcom County, Washington, US

The Mount Baker gold rush (1897 to mid 1920s) occurred in Whatcom County, Washington, United States, upon the discovery of the Lone Jack Mine. The Mount Baker area was flooded with prospectors, which led to the staking of many claims, both patented and not. The most notable mines staked soon after the Lone Jack are the Boundary Red Mountain Mine, Garget Mine (a.k.a. Gold Run Mine), Gold Basin Mine, Silver Tip Mine, and the Evergreen Mine.
