= Penitentiary Cove =

Valley in Lumpkin County, Georgia, USA

Coordinates: 34°37′44.47″N 84°8′16.55″W

Penitentiary Cove is a valley in northwest Lumpkin County in the U.S. state of Georgia, in the Chatahoochee–Oconee National Forest.

Penitentiary Cove was so named because of its rugged terrain, which figuratively confines a visitor like a penitentiary.

West Fork Montgomery Creek runs through the valley.
