= Franklin-Creighton Mine =

Coordinates: 34.31183°N 84.26661°W

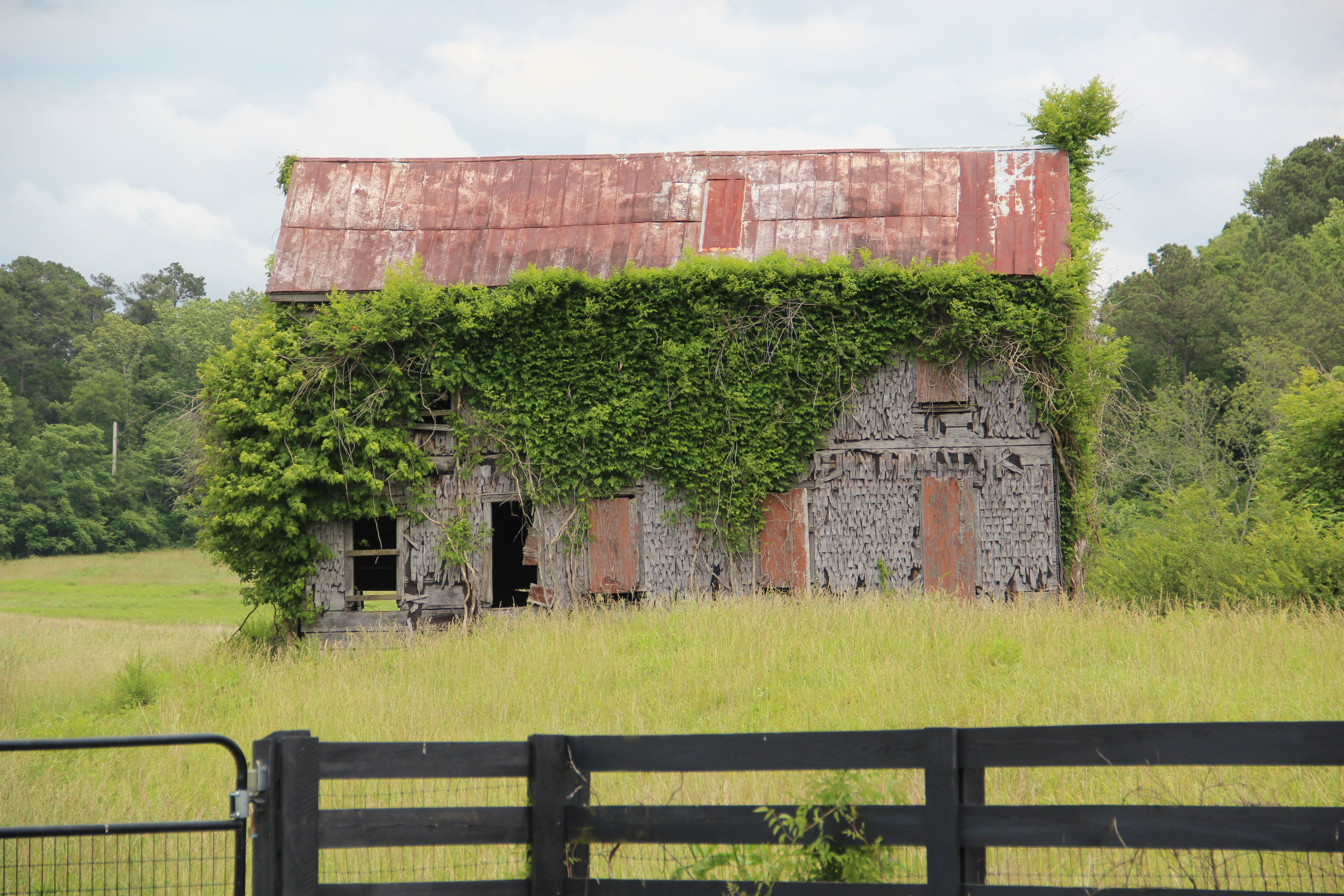
The Shingle House, the last remaining building from the Franklin-Creighton Mine.

The Franklin-Creighton Mine was a Georgia Gold Rush gold mine located off what is now Yellow Creek Road in the town of Ball Ground in Cherokee County, Georgia. The mine, located along the Etowah River, was initially known as the Franklin Mine because it was started by a widow, Mrs. Mary G. Franklin, who obtained a 40-acre (160,000 m^{2}) lot in the Gold Lottery of 1832. Around 1883, the mine became known as the Creighton Mine or the Franklin-Creighton Mine.

This mine was one of the most productive and continued to operate many years after other area mines had ceased operations. Some estimate that it was yielding $1000 per day in 1893 and others place its total production after 1880 at as much as $1,000,000. The mine was shut down in 1913 as a result of a collapsed shaft which caused the mine to flood. As of 2022, only three major structures exist: The stamping mill's concrete foundation (which has been rebuilt into a pavilion for the nearby housing development site), the Franklin residence and doctor's office, and the "Shingle House," the mine's former post office and general store.

== Sources ==
- A Brief History of Cherokee County (accessed December 4, 2006)
- Georgia Historical Marker – Cherokee County Gold (accessed December 4, 2006)
