= Red Hill mine =

Gold deposit near Cortez, Nevada

- Location within Nevada
- Location: Cortez, Nevada, United States; 40°8′27″N 116°31′55″W
- Discovered: 2011
- Company: Barrick Gold (61.5%); Newmont (38.5%)

The Red Hill mining project is a gold deposit in Eureka County, in central Nevada, adjacent to the Goldrush and Four Mile deposits. Owned by Barrick Gold (61.5%) and Newmont (38.5%), the deposits are being developed as an underground mining project accessed by decline. Barrick is the project operator.
