= Loud Township, Michigan =

- Civil township
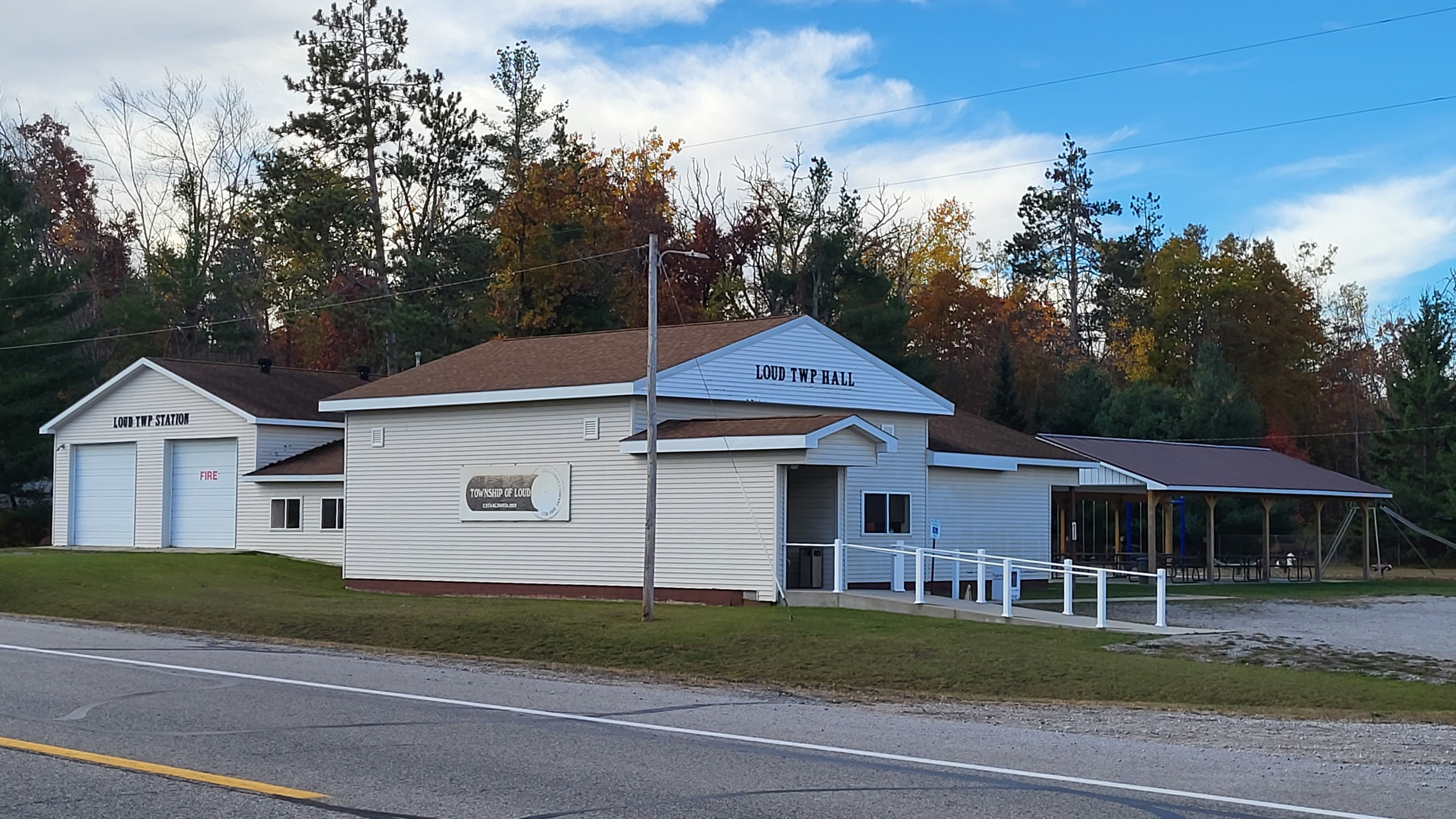
- Loud Township Hall

- Location within Montmorency County

- Location within the state of Michigan Location within the United States
- Coordinates: 44°53′46″N 84°04′08″W
- Country: United States
- State: Michigan
- County: Montmorency
- Established: 1912

Government
  - Supervisor: Beau Williams
  - Clerk: Robin Chinavare

Area
  - Total: 35.86 sq mi (92.88 km^{2})
  - Land: 35.77 sq mi (92.64 km^{2})
  - Water: 0.089 sq mi (0.23 km^{2})
- Elevation: 896 ft (273 m)

Population (2020)
  - Total: 262
  - Density: 7.32/sq mi (2.83/km^{2})
- Time zone: UTC-5 (Eastern (EST))
  - Summer (DST): UTC-4 (EDT)
- ZIP code(s): 49709 (Atlanta); 49756 (Lewiston); 48619 (Comins)
- Area code: 989
- FIPS code: 26-49480
- GNIS feature ID: 1626642
- Website: Official website

Loud Township is a civil township of Montmorency County in the U.S. state of Michigan. The population was 262 at the 2020 census.

== Geography ==
The township is in southern Montmorency County, bordered to the south by Oscoda County. State highway M-33 crosses the east side of the township, leading north and then west to Atlanta, the county seat, and south to Mio.

According to the U.S. Census Bureau, the township has a total area of 35.9 square miles (93 km^{2}), of which 35.8 square miles (93 km^{2}) are land and 0.1 square miles (0.3 km^{2}), or 0.25%, are water. The township is drained by Gilchrist Creek and Hunt Creek, north-flowing tributaries of the Thunder Bay River leading to Lake Huron.

== Demographics ==
As of the census of 2000, there were 284 people, 128 households, and 88 families residing in the township. The population density was 7.9 inhabitants per square mile (3.1/km^{2}). There were 415 housing units at an average density of 11.6 per square mile (4.5/km^{2}). The racial makeup of the township was 99.65% White, and 0.35% from two or more races.

There were 128 households, out of which 16.4% had children under the age of 18 living with them, 61.7% were married couples living together, 5.5% had a female householder with no husband present, and 31.3% were non-families. 24.2% of all households were made up of individuals, and 14.1% had someone living alone who was 65 years of age or older. The average household size was 2.22 and the average family size was 2.64.

In the township the population was spread out, with 16.2% under the age of 18, 6.0% from 18 to 24, 17.6% from 25 to 44, 33.5% from 45 to 64, and 26.8% who were 65 years of age or older. The median age was 50 years. For every 100 females, there were 105.8 males. For every 100 females age 18 and over, there were 101.7 males.

The median income for a household in the township was $26,750, and the median income for a family was $35,500. Males had a median income of $28,125 versus $21,667 for females. The per capita income for the township was $16,031. About 6.8% of families and 10.7% of the population were below the poverty line, including 18.8% of those under the age of eighteen and 11.2% of those 65 or over.
