= Montgomery Creek (Boone County, Iowa) =

Stream in Iowa, U.S.

Coordinates: 42°07′27″N 93°44′32″W

Montgomery Creek is a stream in the U.S. state of Iowa.

Montgomery Creek was named after J. B. Montgomery, a local minister who almost drowned while crossing the swollen creek.
