= Boundary Red Mountain Mine =

Gold mine

Coordinates: 48.9953°N 121.6303°W

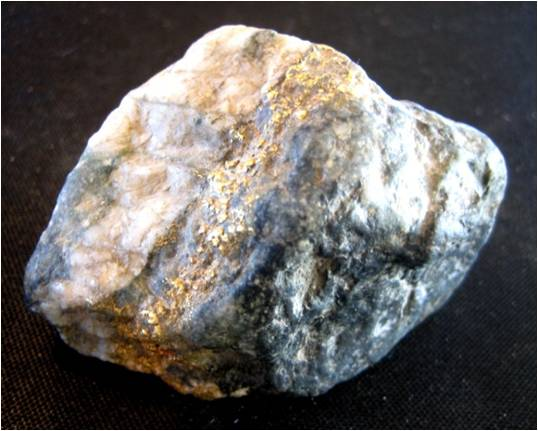
A sample of gold from The Boundary Red Mountain Mine

The Boundary Red Mountain Mine of Whatcom County, Washington, United States, consists of six patented lode claims survey in 1902 and patented under patent number 39545. The gold mine was discovered in 1898 and its last production year was 1946. The property is privately owned. The lode claims include Rocky draw lode, Klondike lode, Mountain Boy Lode, Glacier Lode, Climax lode, & Climax Ext No. 1 lode. Located in Whatcom County, Washington, U.S.A., the mine is approximately 0.5 mi (800 m) south of the Canada–US border. It is within close proximity to another gold mine, the Lone Jack mine, which stopped operations in 1924 and later reopened in 1991.

== Geology ==
The gold veins of the Boundary Red Mountain Mine are mainly fissure quartz veins.
