= Loud Mine =

Gold mine in Georgia, United States

- Location within Georgia
- Location: White County, Georgia, United States; 34.587°N 83.834°W

Loud Mine was a gold mine in White County, Georgia north of Dahlonega. The mine was situated four miles southwest of Cleveland, Georgia. Loud Mine was a mining site in the 19th century Georgia Gold Rush. The mine continued to produce gold into 1940. The site is now owned by a private gold mining group, and permission is needed to go on the property.
