= Consolidated Mine =

Gold mine in Georgia, United States

- Dahlonega Consolidated Gold Mine
- U.S. National Register of Historic Places
- U.S. Historic district
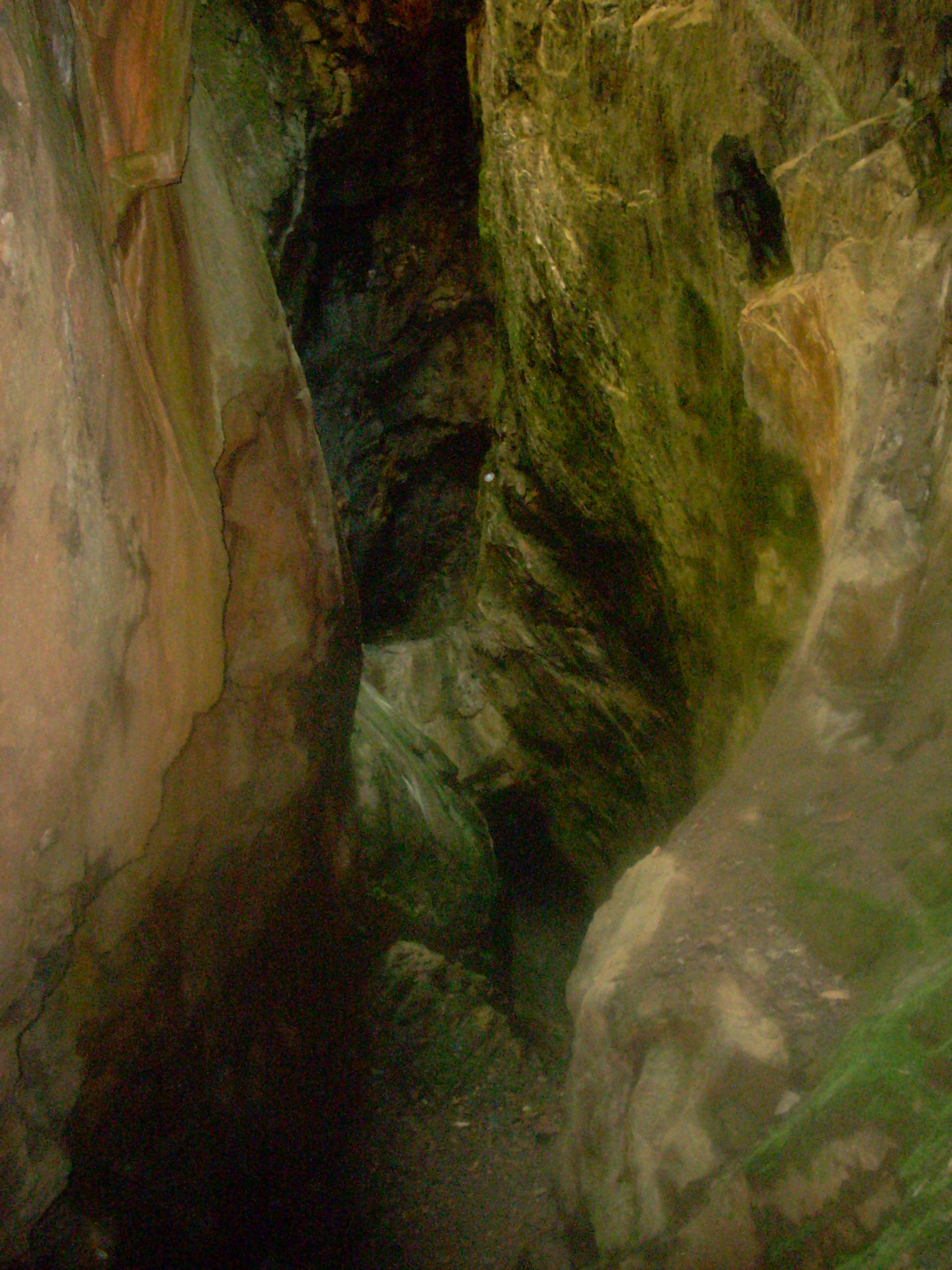
- Glory Hole at the Consolidated Gold Mine

- Location within Georgia Location within the United States
- Location: Lumpkin County, Georgia
- Nearest city: Dahlonega, Georgia
- Coordinates: 34°32′18″N 83°58′12″W
- Area: 92.5 acres (37.4 ha)
- Built: 1875
- Architect: Dahlonega Consolidated Gold Mining Co.
- NRHP reference No.: 80001111
- Added to NRHP: February 27, 1980

Consolidated Mine
- Interactive map of Consolidated Mine
- Location: Georgia (U.S. state), USA
- Products: Gold
- Closed: 1906
- Website: http://www.consolidatedgoldmine.com

The Consolidated Mine was a gold mine in Lumpkin County, Georgia, United States, just east of Dahlonega. Like most of the area around Dahlonega, the placer mining on the land on which the mine is located probably started during the Georgia Gold Rush. By 1880, the placer deposits were exhausted and the land was down to hard rock. Gold was soon discovered in a huge quartz vein system, and mined. "The richest acre" was mined deep into the ground, and the resulting shaft became known as the "Glory Hole.”

After an interruption of operations at the mine, a group of investors purchased about 7,000 acres (28 km^{2}) of land around the discovery site and formed the Dahlonega Consolidated Gold Mining Co. in 1895. After constructing the largest stamp mill east of the Mississippi River at the Consolidated Mine property, the Mining Co. folded in 1906. The mine's lower workings became flooded and lay dormant until seventy-five years later, when the site came under new ownership.

There is still gold to be mined here – but the cost of extracting the gold from the mine exceeds the value of the gold, at least for the time being. Today, a part of the upper level of the mine remains open for tourists, who can tour portions of the "Glory Hole" underground and pan for gold. Original cart rails, electrical lines and even an operational pneumatic drill recovered from the mine may be viewed. This mine and Crisson Mine are the two mines in the Dahlonega area that remain open for tourists. The Consolidated Mine remains the only mine in the area safe enough to take tourists into.
