= Gold Lottery of 1832 =

State of Georgia lottery, 1805–1833

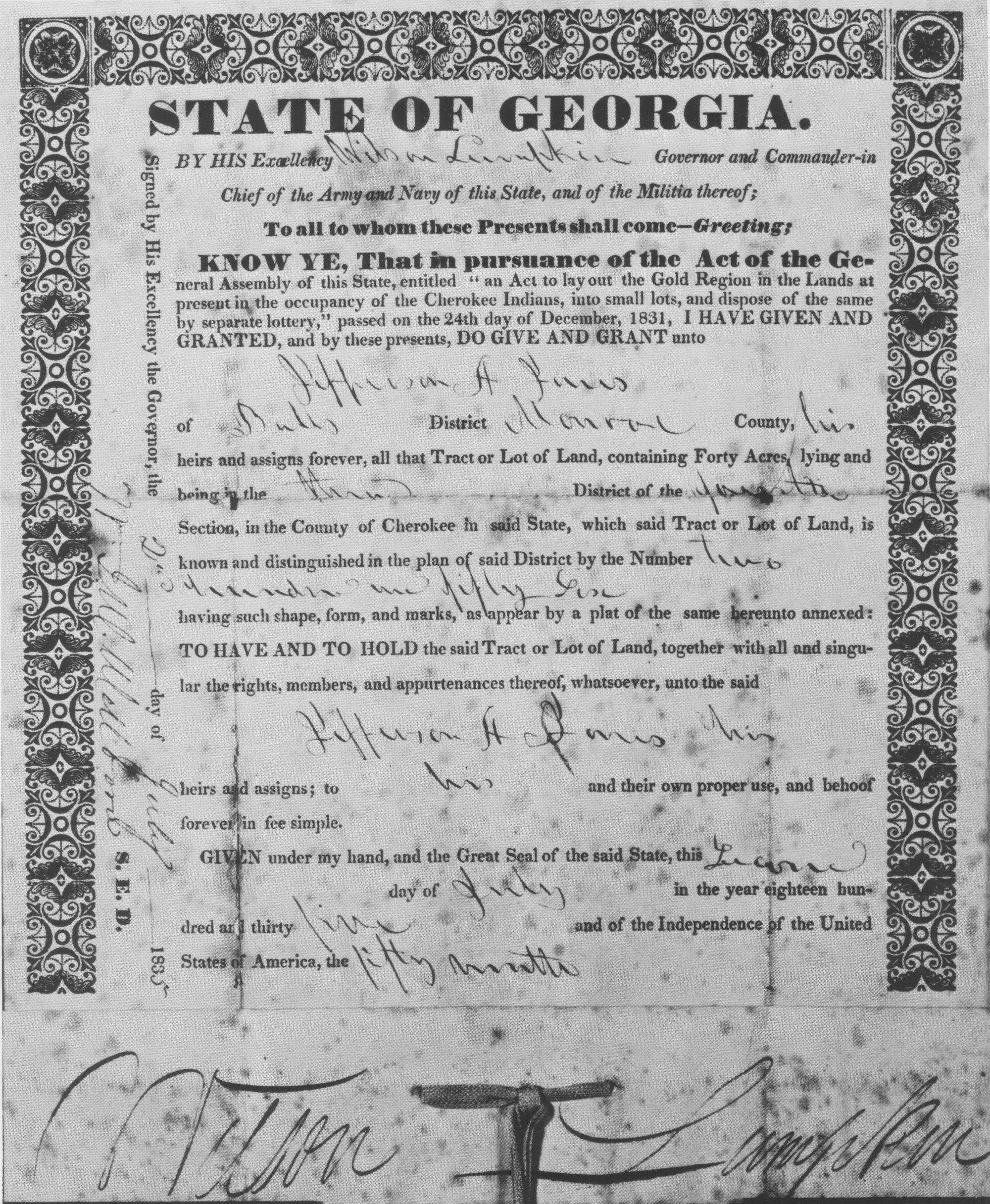
A deed issued as a result of the Gold Lottery of 1832

The Gold Lottery of 1832 was the seventh lottery of the Georgia Land Lotteries, a lottery system used by the State of Georgia between the years 1805 and 1833 to redistribute annexed Cherokee land. It was authorized by the Georgia General Assembly by an act of December 24, 1831 a few years after the start of the Georgia Gold Rush. The act specified that approximately one third of the 160-acre (0.65 km^{2}) land districts to be distributed by lottery under the act of December 21, 1830 (the sixth land lottery), be designated as gold districts of 40 acres (160,000 m^{2}) each and to be distributed in a separate lottery. The drawings for the Gold Lottery of 1832 occurred between October 22, 1832 and May 1, 1833 and applied to land that had been owned by the Cherokee Nation.

Those successful in the lottery had to pay a grant fee of $10.00 per lot. Those eligible were: bachelors over the age of 18 who were 3 year residents of Georgia and citizens of United States; widows who were 3 year residents of Georgia; families of orphans who were 3 year residents of Georgia and citizens of United States; and married men or male heads of family who were 3 year residents of Georgia (residency requirement waived for officers in the army or navy of the United States) and citizens of United States. Those excluded were: anyone who was successful in any previous land lottery who had taken a grant of a land lot; anyone who had mined, or caused to be mined, gold, silver, or other metal in the Cherokee territory since June 1, 1830; any person who had taken up residence in the Cherokee territory, anyone who had been convicted of a felony in any court in Georgia; and anyone who was a member of "a horde of Thieves known as the Pony Club."

The 1833 Land Lottery was held in December, 1833 to, among other things, distribute lots and fractions from the Gold Lottery of 1832 that were not placed in the prize wheels during the Gold Lottery of 1832.

== See also ==
- Cherokee removal
- Georgia Land Lotteries
  - 1805 Land Lottery
  - 1807 Land Lottery
  - 1820 Land Lottery
  - 1821 Land Lottery
  - 1827 Land Lottery
  - 1832 Land Lottery
  - 1833 Fractions Lottery
- Georgia resolutions 1827

== Sources ==
- Website of the Georgia Archives, Office of the Georgia Secretary of State (accessed October 30, 2006) Site updated (January 31, 2012)
