= Georgia Gold Rush =

Discovery of gold in Georgia, US

- Date: 1828 - early 1840s
- Location: Georgia, United States
- Also known as: Great Intrusion
- Participants: prospectors
- Outcome: Gold became difficult to find by the early 1840s causing the Georgia Gold Rush to come to an end and experienced miners would later go west to seek their fortune in the 1848 California Gold Rush

The Georgia Gold Rush was the second significant gold rush in the United States and the first in Georgia, and overshadowed the previous rush in North Carolina. It started in 1829 in present-day Lumpkin County near the county seat, Dahlonega, and soon spread through the North Georgia mountains, following the Georgia Gold Belt. By the early 1840s, gold became difficult to find. Many Georgia miners moved west when gold was found in the Sierra Nevada in 1848, starting the California gold rush. Since the 16th century, American Indians in Georgia told European explorers that the small amounts of gold which they possessed came from mountains of the interior. Some poorly documented accounts exist of Spanish or French mining gold in North Georgia between 1560 and 1690, but they are based on supposition and on rumors passed on by Indians. In summing up known sources, W.S. Yeates observed: "Many of these accounts and traditions seem to be quite plausible. Nevertheless, it is hardly probable that the Spaniards would have abandoned mines which were afterwards found to be quite profitable, as those in North Georgia."

== North Carolina gold rush ==
Hernando de Soto led an expedition in 1540, and "came across a young native who showed the Spaniards how gold was mined, melted, and refined by his people." Ozley Bird Saunook, a former Cherokee chief, claimed "his people knew of gold in the area as early as the sixteenth century when de Soto passed through the region."

In 1799, gold was discovered in Cabarrus County, North Carolina, when Conrad Reed found a 17-pound "glittering stone" in Little Meadow Creek, on his father's farm. Conrad had the stone identified in Fayetteville, North Carolina, three years later. By 1804, this Carolina Gold Rush resulted in placer mining, the discovery of a gold-rich quartz vein by Mathias Barringer along Long Creek in Stanly County, North Carolina. The gold belt was extended north into Virginia, and south into South Carolina, Georgia, and Alabama.

== 1828 Georgia discovery ==
No one knows which version of the original find is accurate:

- Some anecdotes have either Frank Logan or his slave making the find in White County, Georgia, in Dukes Creek.
- Another version of the White County find has John Witherood (or Witherow/Withrow) finding a three-ounce nugget along Dukes Creek.
- Still another version was that the North Carolina prospector Jesse Hogan found gold near Dahlonega, Georgia, at Ward's Creek.
- There are some accounts that attest an Indigenous man found the first gold nugget at Chestatee River in 1815.
- Thomas Bowen supposedly found gold in the roots of a storm-blown tree along Duke's Creek.
- Benjamin Parks found gold on his birthday in 1828 while walking along a deer path, and subsequently he and his business partner, Joel Stephens, leased the site from Reverend O'Barr.

However, these stories have no contemporary documents to support their validity.

== Gold rush ==
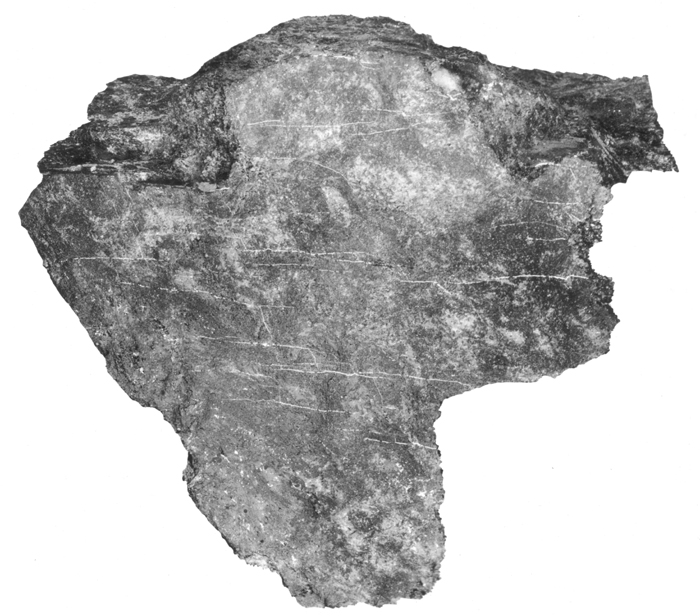
Gold veinlets (they appear white) in a sample of gneiss from the Battle Branch Mine in Lumpkin County

No matter who made the gold discovery in 1828, the gold rush started in 1829 in Lumpkin County and began spreading rapidly. One of the first public accounts was on August 1, 1829, when the Georgia Journal (a Milledgeville newspaper), ran the following notice.

GOLD.—A gentleman of the first respectability in Habersham county, writes us thus under date of 22d July: "Two gold mines have just been discovered in this county, and preparations are making to bring these hidden treasures of the earth to use." So it appears that what we long anticipated has come to pass at last, namely, that the gold region of North and South Carolina would be found to extend into Georgia.

The Macon Telegraph reported that in "the winter of 1829 and 30, when the precious metals having been discovered in great abundance upon our Cherokee soil, great numbers of people from Georgia and other States rushed to the Territory in search of its treasures."

Gold was discovered in Carroll County, Georgia, in 1830. Although much of the land on which the gold was found was under the control of the Cherokee, mining operations quickly sprang up in Lumpkin, White, Union, and Cherokee counties in the "Great Intrusion". In the early stages of the gold rush, the majority of the mining was placer mining. By 1830, Nile's Register estimated that there were 4,000 miners working on Yahoola Creek alone, and more than 300 ounces (8.5 kg) of gold per day were being produced in an area from north of Blairsville to the southeast corner of Cherokee County. The Philadelphia Mint received $212,000 in gold from Georgia in 1830.

Other estimates were that in 1831 there were 6,000 to 10,000 miners between the Chestatee River and the Etowah River. Boomtowns, including Auraria and Dahlonega, began to appear. Dahlonega was said to have supported 15,000 miners at the height of the gold rush. During this rapid influx of prospectors and settlers, tensions with the Cherokee increased. Before long, gold mines appeared in most counties in the North Georgia mountains, including Georgia's northeasternmost county, Rabun.

The culmination of tensions between the Cherokee and various states, including Georgia, led to the forced migration of Native Americans, later known as the Trail of Tears. President Andrew Jackson authorized the Indian Removal Act in 1830, which would allow a takeover of the gold mining areas among other places. The Cherokee Nation turned to the federal court system to avoid being forced off their ancestral lands. The Supreme Court first ruled in favor of the State of Georgia in the 1831 case Cherokee Nation v. Georgia, but the following year, in Worcester v. Georgia, it reversed this decision to recognize the Cherokee as a sovereign nation. Jackson proceeded with the removal of the remaining Cherokee from the North Georgia gold fields.

The indigenous were not the only people upset by the gold rush into northern Georgia. Enslaved people who either already lived in the state or were trafficked in were made to first dig out and establish tunnels and mine shafts necessary for large scale mining operations, and then worked in the mines producing gold ore. Enslaved women would operate water mills in order to process gold ore and enslaved people worked the Etowah River gold veins. The mines in the south "...extended along the banks of the Etowah River, and employed a mixed-race workforce of enslaved miners and a transient pool of hired white laborers."

The Philadelphia Mint received more than half a million dollars in gold from Georgia in 1832. The state of Georgia held the Gold Lottery of 1832 and awarded land, which had been owned by the Cherokee, to the winners in 40-acre (16-hectare) tracts. The Philadelphia Mint received $1,098,900 in gold from Georgia between 1830 and 1837.

In 1838, the Dahlonega Mint was established by Congress, as a branch of the United States Mint. This was a testimony to the amount of gold being produced in Georgia. The establishment of the Dahlonega Mint seemed to validate the state's actions in the early part of the century to seize Cherokee lands.

Besides panning and other gold-washing machines, efforts shifted to working the lode deposits, or gold-bearing quartz vein mining. This involved digging shafts and tunnels, from three to seven square feet in size, braced by timbers due to the fissures in the rock and the danger of collapse. Most mines stayed above the water table, being no more than thirty feet deep, such as the Allatoona Mine in Bartow County. The deepest was the Loud Mine, in White County, at one hundred and thirty feet.

Large stamp mills appeared in 1833, at the Columbia Mine in McDuffie County. These reduced the ore to fine sand for additional panning, or for separation via mercury amalgamation. Besides the Calhoun Mine, other major gold mines included the Sixes, Logan, Elrod, Battle Branch, Pigeon Roost, Turkey Hill, Free Jim, Holt, Loud, Cleveland, Gordon, Horshaw, Lumsden, and Richardson.

Nevertheless, by the 1840s, gold mining saw a sharp decline, as the gold began to "play out".

== Aftermath ==
When news of the California gold rush reached Georgia, many miners moved west in search of more gold; the assayer of the Dahlonega Mint, M. F. Stephenson, tried to convince them to stay. He declared from the Dahlonega courthouse steps to a crowd of miners, "Why go to California? In that ridge lies more gold than man ever dreamt of. There's millions in it."

Yet, despite the departure of many miners, the mines in the Georgia Gold Belt continued to produce gold for years. Hydraulic mining and blast mining renewed interest in the 1850s. There were some 500 mines in 37 different counties. The Civil War brought most operations to a halt, but a few operations continued after the war, and several mines were reworked in the 1930s, during the Great Depression.

It is estimated that Georgia produced about 870,000 troy ounces (27,000 kg) of gold between 1828 and the mid-20th century, when commercial gold production ceased.

Before they were expelled, the Cherokee gained enough gold-mining experience to participate in later gold rushes in California in 1849 and Colorado in 1859. Cherokee gold miners gave the name to the town of Cherokee, California, as well as to a number of other geographic features in that state's gold-mining region.

Experienced gold miners from Georgia played key roles in the beginning of gold mining in Colorado. Georgia miners Lewis and Samuel Ralston, along with some displaced Georgia Cherokee, noticed placer gold near the present site of Denver, on their way to the Sierra Nevada gold fields in 1850. They returned east in 1857, having failed to strike it rich; they remembered the gold just east of the Rocky Mountains. William Greeneberry Russell led a party of Cherokee and Georgia gold miners back to Colorado in 1858, and they began placer mining along the South Platte River in present-day Denver. Three Auraria Georgians, W. Green, Levi J., and J. Oliver Russell, founded Auraria, Colorado, named after the gold-mining town in Georgia. Auraria merged with Denver in 1860, but the neighborhood is still known as Auraria. The town of Golden, Colorado, is named after Georgia miner Thomas L. Golden. Another Georgia gold miner, John H. Gregory, discovered the first lode gold in Colorado in 1859.

In 1864, four prospectors known as "the Georgians" found one of the early gold placers in Montana, at Last Chance Gulch. The site became the state capital of Helena.

The migration of people down into the South shifted the economy in Georgia, much like it did in California. There were the few who 'made it rich', and that was a boon for the communities, but there was also a surge of people with different skills and backgrounds to further build a more functional and rounded community. However, because of the amount of miners looking to make it big in the industry, whatever fortunes that were made were marginally decreased when they had to be dispersed among more and more miners on the work force.

The Georgia Gold Rush was useful for its additions to the further development in the South, namely in pushing industrialization. This, however, also meant that it disturbed what established communities and economies already existed, both for indigenous people and for those who had already settled there. It led to the destruction of landscapes and geography due to procedures necessary for mining: cutting down forests, stripping away streams, creating dams to block water flow, and settling previously untouched areas.

As seen with the California gold rush, there was also an uptick in criminal rates, including homicide. This was largely due to the opportunity to commit crime because of a lack of developed and consistent punishments for crime in mining communities, made largely of miners. The rise in crime in Georgia has also been attributed to an increase of different minorities settling in the South. This conflict was a consequence of different motivations, including class, race, and claims to land. This has been said to last through the ages and could be a cause of the race disparity in the South that persists today.

== See also ==
- Christopher Bechtler
- Crisson Mine
- Consolidated Mine
