= Lumpkin County, Georgia =

County in Georgia, United States

- County
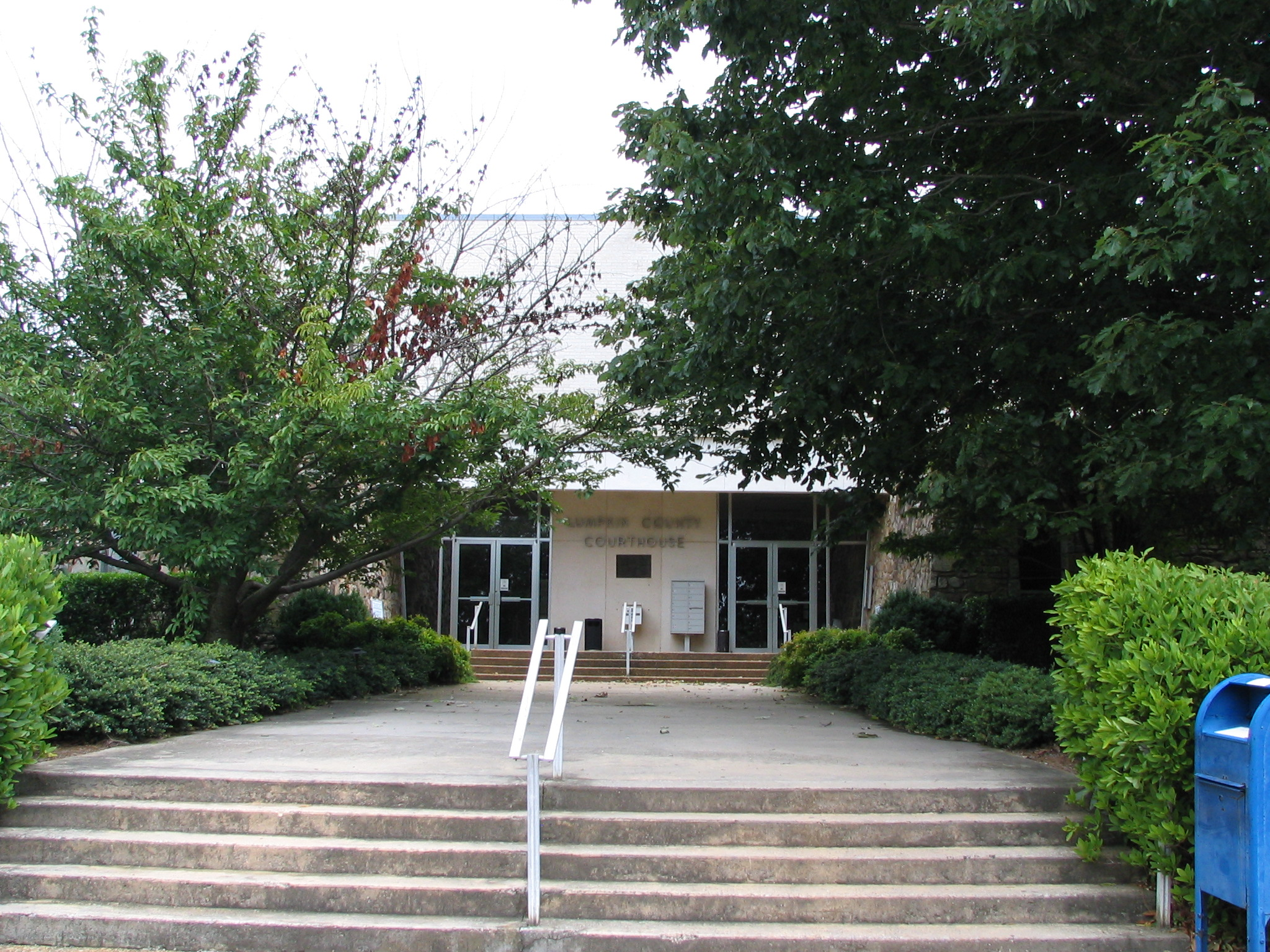
- Lumpkin County Courthouse in Dahlonega

- Seal

- Location within the U.S. state of Georgia
- Coordinates: 34°34′N 84°00′W
- Country: United States
- State: Georgia
- Founded: December 3, 1832; 193 years ago
- Named for: Wilson Lumpkin
- Seat: Dahlonega
- Largest city: Dahlonega

Area
  - Total: 284 sq mi (740 km^{2})
  - Land: 283 sq mi (730 km^{2})
  - Water: 1.3 sq mi (3.4 km^{2}) 0.4%

Population (2020)
  - Total: 33,488
  - Estimate (2025): 36,178 ▲
  - Density: 118/sq mi (45.7/km^{2})
- Time zone: UTC−5 (Eastern)
  - Summer (DST): UTC−4 (EDT)
- Congressional district: 7th
- Website: lumpkincounty.gov

Lumpkin County is a county in the Northeast region of the U.S. state of Georgia. As of the 2020 census, the population was 33,488. Its county seat is Dahlonega. Lumpkin County is included in the Atlanta-Sandy Springs-Roswell, Georgia metropolitan statistical area.

== History ==
This area was settled by the Cherokee, who also occupied areas of what became delimited as southeastern Tennessee and western North Carolina.

Lumpkin County was created on December 3, 1832. The county was named for Wilson Lumpkin, who at the time was Governor of Georgia. Lumpkin's daughter, Martha Wilson Lumpkin Compton, was the namesake of the town named Marthasville, the early-1840s name for Atlanta in Fulton County; this was designated as the capital of the state after the Civil War.

In the 1830s, gold was discovered in the county near Auraria, leading to a rush of miners and development. The U.S. government established a mint in Dahlonega, operating for 23 years until the outbreak of the American Civil War. State contractors later acquired gold from Lumpkin County to gild the dome of the current state capitol building in Atlanta.

=== 20th century to present ===
Agriculture and agritourism are top business industries. In addition, vineyards have been developed here and, since the mid-1990s, Lumpkin County has been recognized as "the heart of Georgia wine country." The county features several vineyards and five licensed wineries, which attract many tourists. In 2015, state senator Steve Gooch introduced Georgia Senate Resolution 125, officially recognizing Lumpkin County as the Wine Tasting Room Capital of Georgia.

The historic Dahlonega Square is also a popular destination. It has gift shops, restaurants, art galleries and artists' studios, and additional tasting rooms.

Lumpkin County is the home of the U.S. Army's Camp Frank D. Merrill, the base of the 5th Ranger Training Battalion of the U.S. Army Ranger School's mountain phase. Camp Frank D. Merrill is located in the northern end of the county, within the Blue Ridge Wildlife Management Area of the Chattahoochee National Forest.

Three veterans' organizations are located in Lumpkin County, to serve the veterans and the community: the Heyward Fields American Legion Post 239, the US Army Mountain Ranger Association, and the Lumpkin and White County Veterans of Foreign Wars Post 5533.

Lumpkin County has an agency to help veterans, the Lumpkin County Veterans Affairs Advisory Committee. This group is in charge of the Lumpkin County Veterans Memorial and the twice yearly veterans' memorial crosses, which are installed to line both sides of the major roads in Dahlonega from mid-May through the Fourth of July, and again for the month of November. The crosses are adorned with the names of the county's veterans who have died, some in combat (marked with KIA), and those who returned home and later died.

== Geography ==
According to the U.S. Census Bureau, the county has a total area of 284 square miles (740 km^{2}), of which 283 square miles (730 km^{2}) is land and 1.3 square miles (3.4 km^{2}) (0.4%) is water.

The county is located in the Blue Ridge Mountains. The summit of Blood Mountain, which Lumpkin County shares with Union County to the north, is the highest point in the county. At 4,458 feet (1,359 m), Blood Mountain is the fifth-highest peak in Georgia and the highest point on Georgia's portion of the Appalachian Trail.

The western 40% of Lumpkin County is located in the Etowah River sub-basin of the ACT River Basin (Alabama-Coosa-Tallapoosa River Basin), while the eastern 60% of the county is located in the Upper Chattahoochee River sub-basin of the ACF River Basin (Apalachicola-Chattahoochee-Flint River Basin).

Penitentiary Cove is located in the north/northwest part of Lumpkin County.

=== Major highways ===
- U.S. Route 19
  - U.S. Route 19 Business
- U.S. Route 129 / State Route 11
- State Route 9
- State Route 52
- State Route 60
  - State Route 60 Business
- State Route 115
- State Route 400

=== Adjacent counties ===
- Union County – north
- White County – east
- Hall County – southeast
- Dawson County – west
- Fannin County – northwest

=== National protected area ===
- Chattahoochee National Forest (part)

== Communities ==
=== City ===
- Dahlonega

=== Ghost town ===
- Auraria

== Demographics ==
Historical population
Census	Pop.	Note	%±
1840	5,671		—
1850	8,955		57.9%
1860	4,626		−48.3%
1870	5,161		11.6%
1880	6,526		26.4%
1890	6,867		5.2%
1900	7,433		8.2%
1910	5,444		−26.8%
1920	5,240		−3.7%
1930	4,927		−6.0%
1940	6,223		26.3%
1950	6,574		5.6%
1960	7,241		10.1%
1970	8,728		20.5%
1980	10,762		23.3%
1990	14,573		35.4%
2000	21,016		44.2%
2010	29,966		42.6%
2020	33,488		11.8%
2025 (est.)	36,178	▲	8.0%
U.S. Decennial Census; 1790-1880 1890-1910; 1920-1930 1930-1940; 1940-1950 1960-1980; 1980-2000 2010

=== Racial and ethnic composition ===
Lumpkin County, Georgia – Racial and ethnic composition Note: the US Census treats Hispanic/Latino as an ethnic category. This table excludes Latinos from the racial categories and assigns them to a separate category. Hispanics/Latinos may be of any race.
Race / Ethnicity (NH = Non-Hispanic)	Pop 1980	Pop 1990	Pop 2000	Pop 2010	Pop 2020	% 1980	% 1990	% 2000	% 2010	% 2020
White alone (NH)	10,293	13,844	19,381	27,519	29,241	95.64%	95.00%	92.22%	91.83%	87.32%
Black or African American alone (NH)	232	237	306	310	412	2.16%	1.63%	1.46%	1.03%	1.23%
Native American or Alaska Native alone (NH)	161	235	198	167	151	1.50%	1.61%	0.94%	0.56%	0.45%
Asian alone (NH)	9	42	75	133	257	0.08%	0.29%	0.36%	0.44%	0.77%
Native Hawaiian or Pacific Islander alone (NH)	x	x	14	24	21	x	x	0.07%	0.08%	0.06%
Other race alone (NH)	0	2	16	10	118	0.00%	0.01%	0.08%	0.03%	0.35%
Mixed race or Multiracial (NH)	x	x	298	459	1,498	x	x	1.42%	1.53%	4.47%
Hispanic or Latino (any race)	67	213	728	1,344	1,790	0.62%	1.46%	3.46%	4.49%	5.35%
Total	10,762	14,573	21,016	29,966	33,488	100.00%	100.00%	100.00%	100.00%	100.00%

=== 2020 census ===
As of the 2020 census, there were 33,488 people, 11,676 households, and 7,800 families residing in the county.

The median age was 36.7 years, with 17.3% of residents under the age of 18 and 18.2% aged 65 or older. For every 100 females there were 96.0 males, and for every 100 females age 18 and over there were 94.5 males age 18 and over. About 19.4% of residents lived in urban areas, while 80.6% lived in rural areas.

The racial makeup of the county was 88.8% White, 1.3% Black or African American, 0.6% American Indian and Alaska Native, 0.8% Asian, 0.1% Native Hawaiian and Pacific Islander, 2.1% from some other race, and 6.4% from two or more races. Hispanic or Latino residents of any race comprised 5.3% of the population.

There were 11,676 households in the county, of which 27.4% had children under the age of 18 living with them and 24.2% had a female householder with no spouse or partner present. About 24.5% of all households were made up of individuals and 11.0% had someone living alone who was 65 years of age or older.

There were 13,006 housing units, of which 10.2% were vacant. Among occupied housing units, 72.4% were owner-occupied and 27.6% were renter-occupied. The homeowner vacancy rate was 1.3% and the rental vacancy rate was 8.2%.

== Education ==
Lumpkin County School System manages and operates the public schools. There is one high school (Lumpkin County High School), one middle school (Lumpkin County Middle School), and three elementary schools (Long Branch Elementary School, Blackburn Elementary School, and Cottrell Elementary). The University of North Georgia has its campus in Lumpkin County.

== Politics ==
As of the 2020s, Lumpkin County is a strongly Republican voting county, voting 81% for Donald Trump in 2024. For elections to the United States House of Representatives, Lumpkin County is part of Georgia's 7th congressional district, currently represented by Rich McCormick. For elections to the Georgia State Senate, Lumpkin County is part of District 50. For elections to the Georgia House of Representatives, Lumpkin County is part of District 9.

United States presidential election results for Lumpkin County, Georgia
Year	Republican		Democratic		Third party(ies)	
Year	No.	%	No.	%	No.	%
1912	29	6.52%	297	66.74%	119	26.74%
1916	55	8.08%	455	66.81%	171	25.11%
1920	205	56.94%	155	43.06%	0	0.00%
1924	111	23.22%	357	74.69%	10	2.09%
1928	381	40.49%	560	59.51%	0	0.00%
1932	81	8.06%	924	91.94%	0	0.00%
1936	160	20.59%	617	79.41%	0	0.00%
1940	165	15.46%	899	84.25%	3	0.28%
1944	212	19.13%	896	80.87%	0	0.00%
1948	142	19.22%	547	74.02%	50	6.77%
1952	370	27.07%	997	72.93%	0	0.00%
1956	486	41.22%	693	58.78%	0	0.00%
1960	495	36.13%	875	63.87%	0	0.00%
1964	855	41.81%	1,189	58.14%	1	0.05%
1968	687	32.24%	396	18.58%	1,048	49.18%
1972	1,477	79.32%	385	20.68%	0	0.00%
1976	547	19.21%	2,301	80.79%	0	0.00%
1980	1,024	33.19%	1,951	63.24%	110	3.57%
1984	1,991	64.21%	1,110	35.79%	0	0.00%
1988	2,688	67.20%	1,286	32.15%	26	0.65%
1992	1,972	39.16%	2,010	39.91%	1,054	20.93%
1996	2,576	49.86%	1,949	37.73%	641	12.41%
2000	4,427	65.59%	2,121	31.42%	202	2.99%
2004	6,690	75.35%	2,091	23.55%	97	1.09%
2008	8,326	74.95%	2,586	23.28%	196	1.76%
2012	8,647	78.98%	2,055	18.77%	246	2.25%
2016	9,619	76.85%	2,220	17.74%	678	5.42%
2020	12,163	78.24%	3,126	20.11%	256	1.65%
2024	14,339	80.52%	3,356	18.85%	113	0.63%

United States Senate election results for Lumpkin County, Georgia2
Year	Republican		Democratic		Third party(ies)	
Year	No.	%	No.	%	No.	%
2020	11,941	77.73%	2,926	19.05%	496	3.23%
2020	10,877	79.41%	2,820	20.59%	0	0.00%

United States Senate election results for Lumpkin County, Georgia3
Year	Republican		Democratic		Third party(ies)	
Year	No.	%	No.	%	No.	%
2020	7,074	46.20%	2,042	13.34%	6,196	40.46%
2020	10,831	79.06%	2,868	20.94%	0	0.00%
2022	9,765	77.05%	2,539	20.03%	369	2.91%
2022	9,005	79.38%	2,339	20.62%	0	0.00%

Georgia Gubernatorial election results for Lumpkin County
Year	Republican		Democratic		Third party(ies)	
Year	No.	%	No.	%	No.	%
2022	10,525	82.63%	2,070	16.25%	142	1.11%

== See also ==
- National Register of Historic Places listings in Lumpkin County, Georgia
- List of counties in Georgia
- Official county government website
- Development Authority website
