= Fieldhouse (disambiguation) =

Field house or fieldhouse is American English term for an indoor sports arena or stadium.

Fieldhouse, Field House or Fields House may also refer to:

== People ==
- David Fieldhouse (1925–2018), English historian of the British Empire
- H. Noel Fieldhouse (d. 1983), Canadian historian
- Homer Fieldhouse (1928–2008), American landscape architect
- Janet Fieldhouse (b. 1971), Australian ceramic artist
- John Fieldhouse, Baron Fieldhouse (1928–1992), Royal Navy Admiral of the Fleet
- John Fieldhouse (rugby league) (b. 1962), English rugby league footballer
- Roger Fieldhouse (1940–2020), British historian
- Simon Fieldhouse (b. 1956), Australian artist/painter

== Residences ==
=== United Kingdom ===
- Field House, Sowerby, West Yorkshire, England

=== United States ===
Alphabetical by state then city

- Eugene Field House (Denver, Colorado), listed on the National Register of Historic Places (NRHP) in Southeast Denver
- Field House (New Hartford, Connecticut) or Sun Terrace, NRHP-listed
- Fields Heirs or Fields House, Middletown, Delaware, formerly NRHP-listed
- J.R. Field Homestead, Indianola, Florida, NRHP-listed
- Field Estate, Sarasota, Florida, NRHP-listed
- Fields Place-Vickery House, Dahlonega, Georgia, NRHP-listed
- Timothy Fields House, Ashland, Kentucky, NRHP-listed in Boyd County
- John Field House, Columbia, Kentucky, NRHP-listed
- Fields' House, Springfield, Kentucky, NRHP-listed in Washington County
- Marshall Field Garden Apartments, Chicago, Illinois, NRHP-listed
- Eugene Field House (Amherst, Massachusetts), a University of Massachusetts Amherst residence hall
- Eugene Field House (St. Louis), Missouri, a National Historic Landmark and NRHP-listed
- Seaman Field House, Deming, New Mexico, NRHP-listed
- Marshall Field, III, Estate, Lloyd Harbor, New York, NRHP-listed
- William Fields House, Greensboro, North Carolina, NRHP-listed
- Walter Field House, Cincinnati, Ohio, NRHP-listed
- Hugh Fields House, Brownsville, Oregon, NRHP-listed in Linn County
- Field Farm, Ferrisburgh, Vermont, NRHP-listed
- James A. Fields House, Newport News, Virginia, NRHP-listed

== See also ==
- Eugene Field House (disambiguation)
- Field Club Historic District, Omaha, Nebraska, NRHP-listed
