= National Register of Historic Places listings in Lumpkin County, Georgia =

This is a list of properties and districts in Lumpkin County, Georgia that are listed on the National Register of Historic Places (NRHP).

This National Park Service list is complete through NPS recent listings posted April 24, 2026.

== Current listings ==
	Name on the Register	Image	Date listed	Location	City or town	Description
1	Blood Mountain Trail Shelter	Blood Mountain Trail Shelter	January 9, 2013 (#12001145)	Blood Mountain Wilderness Area; 34°44′25″N 83°56′15″W	Blairsville	
2	Calhoun Mine	Calhoun Mine	November 7, 1973 (#73002292)	3 miles (4.8 km) south of Dahlonega off GA 60; 34°33′43″N 83°59′09″W	Dahlonega	National Historic Landmark
3	Dahlonega Commercial Historic District	Dahlonega Commercial Historic District	April 7, 1983 (#83000235)	Chestates, Park, and Main Sts. 34°31′57″N 83°59′05″W	Dahlonega	
4	Dahlonega Consolidated Gold Mine	Dahlonega Consolidated Gold Mine	February 27, 1980 (#80001111)	Northeast of Dahlonega; 34°32′18″N 83°58′12″W	Dahlonega	
5	Dahlonega Courthouse Gold Museum	Dahlonega Courthouse Gold Museum	August 26, 1971 (#71001100)	U.S. 19; 34°31′57″N 83°59′06″W	Dahlonega	A Georgia state historic site
6	Daniel M. Davis House	Daniel M. Davis House	March 12, 1998 (#98000227)	GA 9, 1.5 miles (2.4 km) southwest of the junction with GA 52; 34°30′49″N 84°03′51″W	Dahlonega	
7	Fields Place-Vickery House	Fields Place-Vickery House	December 14, 1978 (#78000994)	W. Main St. and Vickery Dr. 34°31′49″N 83°59′17″W	Dahlonega	
8	Hawkins Street Historic District	Hawkins Street Historic District	May 12, 1995 (#95000504)	Roughly, Hawkins St. from Church St. to N. Meaders St., including adjacent parts of Water, N. Chestatee and N. Park Sts. 34°32′00″N 83°59′11″W	Dahlonega	
9	Holly Theatre	Holly Theatre	February 21, 2002 (#02000080)	69 W. Main St. 34°31′53″N 83°59′09″W	Dahlonega	
10	Lumpkin County Jail	Lumpkin County Jail	September 13, 1985 (#85002086)	Clarksville St. 34°32′03″N 83°58′54″W	Dahlonega	
11	Price Memorial Hall	Price Memorial Hall	January 20, 1972 (#72000387)	College Ave. 34°31′47″N 83°59′13″W	Dahlonega	
12	Seven Oaks	Seven Oaks	July 15, 1982 (#82002452)	177 S. Park St. 34°31′51″N 83°58′56″W	Dahlonega	
