= Montaluce =

Coordinates: 34.564372°N 84.066960°W

Montaluce Winery & Estates was established in 2007 as a winery-based community in Dahlonega, Georgia, 40 miles (64 km) North of Atlanta. Founded in partnership between Atlanta-based Beecham Builders, Greenway Development and Harrison Design Associates, Montaluce started as an ambitious vision to create a winery-centric, residential community with 300 Tuscan-inspired homes. Modest cottage lots began selling at $400,000 and Estate lots along the Etowah River cost upwards of $600,000. Finished homes in 2007 ranged between $800,000 and $1.2 million with a goal to finish the 400 acre project within five to six years. A total of 54 lots sold and 19 homes were built before the project stalled during the Great Recession with new owners acquiring the winery and unsold lots in 2014.

Today Montaluce continues to operate as a mixed use development. Montaluce Winery and Estates is the private residential community located at 501 Hightower Church Road, Dahlonega GA 30533.

Montaluce Winery and Restaurants is the commercial hub featuring a winery, tasting room, wedding venue and restaurants located at 946 Via Montaluce, Dahlonega, GA 30533. Select private villas are available for short term rentals.
