= Price Memorial Hall =

- U.S. National Register of Historic Places
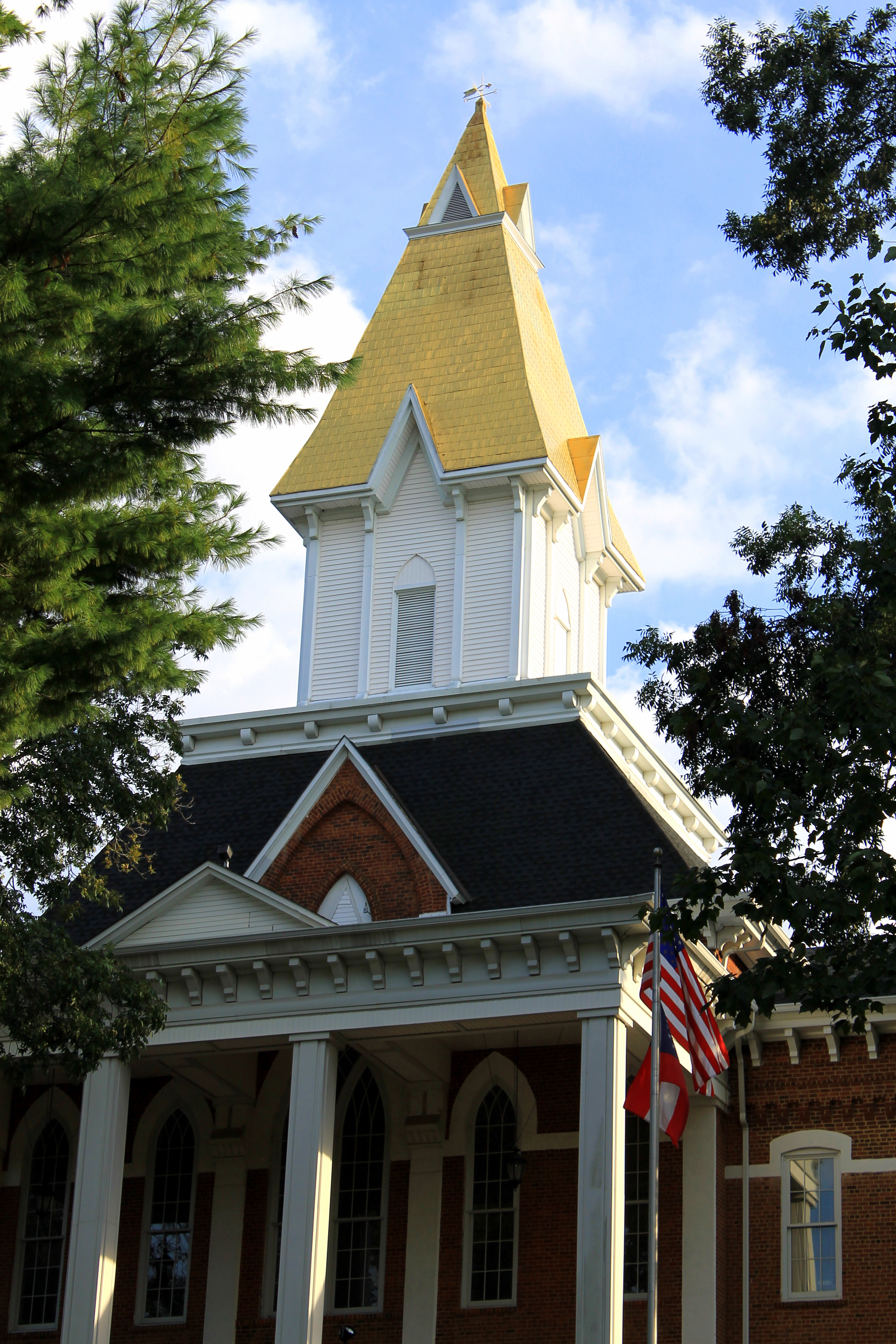

- Location within Georgia Location within the United States
- Location: 82 College Circle, Dahlonega, Georgia
- Coordinates: 34°31′47″N 83°59′13″W
- Area: less than one acre
- Built: 1879
- NRHP reference No.: 72000387
- Added to NRHP: January 20, 1972

Price Memorial Hall, also known as the Price Memorial Building, is a historic site in Dahlonega, Georgia. The hall was built on the site of the U.S. government's federal branch mint built in 1836. It burned down in 1878 and the university, one of the first Federal Land Grant Colleges, had its hall built on the foundation. A historical marker is located on the site.

It was added to the National Register of Historic Places on January 20, 1972. It is located on 82 College Circle.

== UNG ==
Price Memorial Hall is the oldest surviving building on the University of North Georgia's Dahlonega campus. It currently serves as the campus's main administrative office building.

== William Pierce Price ==
It was officially renamed in honor of UNG's founder and former Board of Trustees president, William P. Price, in 1934. Price, who was also a U.S. Representative, worked diligently with the Morrill Act to ensure the university's creation as both an agricultural and military college. Prior to Price's death, Price Memorial Hall was simply known as the "main building."

== The Gold Steeple ==
The gold steeple was added to the University of North Georgia's Price Memorial Hall in 1972 with genuine Dahlonega gold. Dahlonega was where the nation's first major gold rush began in 1828. The process consisted of taking 13 ounces of gold and flattening it out to fit the size of the steeple in several sheets. The renovation was the first time the steeple had been replaced, and the project cost almost $100,000. It is the second building in Georgia to use Dahlonega gold.

== See also ==
- National Register of Historic Places listings in Lumpkin County, Georgia
