= Lumpkin County Jail =

- Lumpkin County Historical Jail
- U.S. National Register of Historic Places
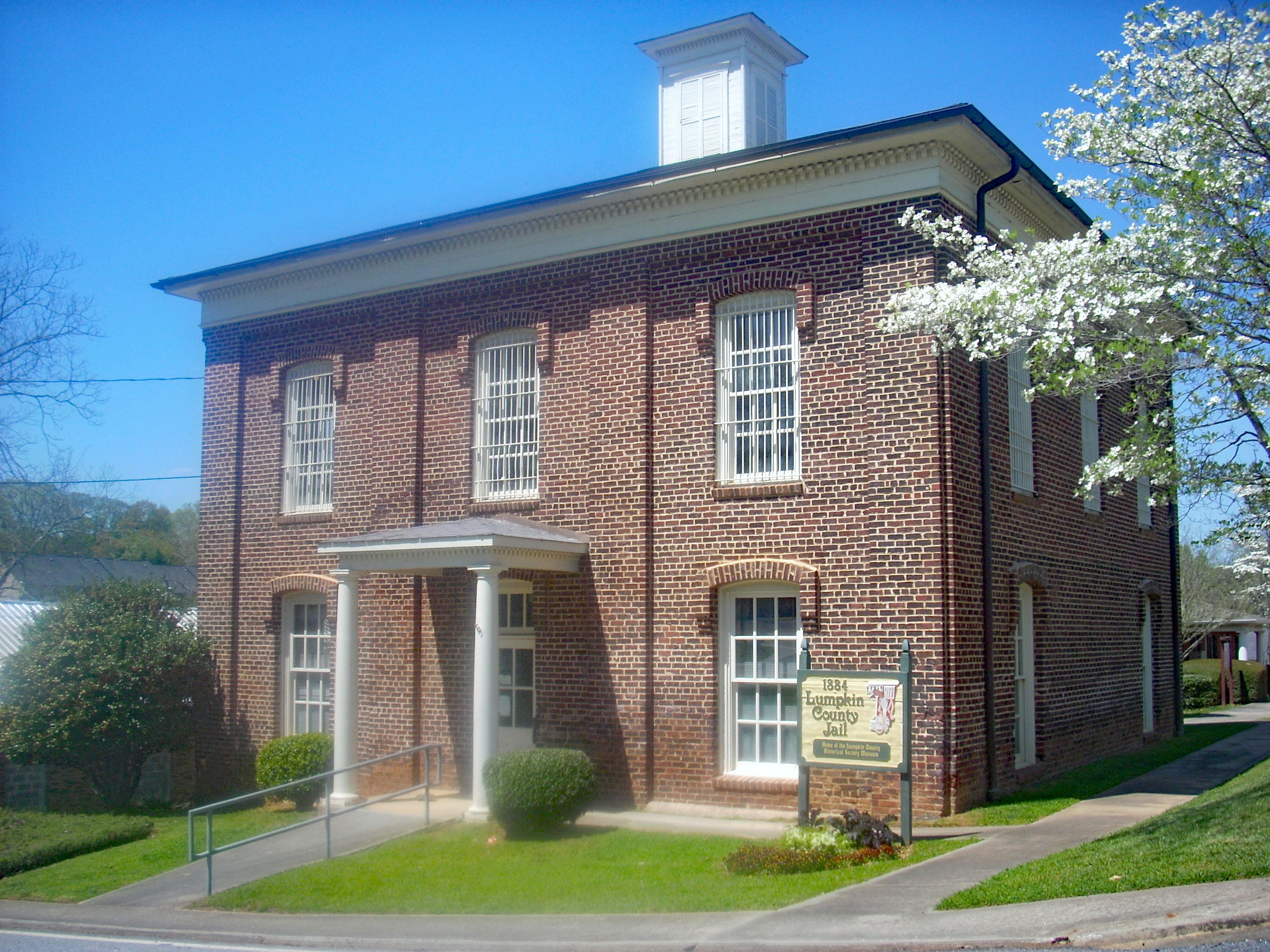

- Location within Georgia
- Location: Clarksville St., Dahlonega, Georgia
- Coordinates: 34.5343°N 83.9816°W
- Area: less than one acre
- Built: 1884
- Built by: Alonzo C. Johnson and Henry Ramsaur
- Architectural style: Italianate
- MPS: County Jails of the Georgia Mountains Area TR
- NRHP reference No.: 85002086
- Added to NRHP: September 13, 1985

The Old Lumpkin County Jail is a historic jail building in Dahlonega, Georgia. The two-story brick jail was built in 1884. The first floor is now used as a museum by the Lumpkin County Historical Society and the second floor has been largely maintained in historic condition. Tours are given during major festivals. Bill Miner a.k.a. the Gentleman Bandit and Grey Fox were held in the jail. The county built a newer jail in 1964. It was added to the National Register of Historic Places on September 13, 1985. It is located on Clarksville Street.

== See also ==
- National Register of Historic Places listings in Lumpkin County, Georgia
