= Eugene Field House =

Eugene Field House may refer to:

- Eugene Field House (Denver, Colorado), listed on the National Register of Historic Places (NRHP) in Southeast Denver
- Eugene Field House (St. Louis), Missouri, a National Historic Landmark and NRHP-listed
- Eugene Field House (Amherst, Massachusetts), a University of Massachusetts Amherst residence hall

== See also ==
- Field House (disambiguation)
