= Holly Theatre (Dahlonega, Georgia) =

- U.S. National Register of Historic Places
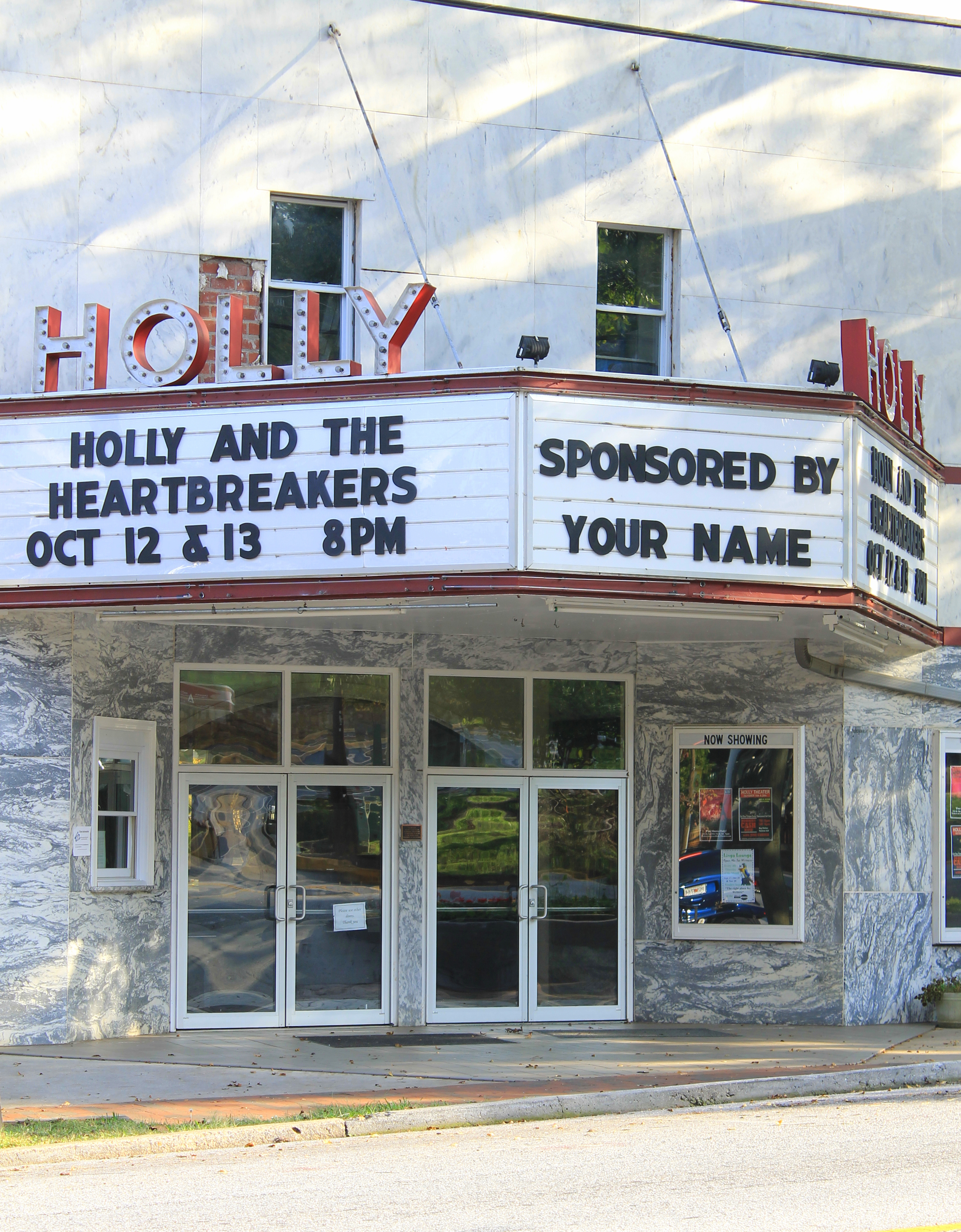

- Location within Georgia Location within the United States
- Location: 69 W. Main St., Dahlonega, Georgia
- Coordinates: 34°31′54″N 83°59′09″W
- Area: 0.1 acres (0.040 ha)
- Built: 1948
- Built by: G.R. Vinson
- Architect: G.R. Vinson
- Architectural style: Moderne
- NRHP reference No.: 02000080
- Added to NRHP: February 21, 2002

Holly Theatre is a historic theater in Dahlonega, Lumpkin County, Georgia, US, which was constructed as a movie theater in 1948, and is currently operated as a non-profit theatrical venue. It puts on performances of musicals and straight plays, generally five mainstage productions a season, and a varying number of children's shows.

Between shows, it hosts concerts and community events, and can be rented for events. Additionally, it provides acting and dance classes for children and adults. It seats 256 on the main level and an additional 50 in the balcony. The building listed on the National Register of Historic Places in 2002.

== See also ==
- National Register of Historic Places listings in Lumpkin County, Georgia
