= Janet Fieldhouse =

Australian ceramic artist

Janet Fieldhouse (born 1971) is a Meriam Mir ceramic artist based in Cairns, Queensland, Australia. Fieldhouse uses a variety of clays and ceramic techniques to recover, reinterpret and represent Ailan Kastom: (Note: Island Custom) the cultural practices, symbols and artistic traditions of her Erub community, particularly the significant roles and contributions of women. Fieldhouse was introduced to ceramics by artist and Thainakuith elder, Thancoupie Gloria Fletcher James. Since then, Fieldhouse has developed her practice through artist residencies in Japan and the United States and a Master of Philosophy (Visual Arts) at the Australian National University in 2010.

Fieldhouse is recovering and celebrating Ailan Kastom through an innovative approach to ceramics. Fieldhouse has been awarded several prizes for her work, including the Indigenous Ceramic Art Prize at Shepparton Art Museum in 2007 and 2012, and has work held in public collections throughout Australia and the United States.

== Early life ==
Janet Fieldhouse was born in Cairns, Queensland, and maintains strong connections with her matrilineal connections to Badu (Mulgrave), Mua (Moa), Kirriri (Hammond) and Erub (Darnley) islands and South Sea Islander communities.

== Career and practice ==
Combining varieties of earthenware, stoneware and porcelain clays with natural fibres, found materials and multimedia, Fieldhouse evokes the foremost importance of a continuing connection to Country and Culture for Torres Strait Islander Peoples. Fieldhouse's work "is an expression of her Torres Strait Islander heritage: the material culture, rituals of social and religious life, and artefacts which are created to fulfil the functional and spiritual needs of the peoples of the Torres Strait," and focusses specifically on the contributions of women to Ailan Kastom.

It is the ceremonial scarification and body adornment of Torres Strait Islander women that is most documented by Fieldhouse's practice. Using Keraflex flexible porcelain, Fieldhouse translates oral histories from Erub and Badu Elders into intricately carved translucent discs, illuminated by light-boxes set beneath the surface in her Comb and Pendant series. Her 2011 work Tattoo is a porcelain piece featuring symbols and imagery from women's scarification traditions which are no longer practiced in the Torres Strait. This work was awarded the Indigenous Ceramic Art Award in 2012. Tattoo is featured in the Shepparton Art Museum online exhibition, "Paradise Again".

In a 2011 exhibition at Vivien Anderson Gallery, "Journey", Fieldhouse combines white raku, red raku and Cool Ice porcelain with feathers, string, acrylic paint, synthetic polymer paint, demonstrating her innovative approach to ceramics. She also incorporates terracotta clay from the Mekong River in Laos, where she travelled in 2010 and worked with local potters. In the same year, Fieldhouse was a featured artist in the Vivien Anderson Gallery group exhibition, "The Women's Show," which showcased the diversity and innovation of Australian First Nations women artists.

== Achievements ==
Fieldhouse has been the recipient of several awards and prizes for her contributions to both contemporary Australian ceramics and Australian First Nations art. In 2018, Fieldhouse was a featured artist in The National in Sydney, exhibiting her Comb and Pendant series in the Museum of Contemporary Art in Sydney, New South Wales.

== Collections ==
- National Gallery of Australia
- National Gallery of Victoria
- Queensland Art Gallery | Gallery of Modern Art
