= Seaman Field House =

- U.S. National Register of Historic Places
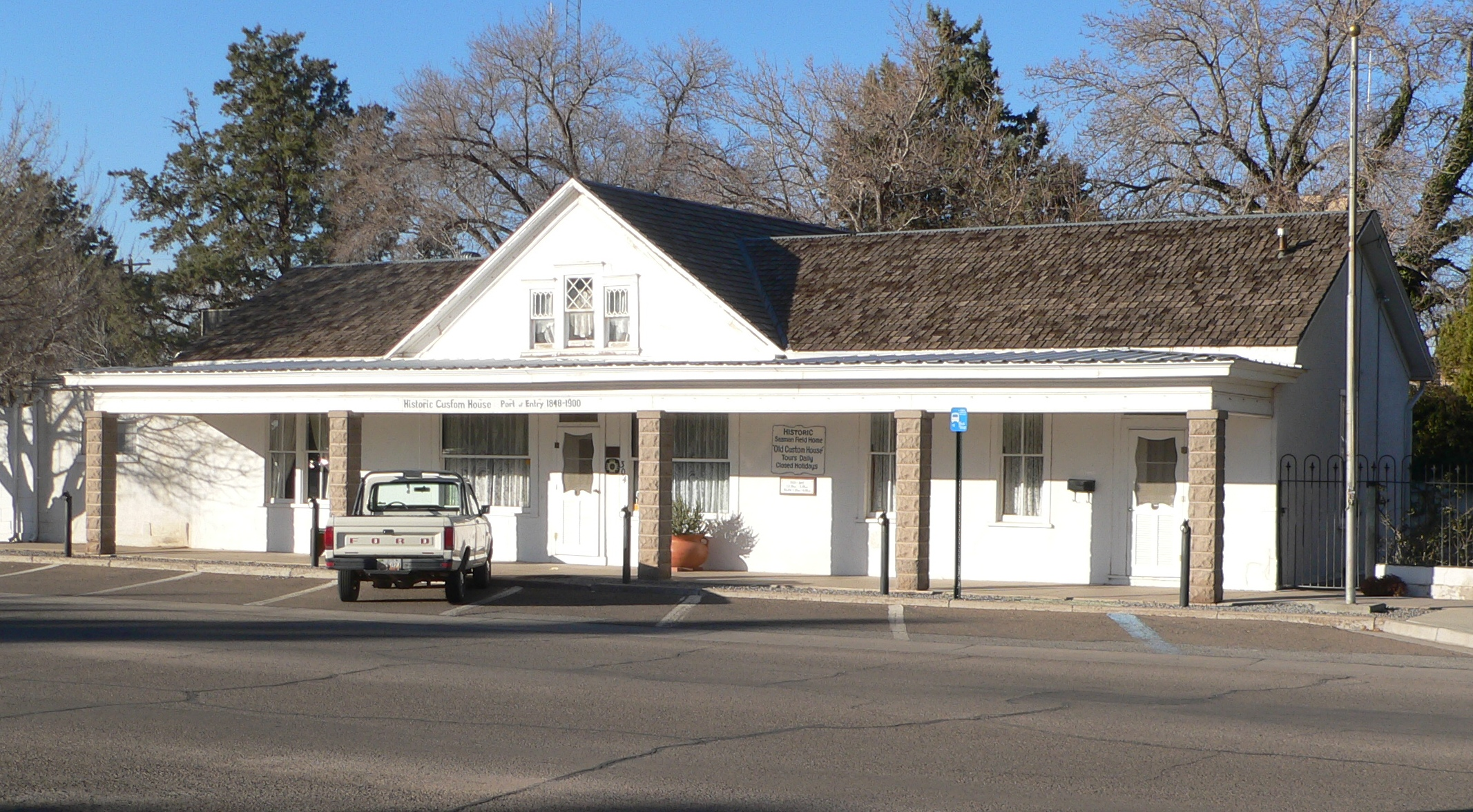

- Location within New Mexico
- Location: 304 Silver Ave., Deming, New Mexico
- Coordinates: 32°16′00″N 107°45′27″W
- Area: less than one acre
- NRHP reference No.: 90000102
- Added to NRHP: February 20, 1990

The Seaman Field House, at 304 Silver Ave. in Deming, New Mexico, was listed on the National Register of Historic Places in 1990.

It has also been known as the United States Customs House. It was home of Seaman Field, who was a collector of customs under President Grover Cleveland's 1885-1889 and 1893-1897 terms. He also served as Deming's first mayor, on the board of trustees for the local high school, and on the board of Regents of the agricultural college, and as a county commissioner and probate judge.

The house is believed to incorporate a poured adobe original house, one of Deming's earliest, built between 1881 and 1886.
