= Fields Place-Vickery House =

Historic house in Georgia, United States

- U.S. National Register of Historic Places
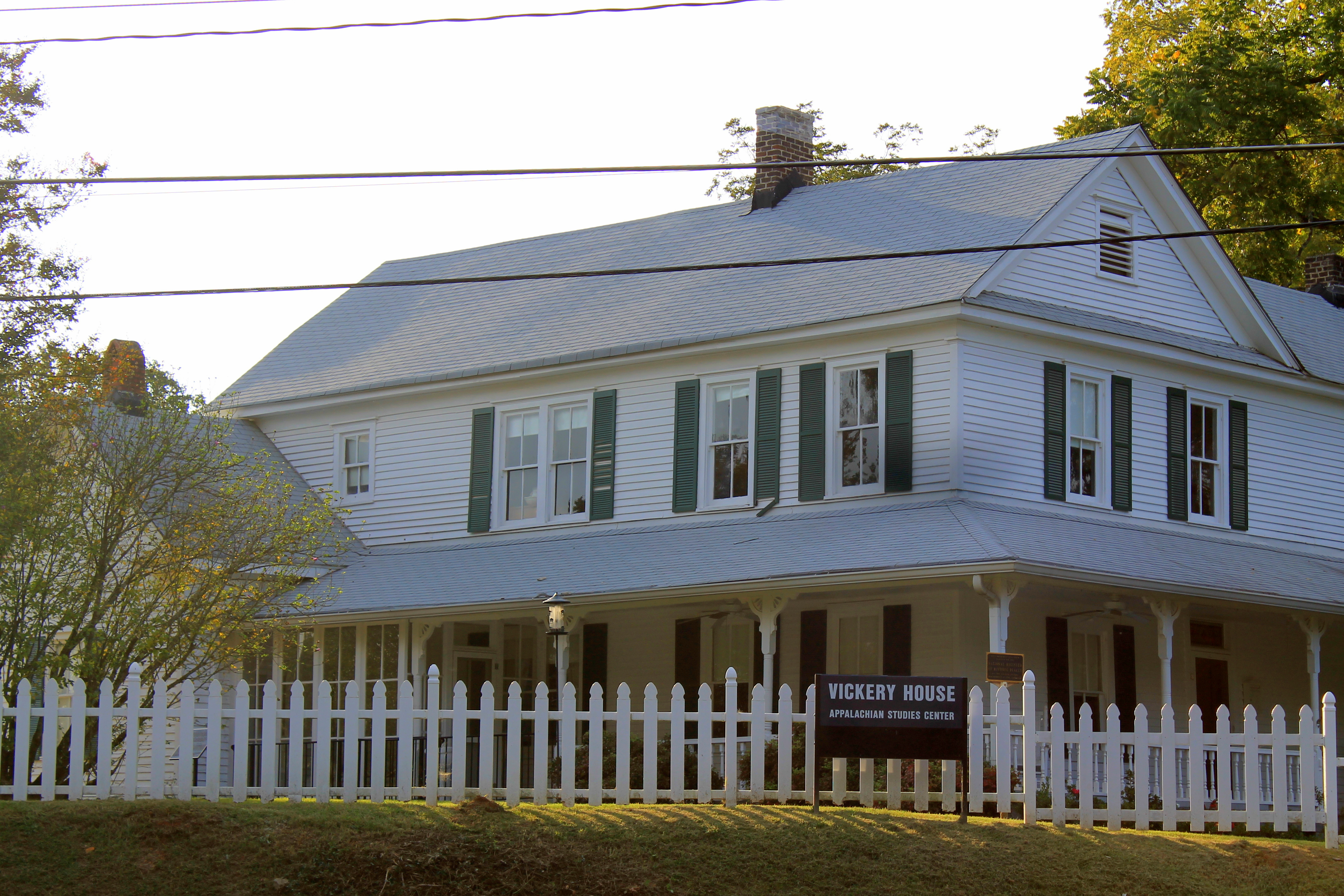
- The Fields Place-Vickery House, pictured as an academic building for the University of North Georgia.

- Location within Georgia Location within the United States
- Location: W. Main St. and Vickery Dr., Dahlonega, Georgia
- Coordinates: 34°31′49″N 83°59′17″W
- Area: 1.4 acres (0.57 ha)
- Built: c.1860, 1908
- Architectural style: Late Victorian
- NRHP reference No.: 78000994
- Added to NRHP: December 14, 1978

Fields Place-Vickery House (often referred to as "the Vickery House") is a historic building located in Dahlonega, Georgia. It is listed on the National Register of Historic Places.

The house is currently owned by the University of North Georgia and houses the university's Georgia Appalachian Studies Center in keeping with the historic significance of the building.

Its fireplace and mantel seem to have been built c.1860 but most of the extant building dates from 1890 to 1908.

== Style ==
The house is Folk Victorian as opposed to high-style Victorian, as the house has Victorian features but retains a simplistic and folksy architectural style, as it was designed for a middle-class family. Victorian features of the home include irregular roof lines, turned porch posts and beaded ceilings. Wainscoting on the lower level of the home is a Victorian feature, but the upper level of the house has unfinished walls. The house has one bathroom, several bedrooms (now used as offices and classrooms) and a kitchen, with an antique farm sink and original cupboards. The doors have louvered windows to keep the house ventilated. The downstairs area has a large, wide hallway, a convention of Victorian architecture. The upstairs has a large landing and several rooms, including a small room which houses the staircase leading to a large attic. The house, in country style, has a large front porch, a back porch leading from the kitchen, and a sunroom. Victorian stained glass was installed by Dr. Elias Benton Vickery in the bathroom.

== History ==
The house was built in 1860 by John D. Fields, the deputy sheriff of Dahlonega and alumnus of the Georgia Agricultural College (now the University of North Georgia). During this time, the house was known as the Old Fields House. The L-shaped house had three rooms, a cellar, a shed porch and a central hall.

In 1869, Weir Boyd, a gold mine owner, Civil War veteran and local politician, purchased the house for $400 at a sheriff's auction. He died in 1893, at which point his daughter, Martha, and her husband, B. P. Gaillard, inherited the house. The couple added three rooms to the rear of the house.

Around 1895, Dr. Elias Benton Vickery, his wife, Ella, and his children, Katherine and Eugene, moved into the house. Vickery renovated the home between 1895 and 1908, replacing the right front room, widening the original hallway, and adding a second story and a bathroom on the first floor. He removed the original porch and installed a new Victorian porch, which ran along the front and left side of the house. He added a screen porch to the rear of the house, which joined the kitchen on the north and east side. A well remains on this porch. Upon Vickery's death in 1929, the house remained empty for years.

In 1974, the house was given to the Dahlonega Club by Vickery family heirs. Ella Ray Oakes, president of the club, travelled to Atlanta to accept the house. The home was a popular place for schoolchildren to tour during the Christmas season. Oakes donated the fence around the house and allocated Dahlonega Club funds to the restoration of the building.

In 2007, the Dahlonega Club donated the house to the University of North Georgia. Since then, the house has been the headquarters of the Georgia Appalachian Studies Center.
