= William Fields House =

Historic house in North Carolina, United States

- U.S. National Register of Historic Places
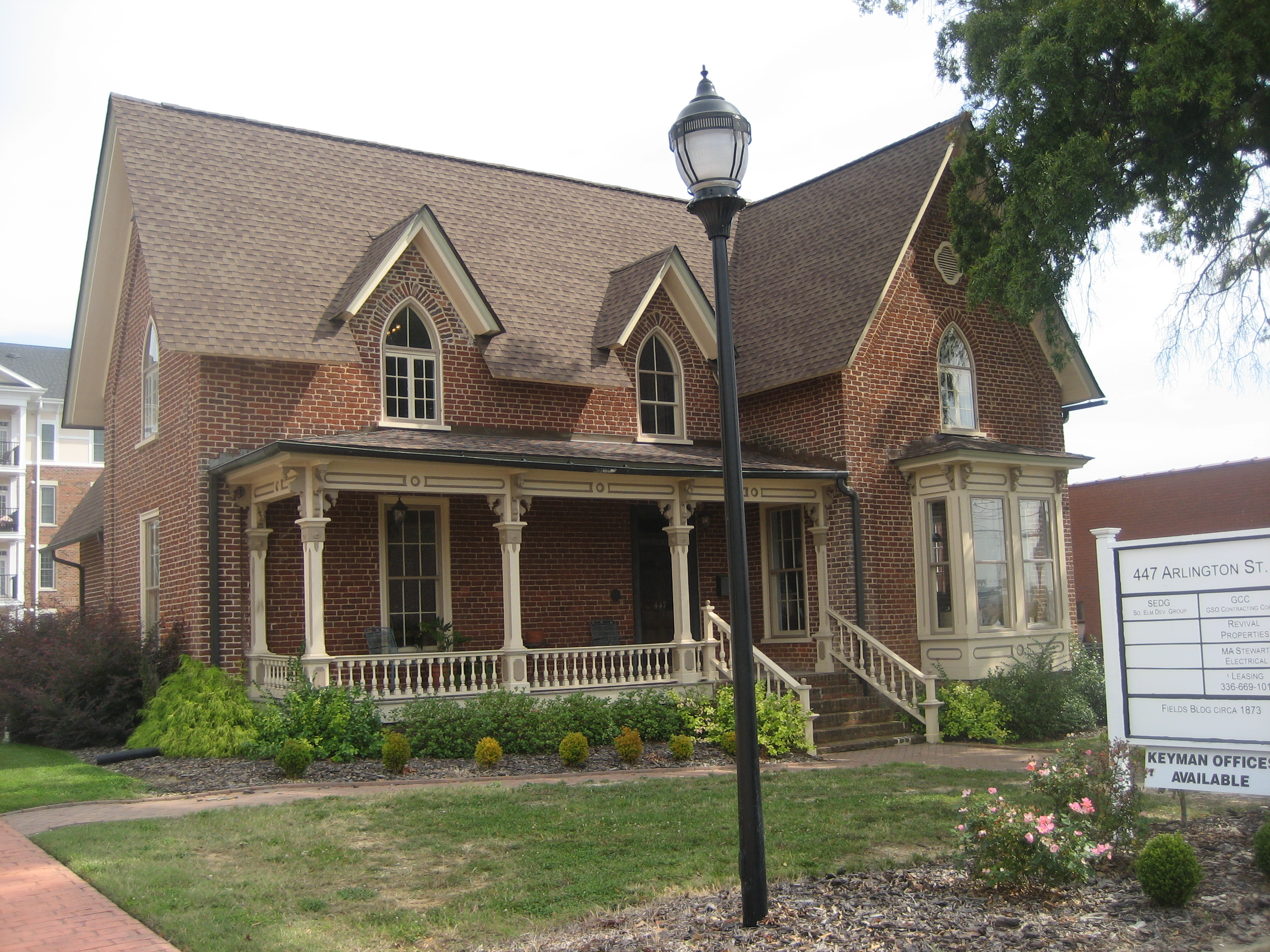
- William Fields House, September 2012

- Location within North Carolina Location within the United States
- Location: 447 Arlington St., Greensboro, North Carolina
- Coordinates: 36°3′54″N 79°47′21″W
- Area: less than one acre
- Built: 1875-1879
- Architectural style: Gothic Revival
- NRHP reference No.: 85003084
- Added to NRHP: December 5, 1985

William Fields House is a historic home located at Greensboro, Guilford County, North Carolina. It was built between 1875 and 1879, and is a 1 1/2-story, three-bay, "T"-plan Gothic Revival-style brick dwelling with a one-story rear wing.

It was listed on the National Register of Historic Places in 1985.
