= Fields Heirs =

Former historic house in Delaware, US

- U.S. National Register of Historic Places
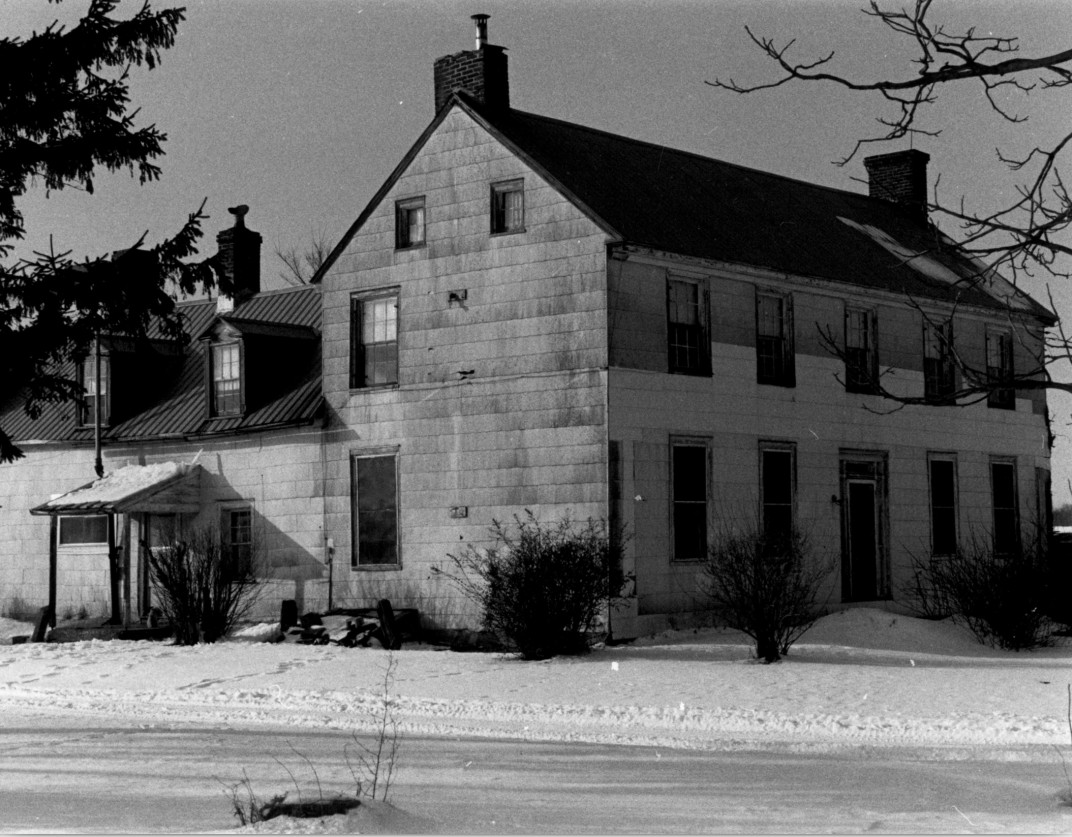
- The house in 1984

- Location within Delaware Location within the United States
- Location: Off Middletown Warwick Road, Middletown, Delaware
- Coordinates: 39.457021°N 75.725314°W
- Area: 3 acres (1.2 ha)
- Built: c. 1820
- Architectural style: Late Victorian, Greek Revival, Federal
- MPS: Rebuilding St. Georges Hundred 1850-1880 TR
- NRHP reference No.: 85002109
- Added to NRHP: September 13, 1985

Fields Heirs, also known as Fields House, was a historic home located at Middletown in New Castle County, Delaware, United States. It was built about 1820, and was a 2 1/2-story, five-bay by two-bay center-hall plan residence with a 1 1/2-story rear wing forming an L-shaped house. It sat on a stone foundation and had a gable roof. Also on the property was a contributing drive-through granary.

It was listed on the National Register of Historic Places in 1985 and demolished between 1992 and 2002.
