= Walter Field House =

Historic house in Ohio, United States

- U.S. National Register of Historic Places
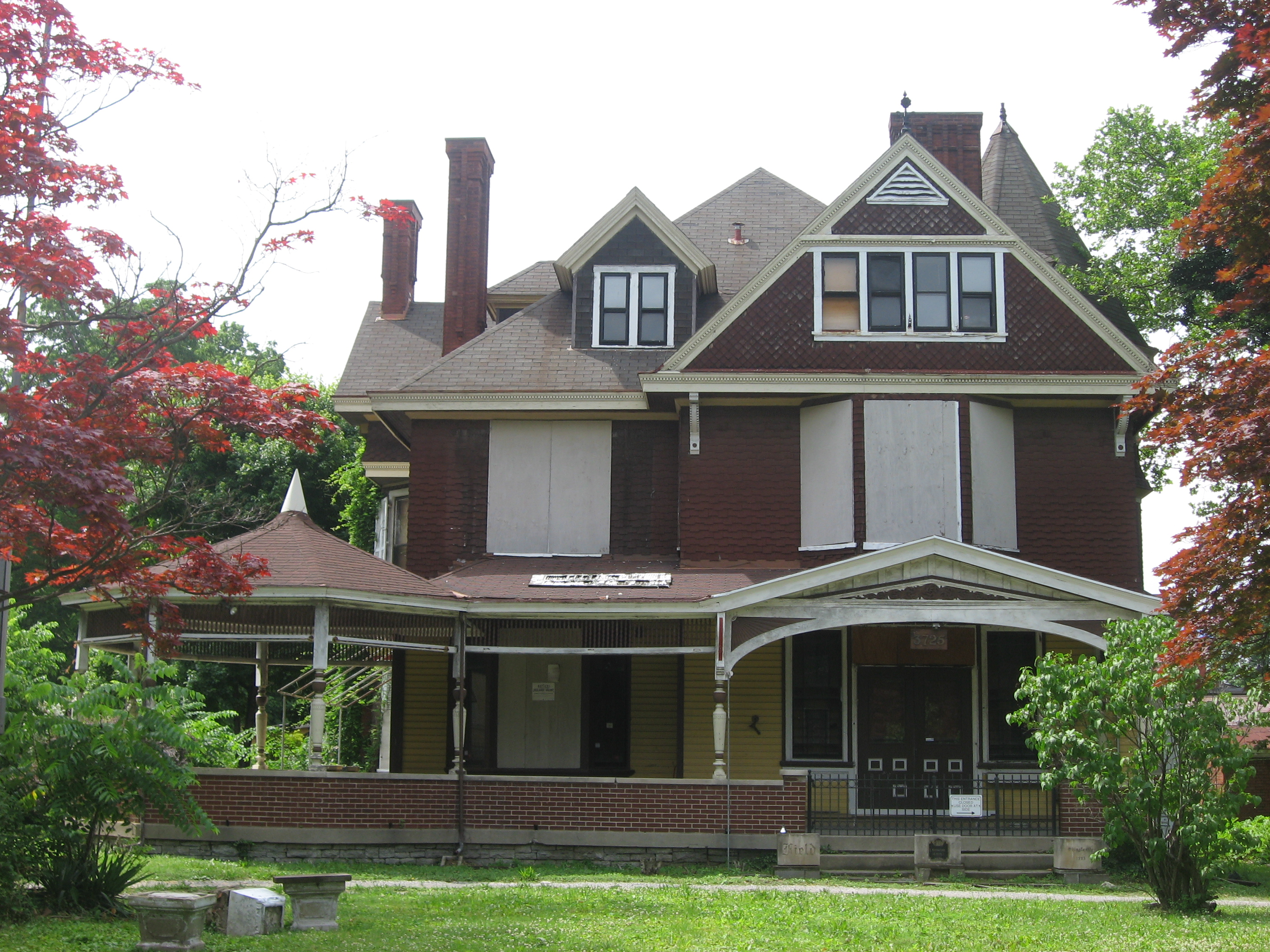
- Front of the house

- Location within Ohio Location within the United States
- Location: 3725 Reading Rd., Cincinnati, Ohio
- Coordinates: 39°9′5″N 84°29′11″W
- Area: Less than 1 acre (0.40 ha)
- Built: 1884
- Architect: Samuel Hannaford
- Architectural style: Shingle Style
- MPS: Samuel Hannaford and Sons TR in Hamilton County
- NRHP reference No.: 80003053
- Added to NRHP: March 3, 1980

The Walter Field House is a historic residence located along Reading Road in northern Cincinnati, Ohio, United States. Built in the 1880s to be the home of a prosperous local businessman, it features elements of popular late-nineteenth-century architectural styles, and it was produced by one of the city's leading architects. It has been named a historic site.

Walter Field was a Cincinnati-area business executive, holding offices such as the presidency of the American Cotton Oil Company and the Cincinnati Ice Manufacturing and Cold Storage Company. He moved into the house soon after its completion in 1884. As the architect for his new residence, Field chose Samuel Hannaford, an English-born architect whose design of the Cincinnati Music Hall had catapulted him into local prestige in the 1870s. Many of Hannaford's surviving houses in Cincinnati are masonry structures, including several built in the mid-1880s, but the Field House is a frame structure. Built at the end of Hannaford's Victorian phase, the Field House includes various Victorian elements, such as the shingles and decorative details characteristic of the Eastlake movement, but the rest of the house is more heavily in the Shingle Style. Its plan is asymmetrical, featuring components such as a multi-gabled roof, a pavilion with large porch across the front, and an eight-sided gazebo on the southern end of the facade. Decorated with a heavily spindled section in the place of the frieze, the porch and gazebo dominate the appearance of the two-and-a-half-story building. Other components, such as a turret on the northern side, are less easily observed from the street.

In 1980, the Field House was listed on the National Register of Historic Places, qualifying because of its historically significant architecture; it was added to the Register as part of a multiple property submission of dozens of Cincinnati buildings designed by Samuel Hannaford. The building is no longer a house; by the time it was added to the Register, an addition had been constructed, and the interior had been chopped up to form twenty-four studio apartments.
