= John Field House =

- U.S. National Register of Historic Places
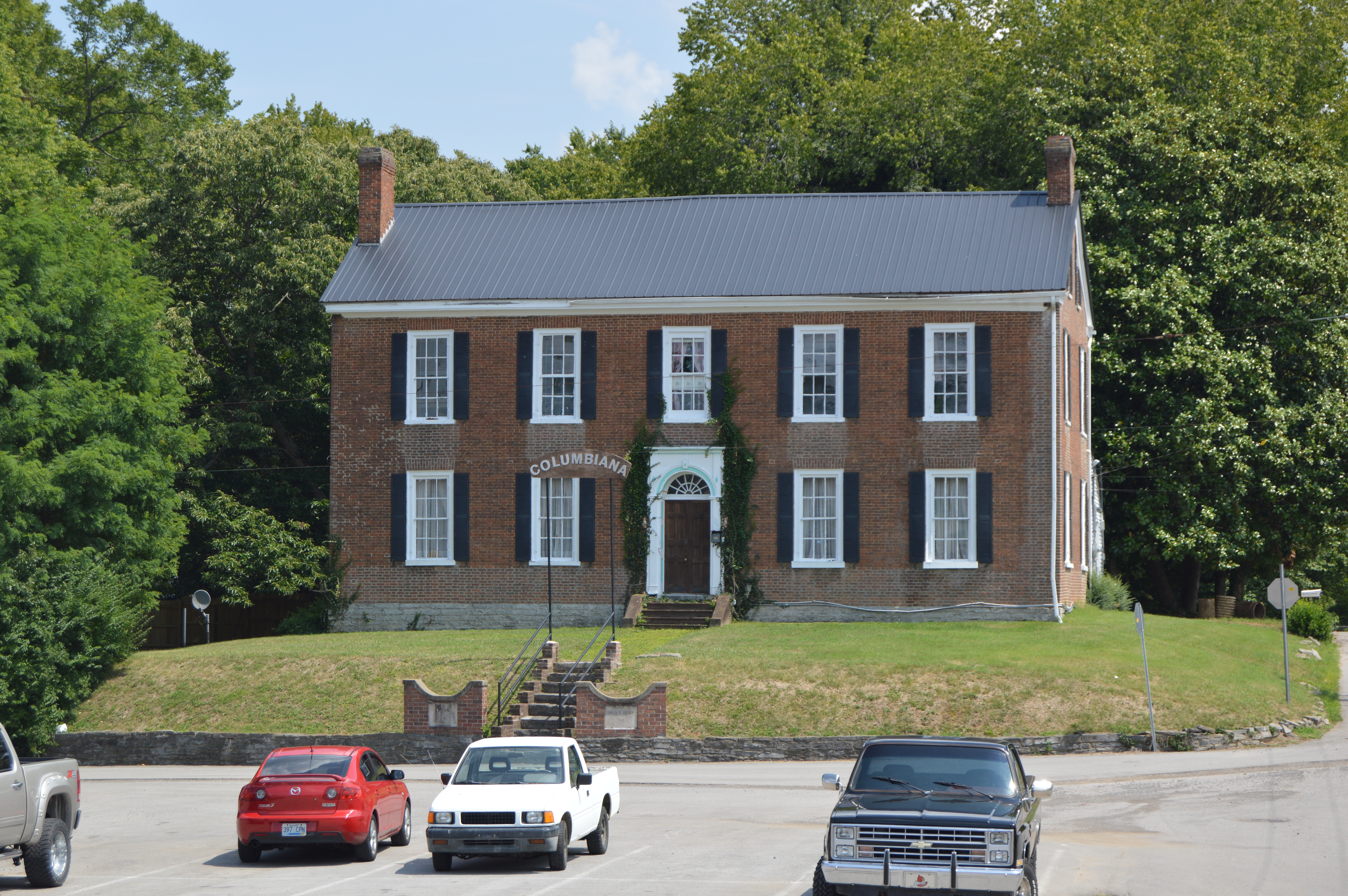

- Location within Kentucky Location within the United States
- Location: 111 E. Fortune St., Columbia, Kentucky
- Coordinates: 37°06′05″N 85°18′22″W
- Area: 0.4 acres (0.16 ha)
- Built: 1812
- Built by: McDowell, James; McDowell, Benjamin
- Architectural style: Federal
- NRHP reference No.: 78001294
- Added to NRHP: February 8, 1978

The John Field House, at 111 E. Fortune St. in Columbia, Kentucky, was built in 1812. It was listed on the National Register of Historic Places in 1978.

It includes Federal architecture.

It was designed and/or built by James McDowell and Benjamin McDowell.
