= Dahlonega Gold Museum Historic Site =

Historic site in the U.S. state of Georgia

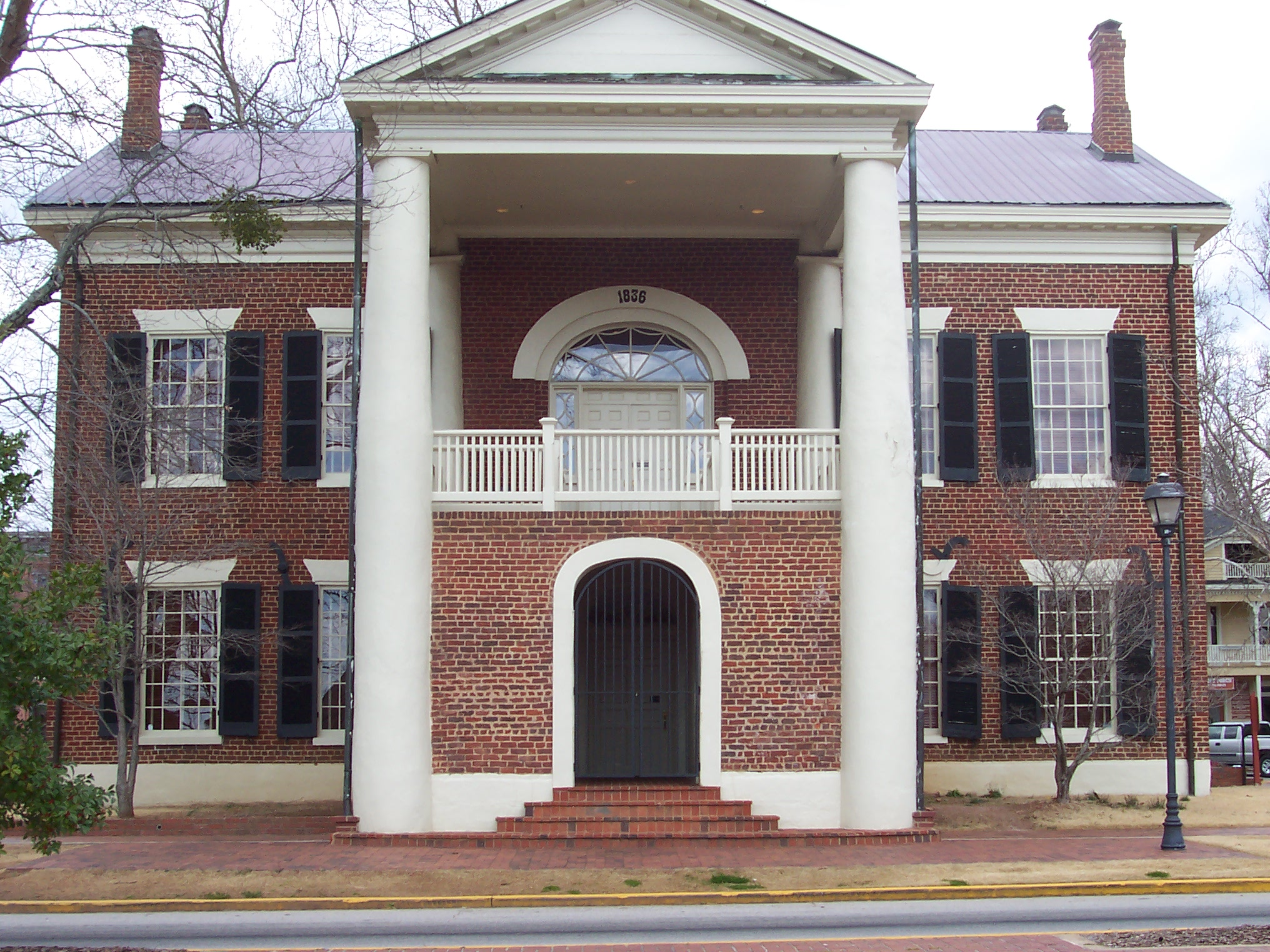
- Dahlonega Gold Museum
- Interactive map of Dahlonega Gold Museum Historic Site
- 34°31′58″N 83°59′06″W
- Location: Dahlonega, Lumpkin County, Georgia, U.S.

History
- Built: 1836

Site notes
- Governing body: Georgia State Parks & Historic Sites
- Website: gastateparks.org/DahlonegaGoldMuseum

The Dahlonega Gold Museum Historic Site is a Georgia state historic site located in Dahlonega that commemorates America's first gold rush and the mining history of Lumpkin County. The museum is housed in the historic Old Lumpkin County Courthouse built in 1836 and located in the center of the town square. It is the oldest surviving county courthouse in the state. The museum houses many artifacts from the gold rush of 1836, including gold nuggets, gold coins, and gold panning equipment, as well as an educational film and gift shop.

== Annual events ==
- Gold Rush Days (October)
- Dahlonega's Old Fashion Christmas Celebration (December)
- Dahlonega Gold Museum Open House (December)

== Gallery ==
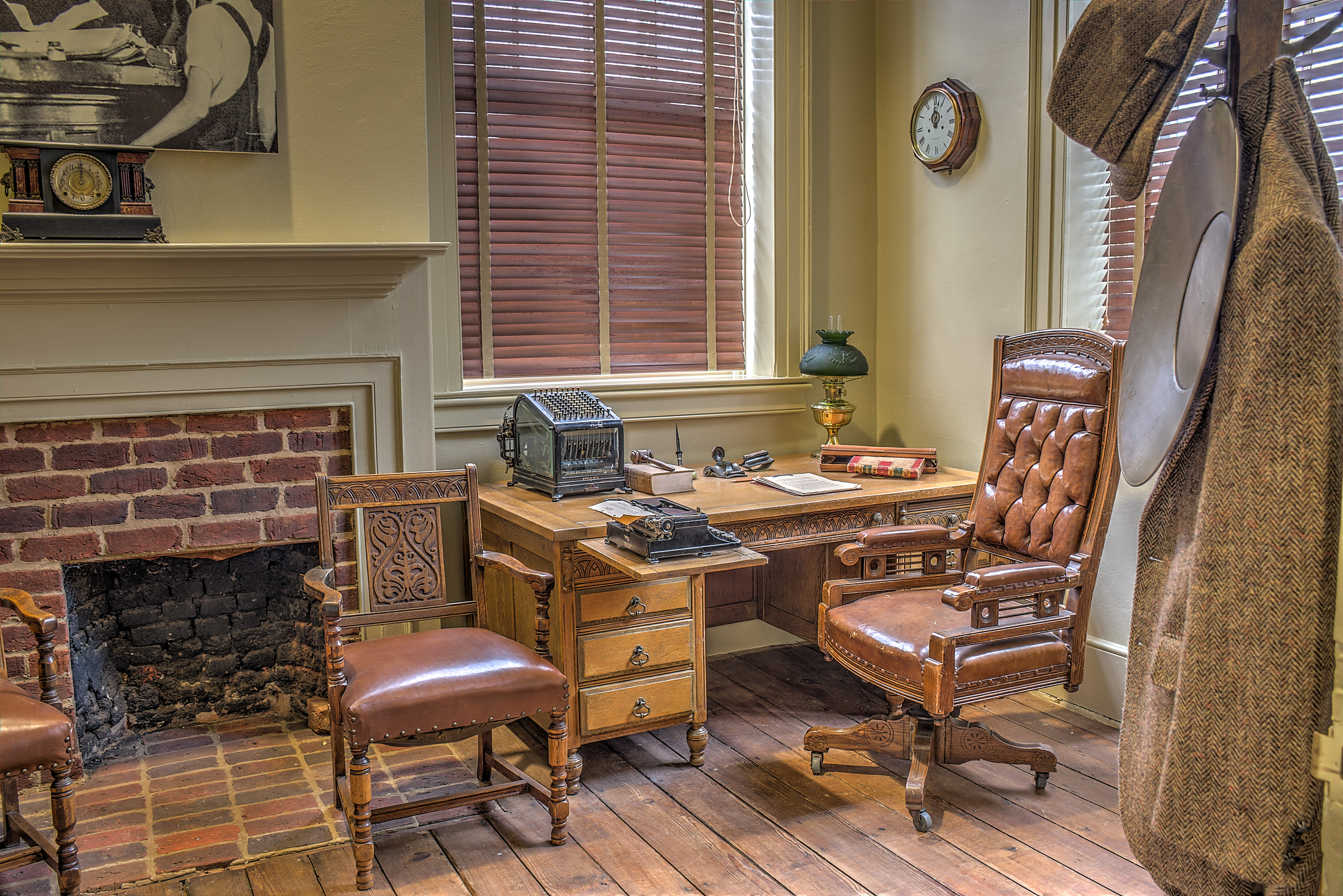
judge's chamber

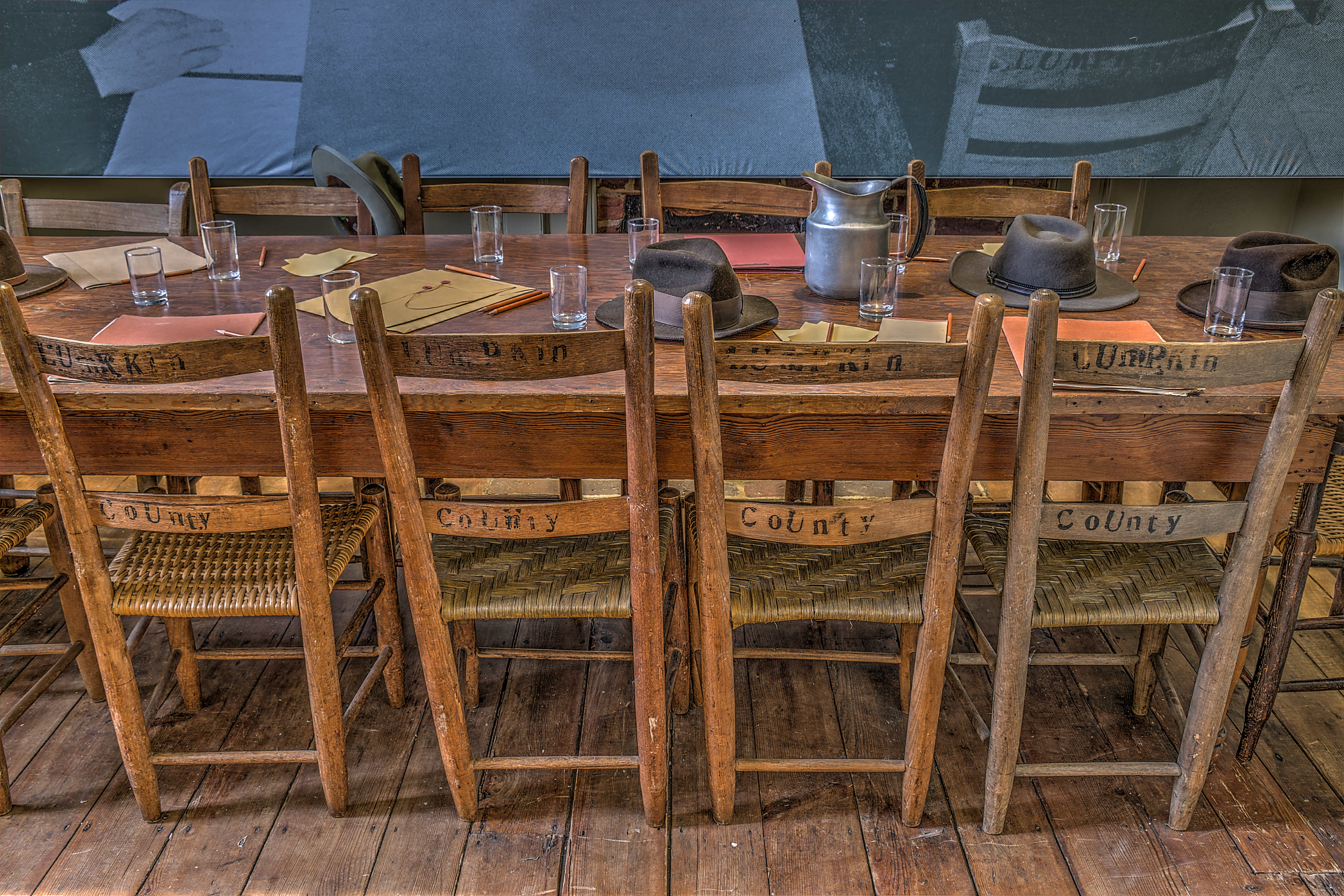
jury room

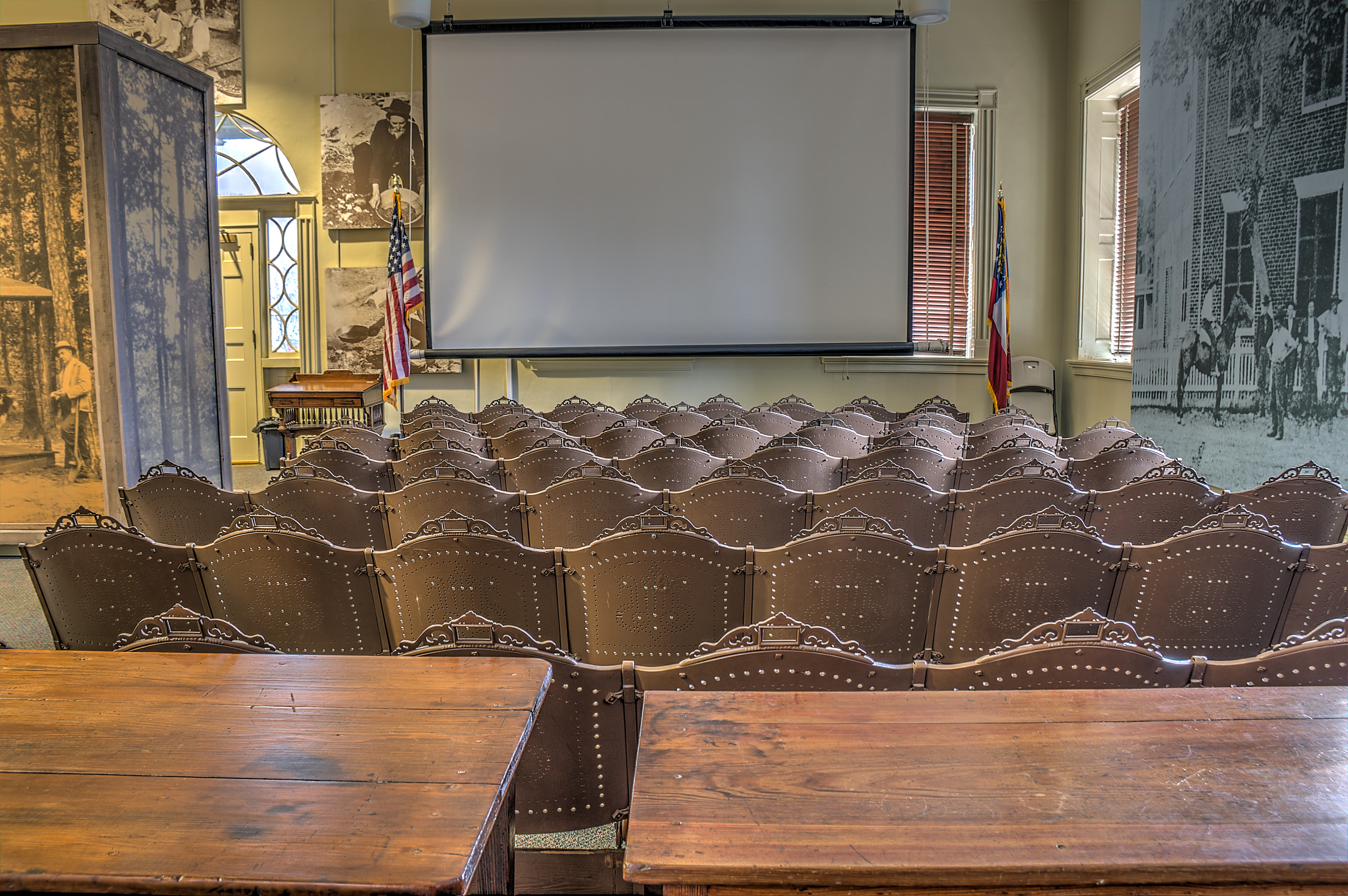
theater / courthouse

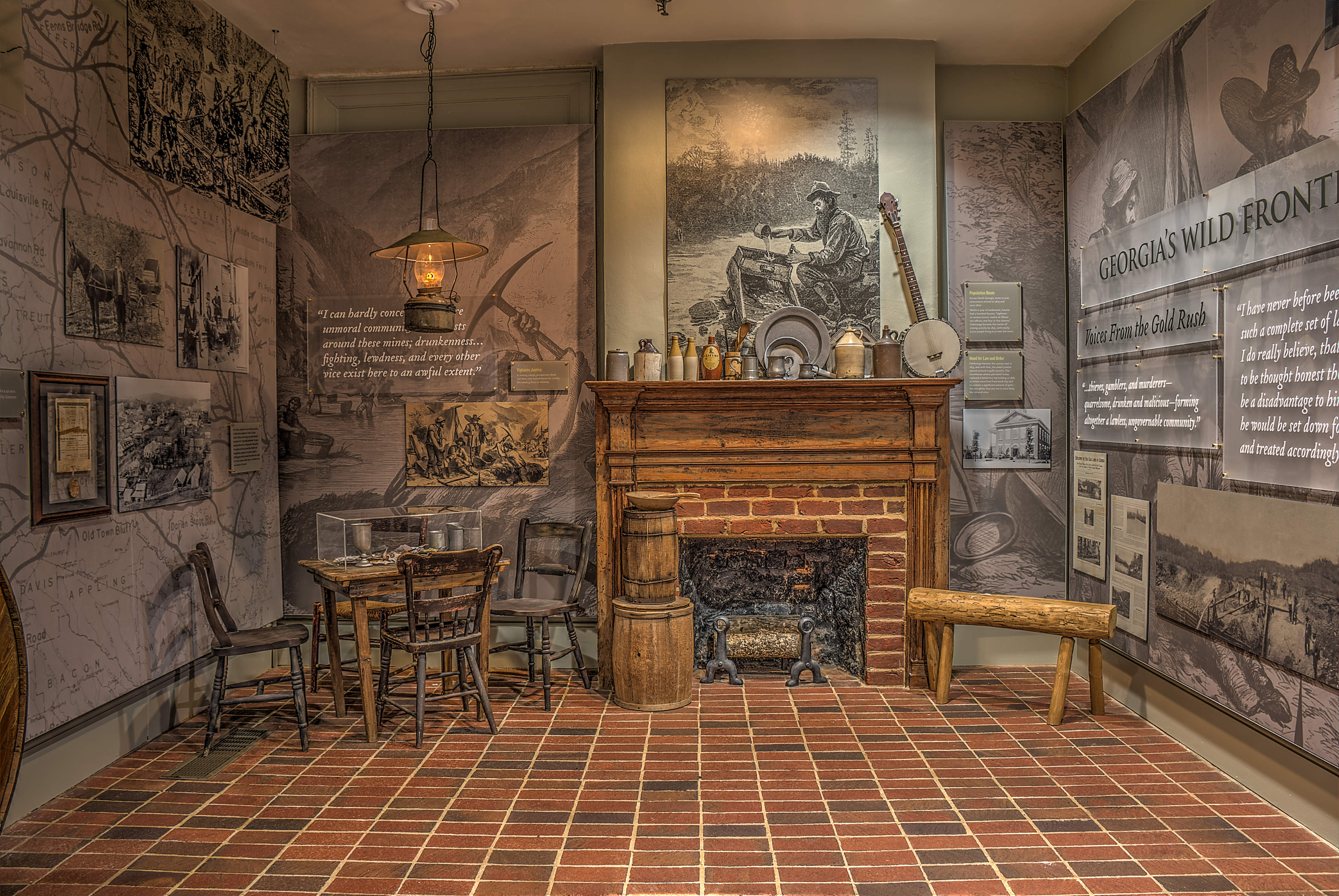
museum exhibit

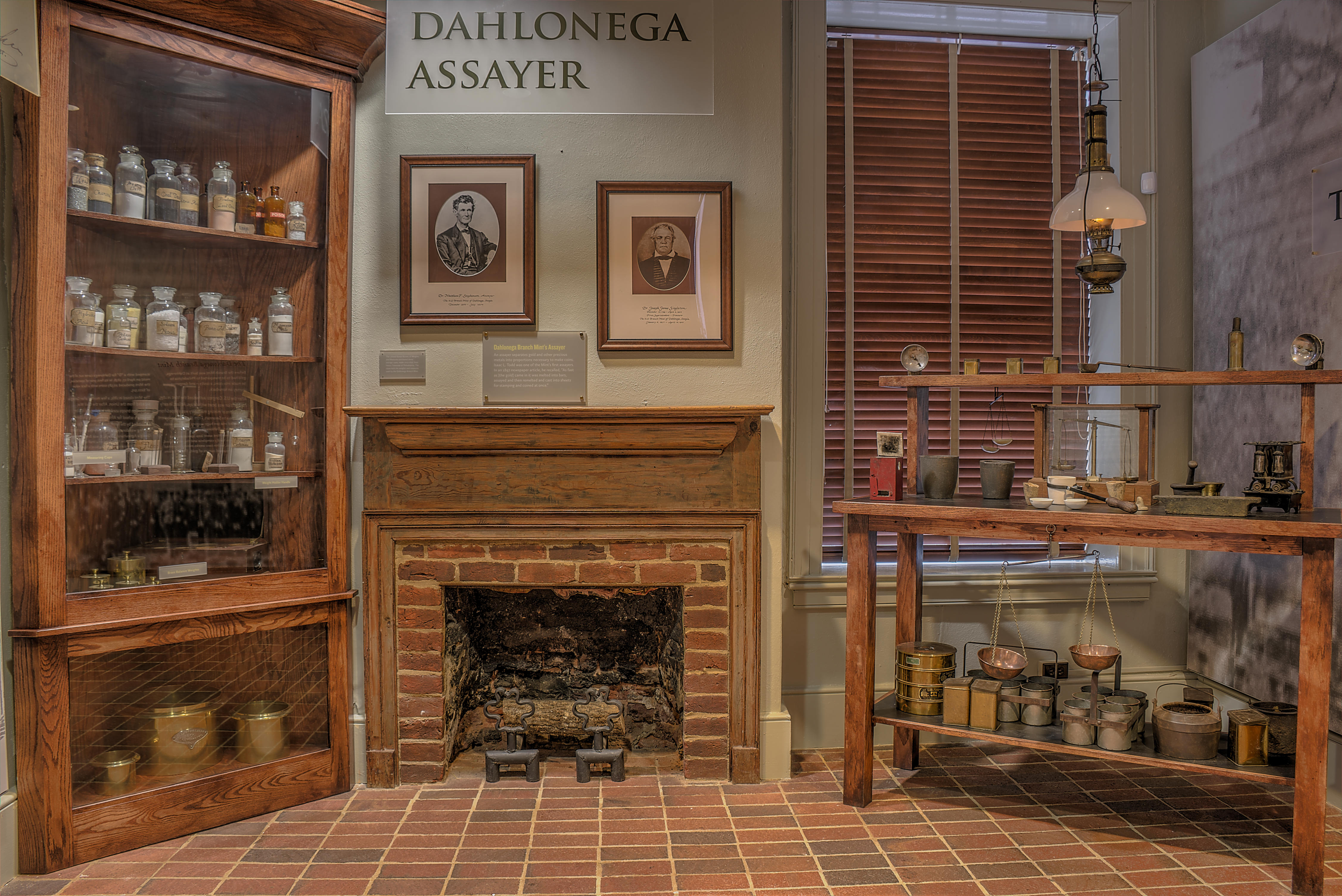
museum exhibit
