= Dahlonega, Georgia =

City in Georgia, United States

City of Dahlonega
- City
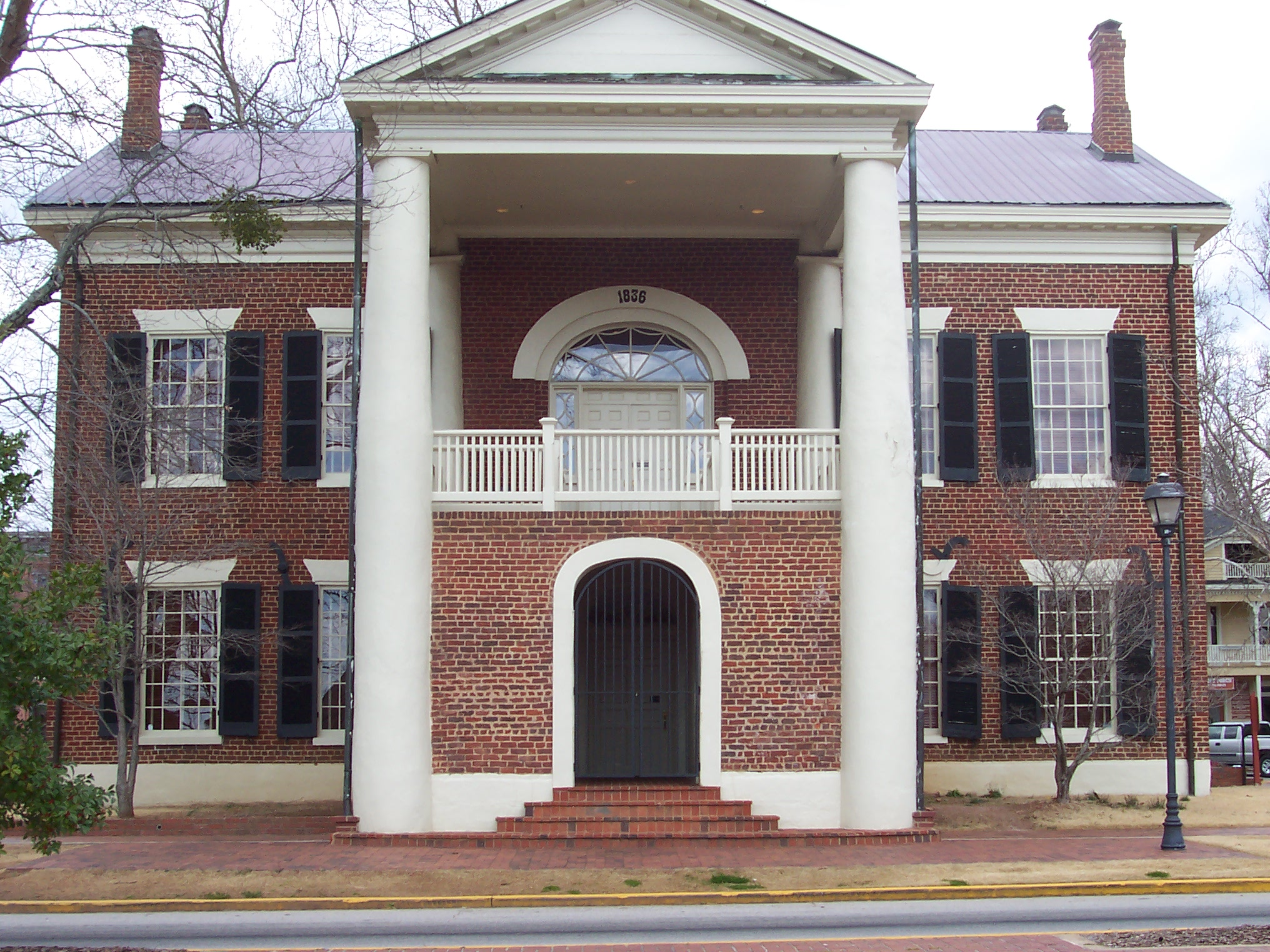
- Historic Lumpkin County Courthouse, which now houses the Dahlonega Gold Museum Historic Site

- Flag Seal Logo
- Nickname: Gold City
- Location in Lumpkin County and the state of Georgia
- Coordinates: 34°31′57″N 83°59′06″W
- Country: United States
- State: Georgia
- County: Lumpkin

Government
  - Type: Council–manager
  - Body: City Council
  - Mayor: Sam Norton
  - City Manager: Allison Martin
  - Chief of Police: George Albert

Area
  - Total: 8.87 sq mi (22.97 km^{2})
  - Land: 8.82 sq mi (22.84 km^{2})
  - Water: 0.054 sq mi (0.14 km^{2})
- Elevation: 1,450 ft (442 m)

Population (2020)
  - Total: 7,537
  - Density: 854.9/sq mi (330.06/km^{2})
- Time zone: UTC-5 (EST)
  - Summer (DST): UTC-4 (EDT)
- ZIP codes: 30533, 30597
- Area code: 706
- FIPS code: 13-21240
- GNIS feature ID: 0355420
- Website: dahlonega.gov

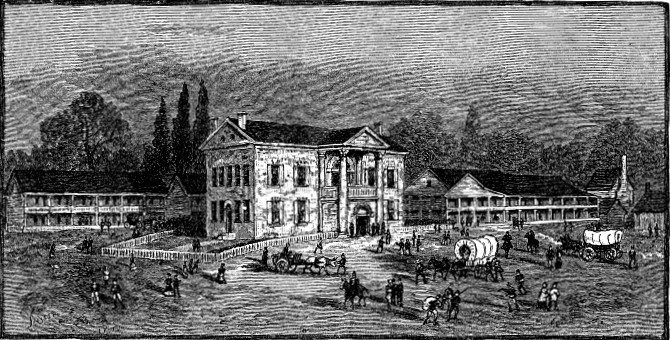
Dahlonega in 1879

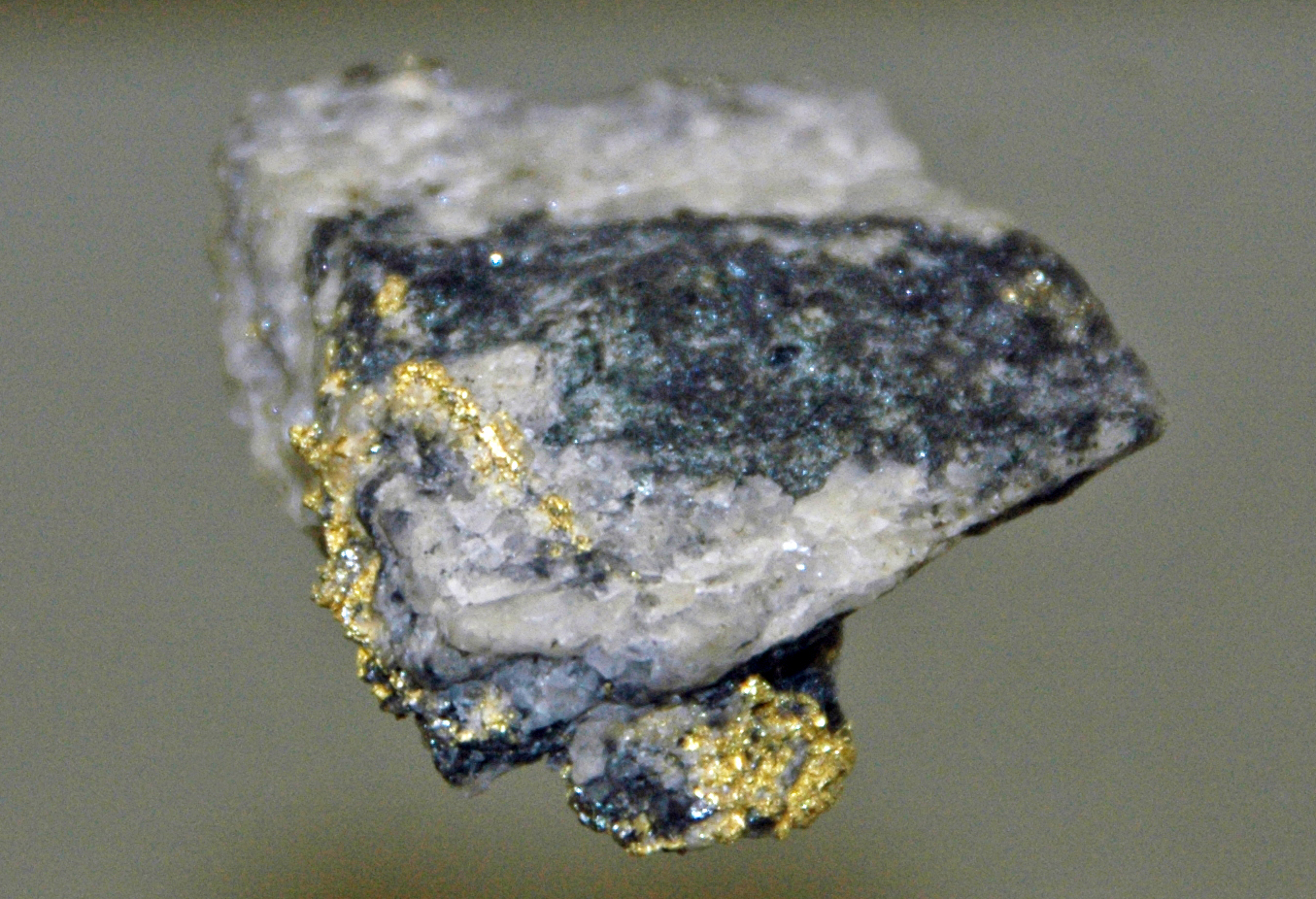
Gold-bornite-quartz vein specimen, Dahlonega Mining District

Dahlonega (/dəˈlɒnɪɡə/ də-LON-ig-ə) is the county seat of Lumpkin County, Georgia, United States. As of the 2020 census, Dahlonega had a population of 7,537.

Dahlonega is located at the north end of Georgia highway 400, a freeway which connects Dahlonega to Atlanta. The city is also a college town, home to the main campus of the University of North Georgia.

Dahlonega was the site of the second major Gold Rush in the United States beginning in 1829, the Georgia Gold Rush. The Dahlonega Gold Museum Historic Site which is located in the middle of the public square, was originally built in 1836 as the Lumpkin County Courthouse. In 1849, when local gold miners were considering heading west to join the California Gold Rush, Dr. Matthew Fleming Stephenson, the assayer at the Dahlonega Branch Mint, tried to persuade miners to stay in Dahlonega. Standing on the courthouse balcony and pointing at the distant Findley Ridge, Dr. Stephenson was recalled in his speech as saying: "Why go to California? In yonder hill lies more riches than anyone ever dreamed of. There's millions in it." This phrase was repeated by those miners who did make the journey to California and was shared in the mining camps of the west. Years later, the young Samuel Clemens, better known as the author Mark Twain, also heard of Stephenson's phrase. Twain was so enthralled by the phrase "There's Millions In It," that he used it frequently in his book The Gilded Age. Over time, the phrase has been misquoted to the better-known "Thar's gold in them thar hills."

== The Georgia Gold Rush ==
In 1829, the first documented discovery of gold was made in Georgia. As news of the discovery spread, thousands of would be get rich quick men flooded into the mountains looking for the yellow metal in the creeks and rivers. At that time in history, the frontier of Georgia bordered the Cherokee Nation. During the winter of 1829–1830, white gold prospectors began illegally crossing the Chestatee River into the Cherokee Nation in search of gold. After objections were made to the Federal Indian Agent in the territory, United States troops were sent in to forcibly remove the gold miners from the nation.

By 1831, Governor Gilmer (and later Wilson Lumpkin) of Georgia realized that it was impossible to remove the thousands of miners who had intruded into the Cherokee Nation. Gilmer saw an opportunity to claim the remaining Cherokee lands as part of Georgia. In 1832, the Georgia legislature voted to create ten new counties out of the former Cherokee Nation without regard to their sovereignty. Lumpkin County, named after Governor Wilson Lumpkin, was created in December 1832. A year later the town of Taloneka or Talonega was named as the new county seat on December 21, 1833. The spelling was later changed to Dahlonega, derived from the Cherokee word meaning "yellow."

The spelling of the Cherokee word Da-lo-ni-ge-i was disputed by early correspondents; Featherstonhough, for example, wrote it as "Tahlonekay". The proper pronunciation of Dahlonega is (Dah-loe-nee-gee or Dah-lone-gay) in the Western Dialect of the Cherokee language. Da-lo-ni-ge'i does not mean gold but it simply means, Yellow.

== Naming the city ==
Cherokee for Da-lo-ni-ge English phonetics: dah low knee gay

The city was named "Talonega" by the Georgia General Assembly on December 21, 1833. The name was changed from Talonega by the Georgia General Assembly on December 25, 1837, to "Dahlonega", from the Cherokee language word dalonige, meaning "yellow" or "gold".

== The Dahlonega Branch Mint ==
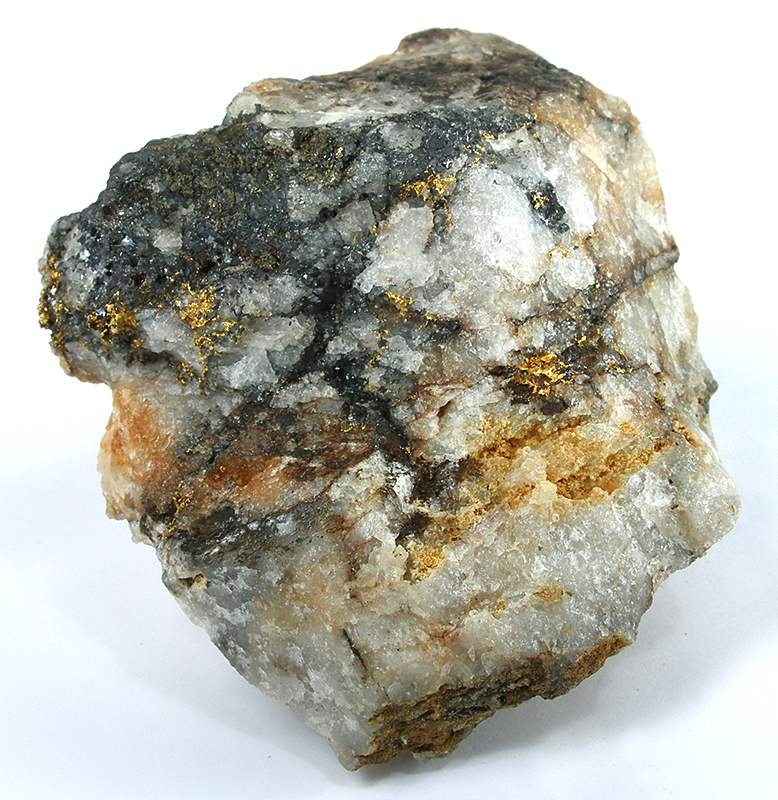
Historic specimen of high-grade gold ore from the Dahlonega mines

Due to the abundance of gold which was discovered in North Georgia, the United States Treasury Department decided to build a branch mint in Dahlonega. This allowed local miners a place to bring their gold deposits in exchange for hard currency. The Dahlonega branch mint was built in 1838 and operated from 1838 to 1861. The Dahlonega Mint, like the one also established in 1838 in Charlotte, North Carolina, minted only gold coins, in denominations of $1.00, $2.50 (quarter eagle), $3.00 (1854 only) and $5.00 (half eagle). It was cost-effective in consideration of the economics, time, and risk of shipping gold to the main mint in Philadelphia, Pennsylvania. The Dahlonega Mint was a small operation, usually accounting for only a small fraction of the gold coinage minted annually in the US.

In 1861, when the Civil War began, the mint closed due to lack of materials and manpower. After the war the U.S. government decided against re-opening the facility. By then, the U.S. government had established a mint in San Francisco. Given the large amount of gold discovered in California from the late 1840s on, the San Francisco and Philadelphia mints handled the national needs of coin minting. As a result, surviving Dahlonega coinage is today highly prized in American numismatics.

The University of North Georgia

After the end of the Civil War in 1865, the Dahlonega Branch mint remained closed. The building served as a barracks for US troops garrisoned here, and as a school for freed black students. In 1871, Hon. William P. Price, who had been elected to Congress from Dahlonega, petitioned the government to re-purpose the vacant mint building into a college. In 1873, the newly founded North Georgia Agricultural College, opened its doors from the ashes of the original Dahlonega Branch Mint. Over the years as the college grew, the names have changed from the original North Georgia Agricultural College, North Georgia College, North Georgia College and State University and the current designation as the University of North Georgia.

== Wine and tourism ==
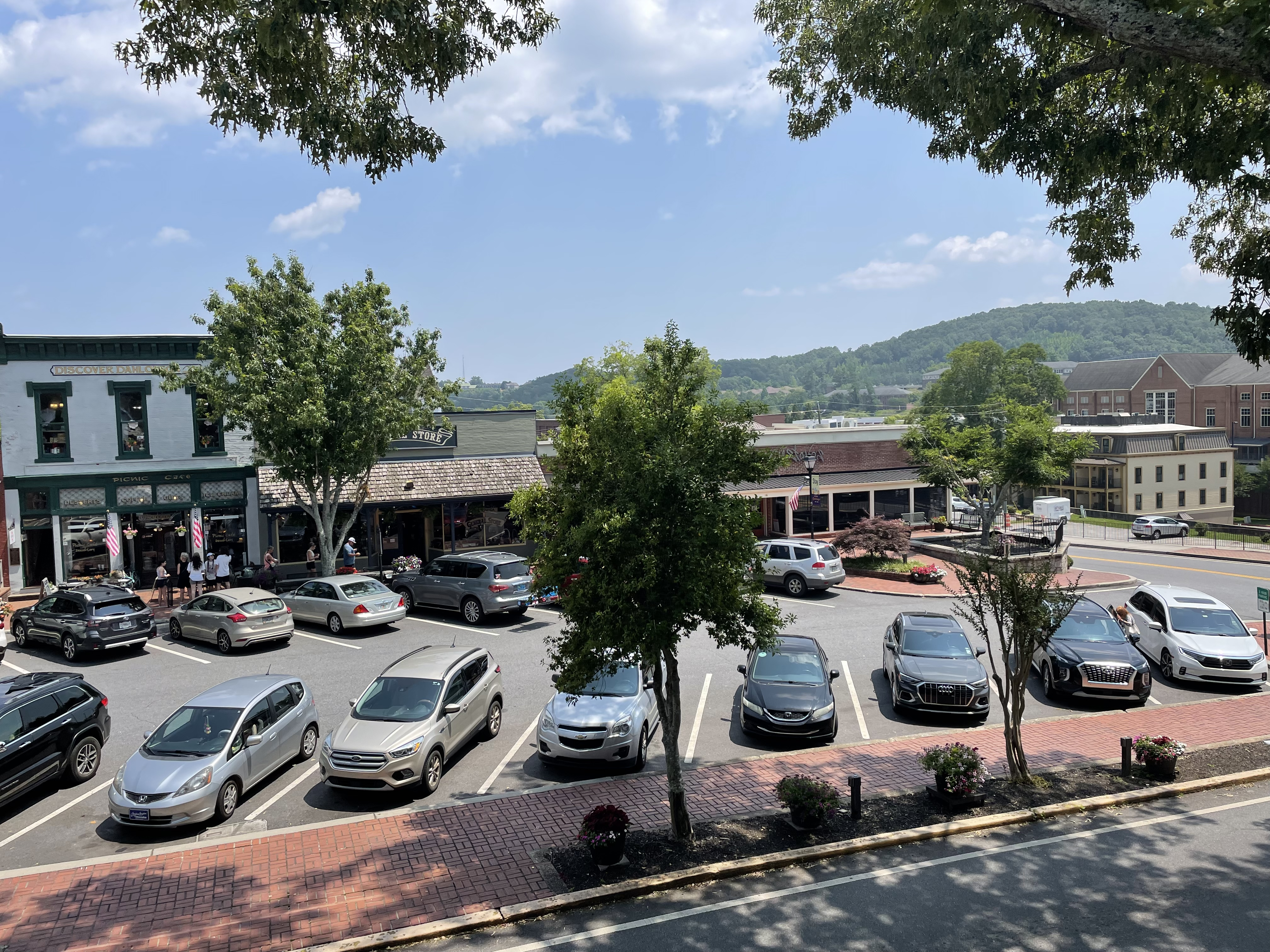
A view of the Dahlonega Square as seen from the Dahlonega Gold Museum Historic Site

In recent years, Dahlonega and Lumpkin County have been recognized as "the heart of the North Georgia Wine Country". The county features multiple vineyards and five licensed wineries that attract many tourists.

The historic Dahlonega Square is a popular destination, with gift shops, restaurants, art galleries and studios, and wine-tasting rooms. In 2015, Senator Steve Gooch introduced Georgia Senate Resolution 125 officially recognizing Lumpkin County as the Wine Tasting Room Capital of Georgia.

The city's local festivals draw many visitors. "Bear on the Square", an annual three-day festival held the third weekend in April, marks the day that a black bear wandered onto the square. It features bluegrass and old-time music. "Gold Rush Days", an annual two-day event the third weekend in October, attracts over 200,000 people.

Dahlonega is home to the Holly Theatre.

Dockery Lake Recreation Area is located 12 miles North of Dahlonega, a US Forest Service campground on a man-made lake stocked with trout.

== Historical marker ==
Located at 384 Mountain Drive, WPA Historical Marker 19 B-7 explains:

This court house, built in 1836, replaced the small structure used since the establishment of Lumpkin County in 1832. The town was named Dahlonega in October, 1833, for the Cherokee word Talonega meaning "golden."

From its steps in 1849, Dr. M.F. Stephenson, assayer at the Mint, attempted to dissuade Georgia miners from leaving to join the California Gold Rush. His oration gave rise to the sayings: "There's millions in it," and "Thar's gold in them thar hills."

== Geography ==
Dahlonega is located in central Lumpkin County at 34°31′57″N 83°59′06″W (34.5325, −83.9850). U.S. Route 19 passes through the east side of the city, leading north 34 mi (55 km) to Blairsville and south 65 mi (105 km) to Atlanta. Georgia State Route 400, a freeway which runs concurrently with US-19 to Atlanta, has its northern terminus 5 mi (8 km) south of the center of Dahlonega. State Routes 9 and 52 run concurrently around the south side of Dahlonega, joining US 19 on the southeast side. State Route 9 leads southwest 14 mi (23 km) to Dawsonville, while State Route 52 leads west 18 mi (29 km) to Amicalola Falls State Park. To the east State Route 52 leads 16 mi (26 km) to Clermont.

According to the United States Census Bureau, the city has a total area of 8.8 sq mi (22.9 km^{2}), of which 0.05 sq mi (0.14 km^{2}), or 0.60%, are water. The city is centered on a low ridge, with the west side draining to Cane Creek and the east side to Yahoola Creek. Both creeks flow south to the Chestatee River, part of the Chattahoochee River watershed. 1,720 ft (520 m) Crown Mountain is in the southern part of the city.

== Demographics ==
Historical population
Census	Pop.	Note	%±
1840	671		—
1850	735		9.5%
1870	471		—
1880	602		27.8%
1890	896		48.8%
1900	1,255		40.1%
1910	829		−33.9%
1920	690		−16.8%
1930	905		31.2%
1940	1,294		43.0%
1950	2,152		66.3%
1960	2,604		21.0%
1970	2,658		2.1%
1980	2,844		7.0%
1990	3,086		8.5%
2000	3,638		17.9%
2010	5,242		44.1%
2020	7,537		43.8%
U.S. Decennial Census

=== 2020 census ===
As of the 2020 census, Dahlonega had a population of 7,537. The median age was 21.1 years. 7.0% of residents were under the age of 18 and 13.3% of residents were 65 years of age or older. For every 100 females there were 89.4 males, and for every 100 females age 18 and over there were 88.5 males age 18 and over.

78.7% of residents lived in urban areas, while 21.3% lived in rural areas.

There were 1,651 households in Dahlonega, of which 18.2% had children under the age of 18 living in them. Of all households, 40.8% were married-couple households, 19.6% were households with a male householder and no spouse or partner present, and 35.1% were households with a female householder and no spouse or partner present. About 30.1% of all households were made up of individuals and 13.1% had someone living alone who was 65 years of age or older.

As of the 2020 census, there were 1,086 families residing in the city.

There were 1,871 housing units, of which 11.8% were vacant. The homeowner vacancy rate was 1.0% and the rental vacancy rate was 9.6%.

Dahlonega racial composition as of 2020
Race	Num.	Perc.
White (non-Hispanic)	6,227	82.62%
Black or African American (non-Hispanic)	245	3.25%
Native American	19	0.25%
Asian	133	1.76%
Pacific Islander	10	0.13%
Other/mixed	320	4.25%
Hispanic or Latino	583	7.74%

== Education ==
=== Lumpkin County School District ===
The Lumpkin County School District holds pre-school to grade twelve, and consists of three elementary schools, a middle school, and a high school. The district has 215 full-time teachers and over 3,511 students.

- Cottrell Elementary School
- Long Branch Elementary School
- Blackburn Elementary School
- Lumpkin County Middle School
- Lumpkin County High School

=== Higher education ===
Dahlonega is home to University of North Georgia (formerly named North Georgia College and State University), North Georgia College and North Georgia Agricultural College, the Senior Military College of Georgia and the second oldest public university in the State of Georgia. The University of North Georgia is one of six senior military colleges (along with the Public Campuses of Texas A&M University, The Citadel, the Virginia Military Institute and Virginia Tech, and the Private Campus of Norwich University). The campus' administration building, Price Memorial Hall, is topped with a spire covered with gold leaf from the town. The rotunda dome of the Georgia State Capitol in Atlanta is also covered with Dahlonega gold.

=== Other educational facilities ===
- Wahsega 4-H Center, an environmental education center and summer camp owned by the University of Georgia and administered through the UGA Cooperative Extension Service Georgia 4-H program
- Camp Glisson, a year-round retreat camp owned by the North Georgia Conference of the United Methodist Church

== Notable people ==
- Cleo S. Cason, military librarian at Redstone Arsenal
- Sara Christian, NASCAR's first female driver
- Steve Gooch, Georgia state senator and majority leader
- Dallas Kinney, Pulitzer Prize-winning photographer
- Guy A. J. LaBoa, lieutenant general in the United States Army who commanded the 4th Infantry Division and First United States Army
- 6 Dogs, Rapper popular in the underground "Cloud Rap" movement

== International relations ==
=== Twin towns – sister cities ===
Dahlonega is twinned with:

- Myślenice, Poland
