= Long Branch (Chestatee River tributary) =

Stream in Georgia, U.S.

Coordinates: 34°31′14″N 83°54′54″W

Long Branch is a stream in Georgia, USA, and is a tributary of the Chestatee River. The creek is approximately 4.88 miles (7.85 km) long.

== Course ==
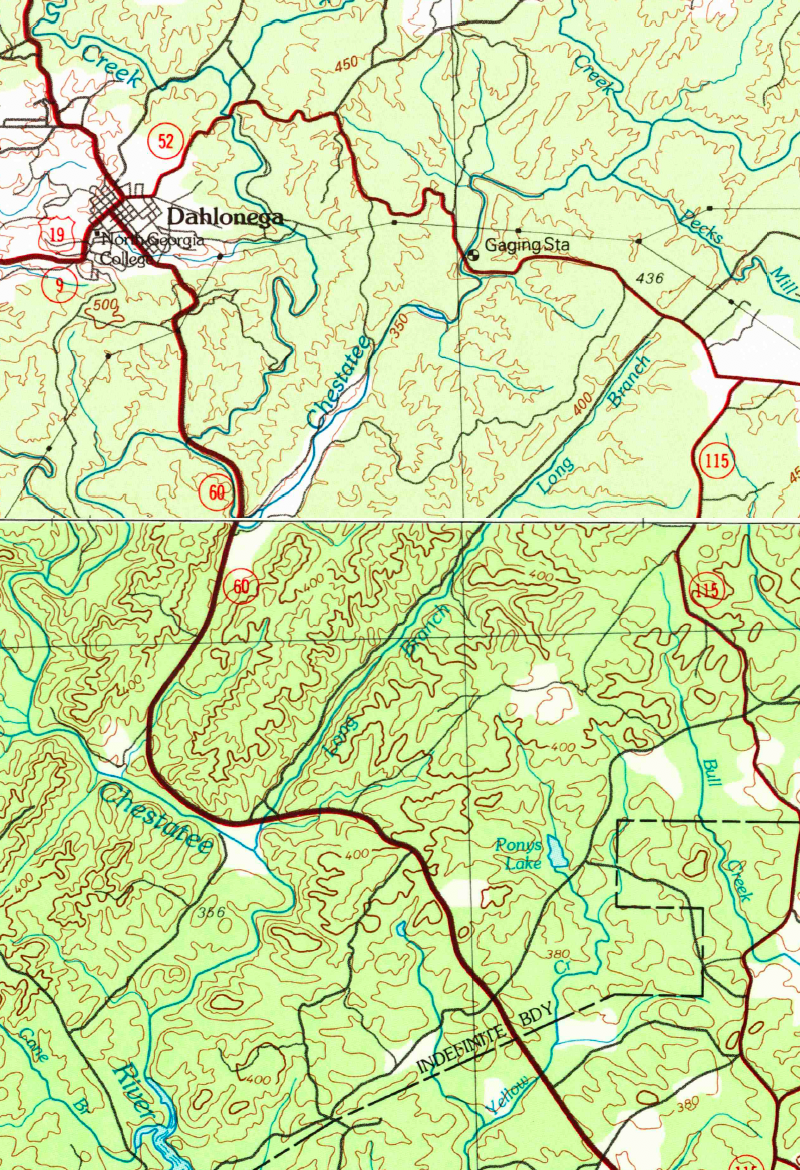
Topographic map showing Long Branch and the Chestatee River in the south

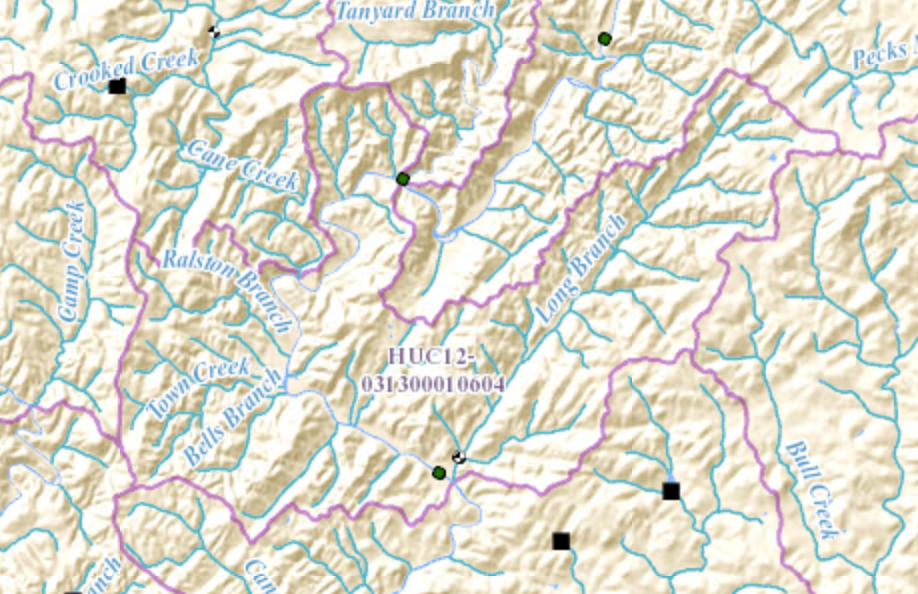
Map showing Long Branch and its sub-watershed (outlined in pink), and the Chestatee River

Long Branch rises in southeastern Lumpkin County, just south of the intersection of State Route 52 and State Route 115, east of Dahlonega. The creek heads southwest in an almost completely straight line parallel to and immediately adjacent to State Route 115, which is named Long Branch Road from its crossing with the Chestatee River to its terminus at U.S. Route 19. Long Branch picks up two unnamed branches from the east on its way to the Chestatee, and joins the river at the intersection of U.S. Route 19/State Route 60/State Route 115 south of Dahlonega, where US 19/SR 60 curve to the west to head to Dahlonega, and SR 155/Long Branch Road heads northeast.

== Sub-watershed details ==
The creek watershed and associated waters is designated by the United States Geological Survey as sub-watershed HUC 031300010604, is named the Long Branch-Chestatee River sub-watershed, and drains an area of approximately 15 square miles southeast and south of Dahlonega. The sub-watershed has an unusual shape in the form of the capital letter U, with the right arm of the U being formed by Long Branch, and the left arm being formed by the Chestatee River south of its confluence with Yahoola Creek. The Chestatee also receives the waters of Cane Creek, Ralston Branch, Town Creek (not to be confused with Town Creek, the much longer tributary to the Chestatee River), and Bells Branch, along with 6 unnamed branches, before it departs the sub-watershed at its confluence with Long Creek.

== See also ==
- Water Resource Region
- South Atlantic-Gulf Water Resource Region
- Apalachicola basin
