= Dicks Creek =

Dicks Creek may refer to the following:

In Georgia:

- Dicks Creek (Tallulah River), a tributary of the Tallulah River in Rabun County
- Dicks Creek (Chattooga River), a tributary of the Chattooga River in Rabun County
- Dicks Creek (Chestatee River), a tributary of the Chestatee River in Lumpkin County

In Ohio:

- Dicks Creek (Great Miami River), a tributary of the Great Miami River in Butler and Warren counties, Ohio
