= Latham Creek (Chestatee River tributary) =

Stream in Georgia, U.S.

Coordinates: 34°23′02″N 83°55′35″W

Latham Creek is a stream in Georgia, and is a tributary of the Chestatee River. The creek is approximately 3.02 miles (4.86 km) long.

== Course ==
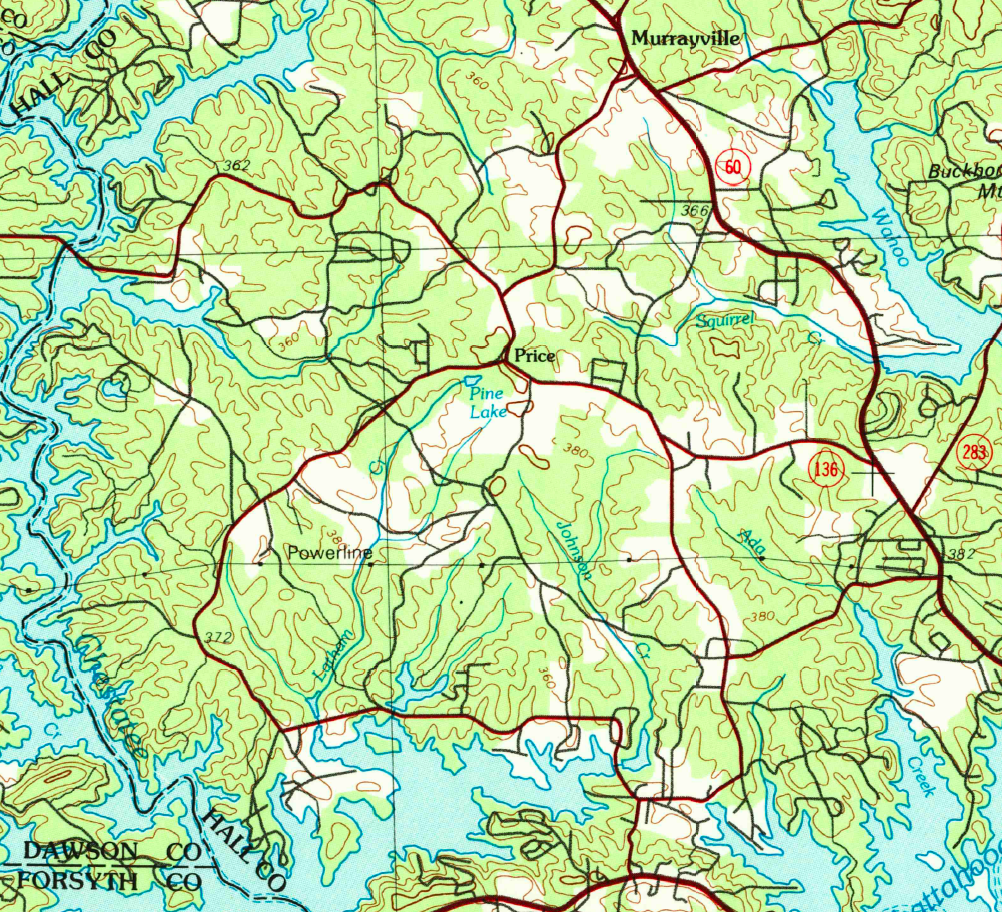
Topographic map showing Latham Creek and the Chestatee River arm of Lake Lanier in the south

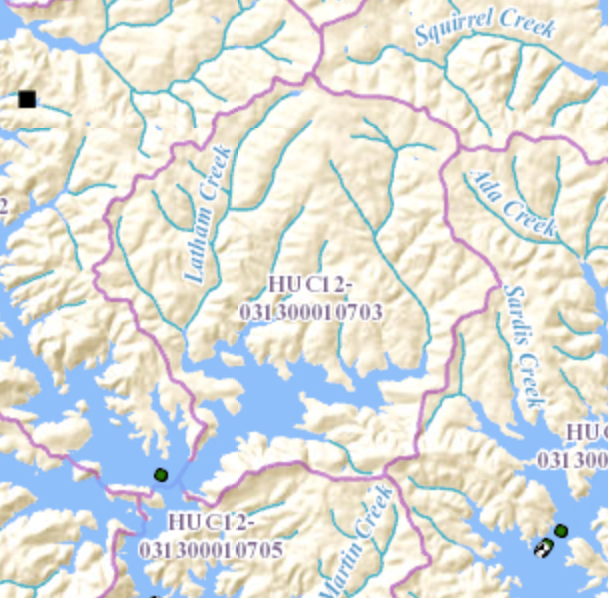
Map showing Latham Creek and its sub-watershed (outlined in pink), and the Chestatee River arm of Lake Lanier

Latham Creek rises as it flows out of Pine Lake in western Hall County, just southwest of the intersection of State Route 136 and Cool Springs Road, and just south of the community of Price. The creek heads southwest, then south for approximately 1.4 miles, then picks up an unnamed branch that rises just east of Latham Creek, before continuing southeast and meeting another unnamed branch from the northwest. The creek flows into and forms the Latham Creek arm of Lake Lanier just east of the Chestatee River arm of the lake, into which it merges at its meeting point with the Thompson Creek sub-watershed. The Latham Creek arm also receives two additional unnamed branches coming from the north and east, respectively, before Latham Creek meets the Chestatee River, which is submerged under Lake Lanier at the point of their confluence at the intersection of the Chestatee and Latham Lake Lanier arms just west of State Route 53.

== Sub-watershed details ==
The creek watershed and associated waters is designated by the United States Geological Survey as sub-watershed HUC 031300010703, is named the Latham Creek sub-watershed, and drains an area of approximately 11 square miles halfway between Dawsonville to the northwest and Gainesville to the southeast. The sub-watershed drains the western portion of the area between the Chestatee River arm and the Wahoo Creek-Little River arm of Lake Lanier at the northwestern part of the lake, north of State Route 53.

== See also ==
- Water Resource Region
- South Atlantic-Gulf Water Resource Region
- Apalachicola basin
