= Taylor Creek (Chestatee River tributary) =

Stream in Georgia, U.S.

Coordinates: 34°18′15″N 84°02′00″W

Taylor Creek is a stream in Georgia, and is a tributary of the Chestatee River. The creek is approximately 3.66 miles (5.89 km) long.

== Course ==
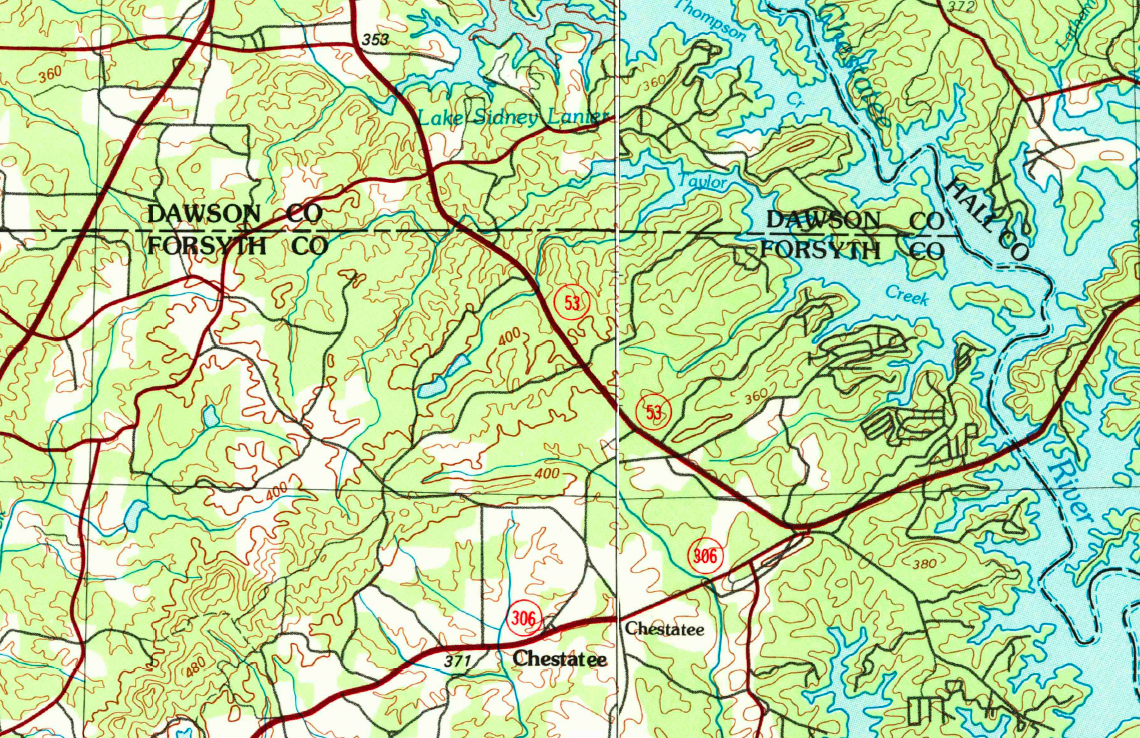
Topographic map showing Taylor Creek and the Chestatee River arm of Lake Lanier in the south

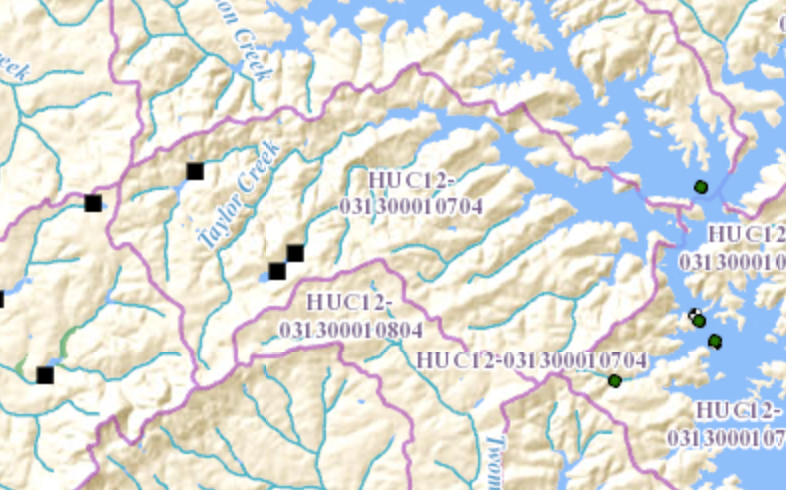
Map showing Taylor Creek and its sub-watershed (outlined in pink), and the Chestatee River arm of Lake Lanier

Taylor Creek rises in northeastern Forsyth County, in the middle of a triangle formed by U.S. Route 19/State Route 400 to the west, State Route 53 to the north and east, and State Route 306 to the south, and northwest of the community of Chestatee. The area is also the location of the headwaters of 3 other major creeks (namely, clockwise from the west, Settingdown Creek, Twomile Creek, and Fourmile Creek), and is the meeting point of 4 sub-watersheds.

The creek heads north, then northeast, for approximately 1.6 miles, then picks up an unnamed branch from the west just before crossing State Route 53, right at the border between Forsyth County and Hall County. Taylor Creek curves very briefly back into Forsyth County, then reenters Hall County, heading east-northeast, and flows into and forms the Taylor Creek arm of Lake Lanier just west of the Chestatee River arm of the lake, into which it merges at its meeting point with the Thompson Creek sub-watershed. The Taylor Creek arm also receives three additional unnamed branches coming from the south and west, before Taylor Creek meets the Chestatee River, which is submerged under Lake Lanier at the point of their confluence at the intersection of the Chestatee and Taylor Lake Lanier arms just north of State Route 53, and opposite of the entry of the Latham Creek arm into the Chestatee River arm of the lake.

== Sub-watershed details ==
The creek watershed and associated waters is designated by the United States Geological Survey as sub-watershed HUC 031300010704, is named the Taylor Creek sub-watershed, and drains an area of approximately 10 square miles west of Gainesville and just north of Chestatee. The sub-watershed drains the area south of the Thompson Creek sub-watershed and west of the southern portion of the submerged Chestatee River.

== See also ==
- Water Resource Region
- South Atlantic-Gulf Water Resource Region
- Apalachicola basin
