= Dicks Creek (Chestatee River tributary) =

Stream in Georgia, USA

Coordinates: 34°43′46″N 83°57′19″W

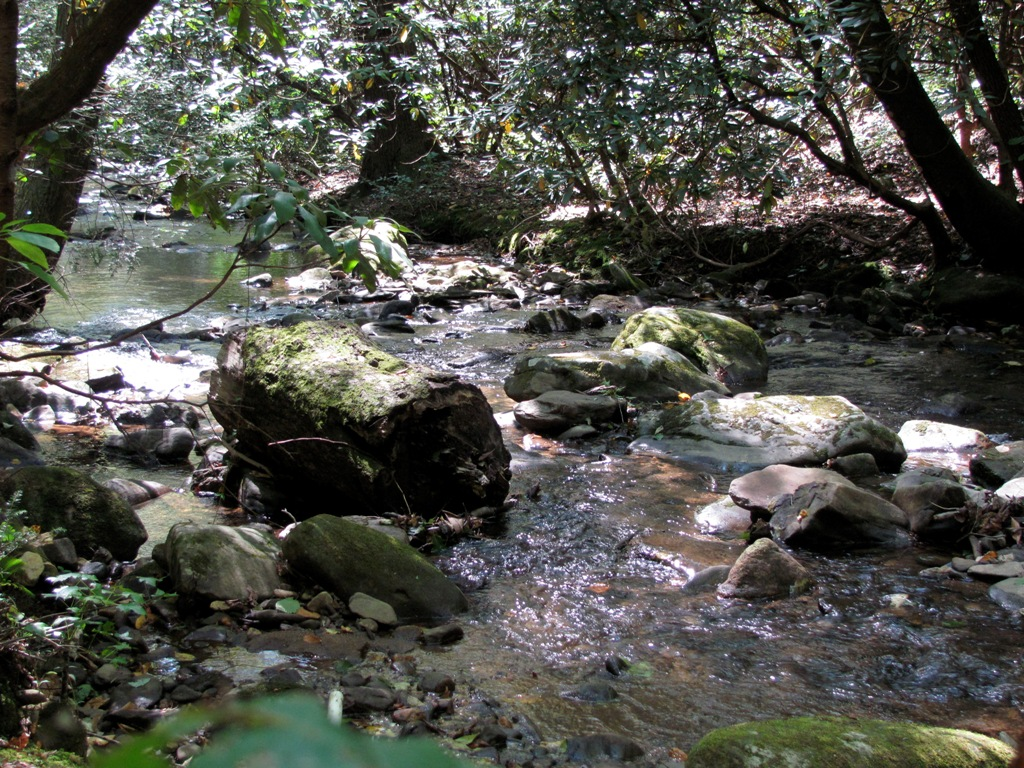
Frogtown Creek, a tributary to the Chestatee River in Lumpkin County, Georgia

Dicks Creek is a stream in Georgia, and is a tributary of the Chestatee River. The creek is approximately 7.37 miles (11.86 km) long.

== Course ==
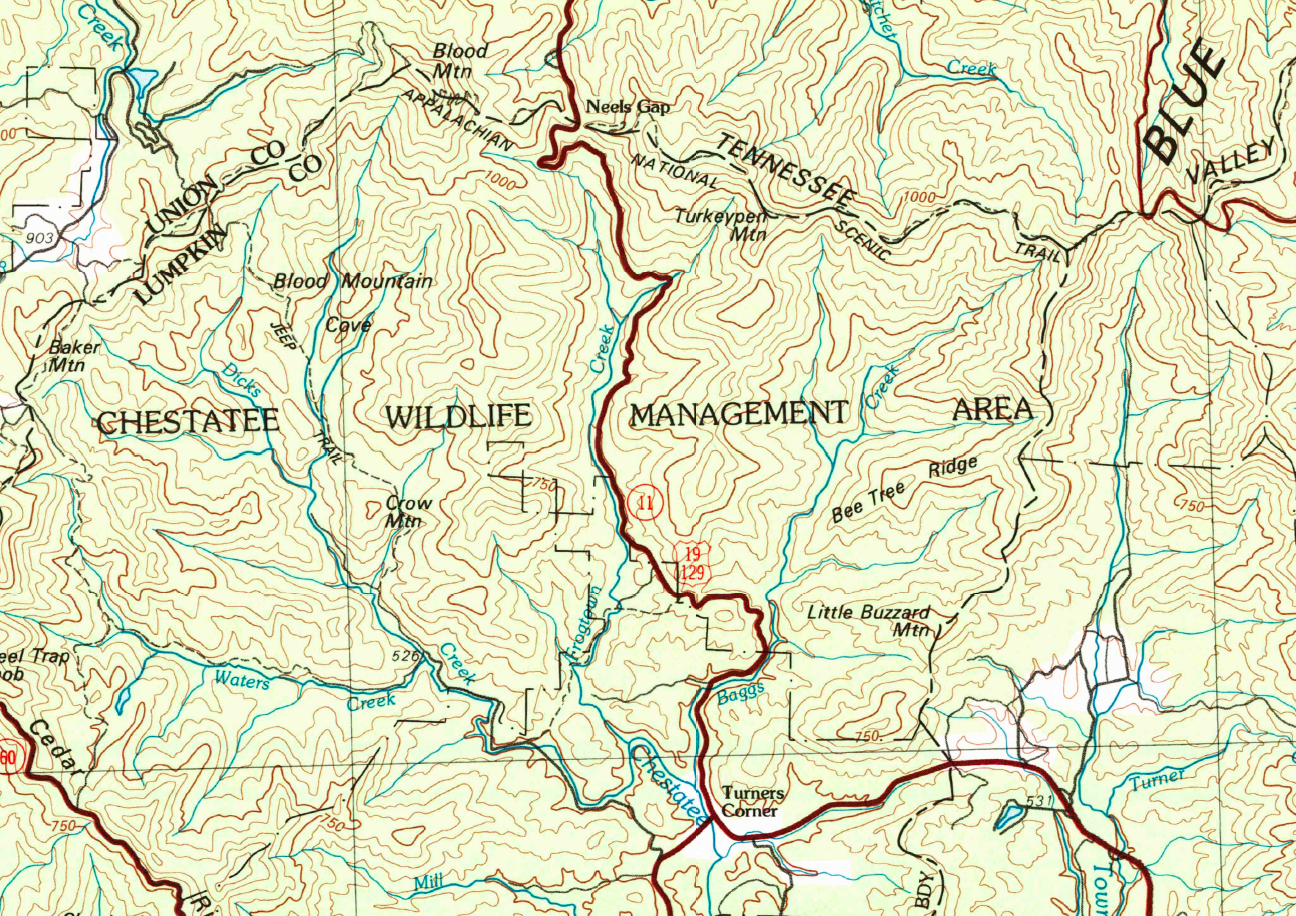
Topographic map showing Dicks Creek and the Chestatee River

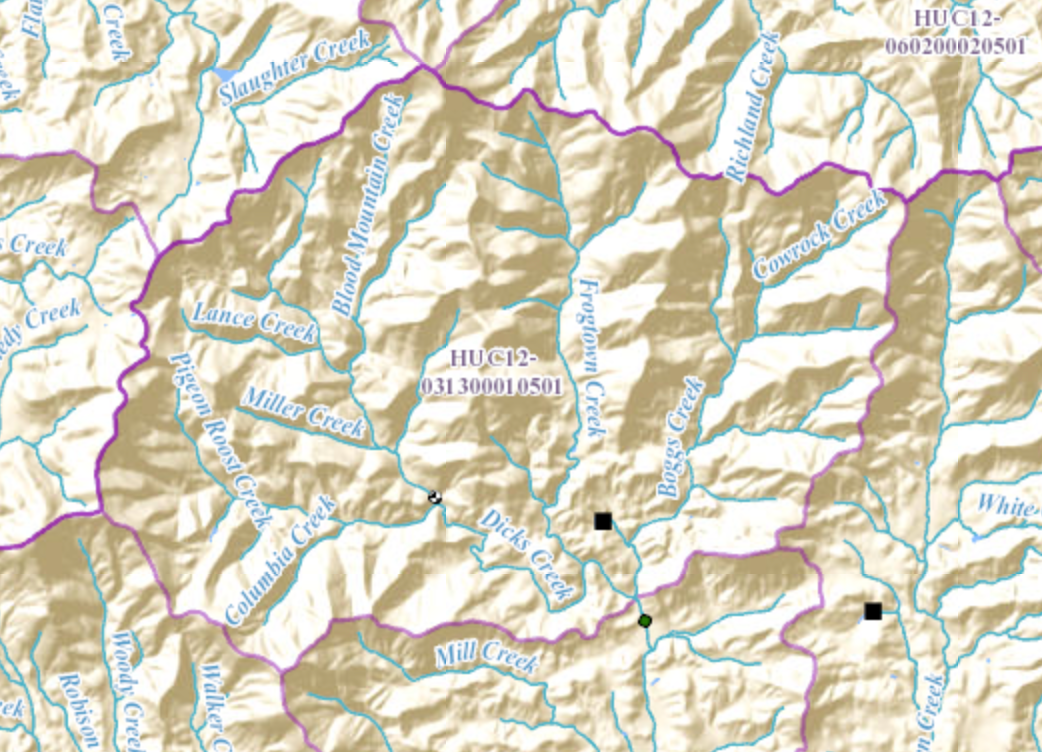
Map showing Dicks Creek and its sub-watershed (outlined in pink), and the Chestatee River

Dicks Creek rises in the Blood Mountain Wilderness, just southwest of Blood Mountain, in the confines of the Chattahoochee-Oconee National Forest in Lumpkin County in Georgia. The creek heads in a southerly direction away from Blood Mountain for approximately 2.3 miles, and picks up Lance Creek from the west, just before its confluence with Blood Mountain Creek, which has paralleled Dicks Creek from the foot of Blood Mountain on the east. Dicks Creek picks up Miller Creek from the west after another 0.8 miles, then turns to the southeast and picks up Waters Creek, also from the west, before heading east for 2.8 miles and meeting Frogtown Creek, where the Chestatee River begins at the confluence of the two creeks very close to the intersection of State Route 9 and U.S. Route 129 at Turners Corner. A portion of Dicks Creek is on the Appalachian Trail.

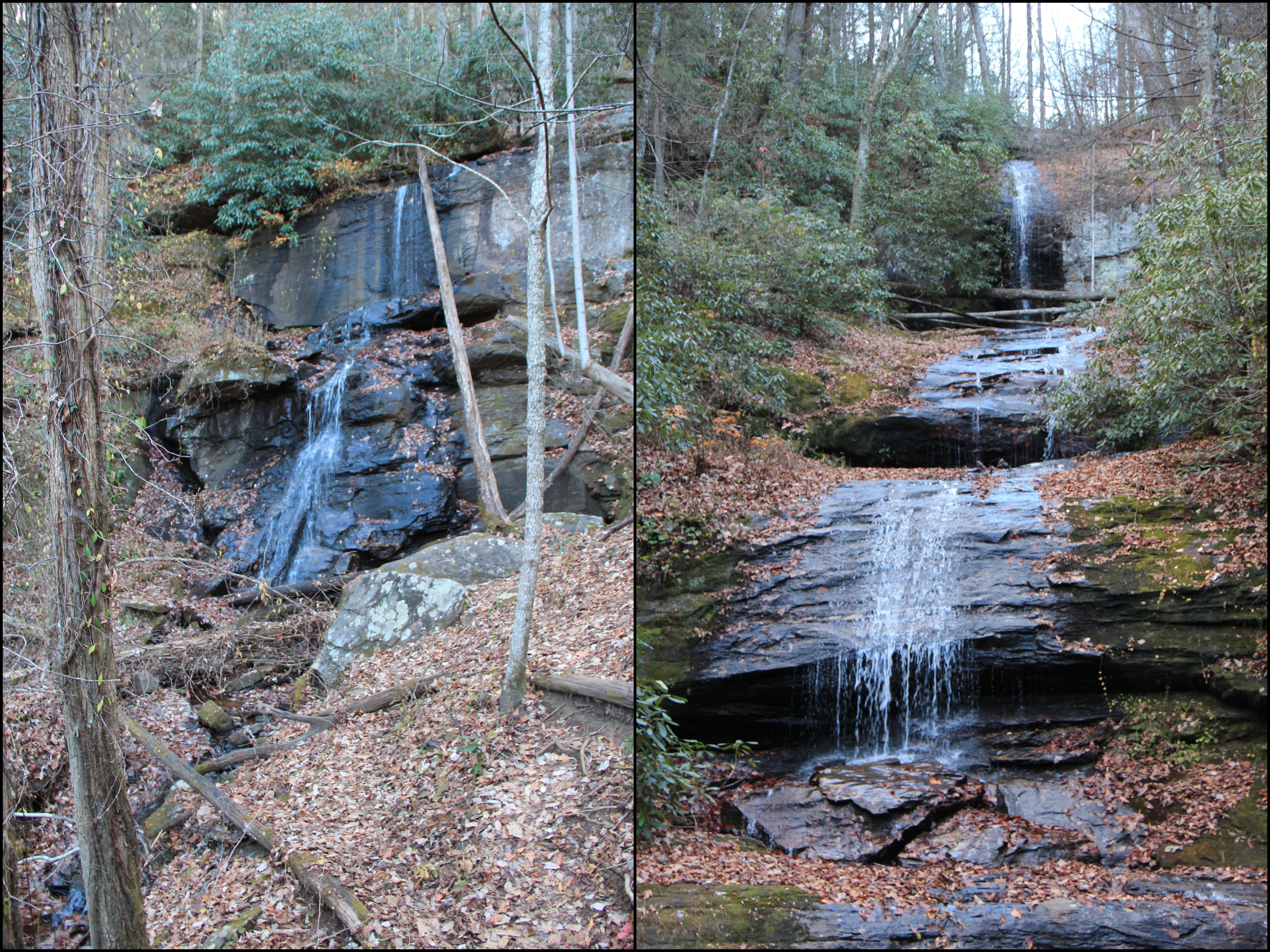
DeSoto Falls on Frogtown Creek

Frogtown Creek rises east of Dicks Creek and Blood Mountain Creek, and to the southeast of Blood Mountain, and parallels Dicks Creek to the west, while running alongside U.S. Route 19 to the east, before its confluence with Dicks Creek. Frogtown Creek features DeSoto Falls in the Desoto Falls Scenic Area.

== Sub-watershed details ==
The creek watershed and associated waters is designated by the United States Geological Survey as sub-watershed HUC 031300010501, is named the Dicks Creek sub-watershed, and drains an area of approximately 32 square miles east of Suches, and north of the Chestatee River.

== See also ==
- Water Resource Region
- South Atlantic-Gulf Water Resource Region
- Apalachicola basin
