= Cavenders Creek =

Stream in Georgia, U.S.

Coordinates: 34°34′49″N 83°55′34″W

Cavenders Creek is a stream in Georgia, and is a tributary of the Chestatee River. The creek is approximately 3.43 miles (5.52 km) long.

== Course ==
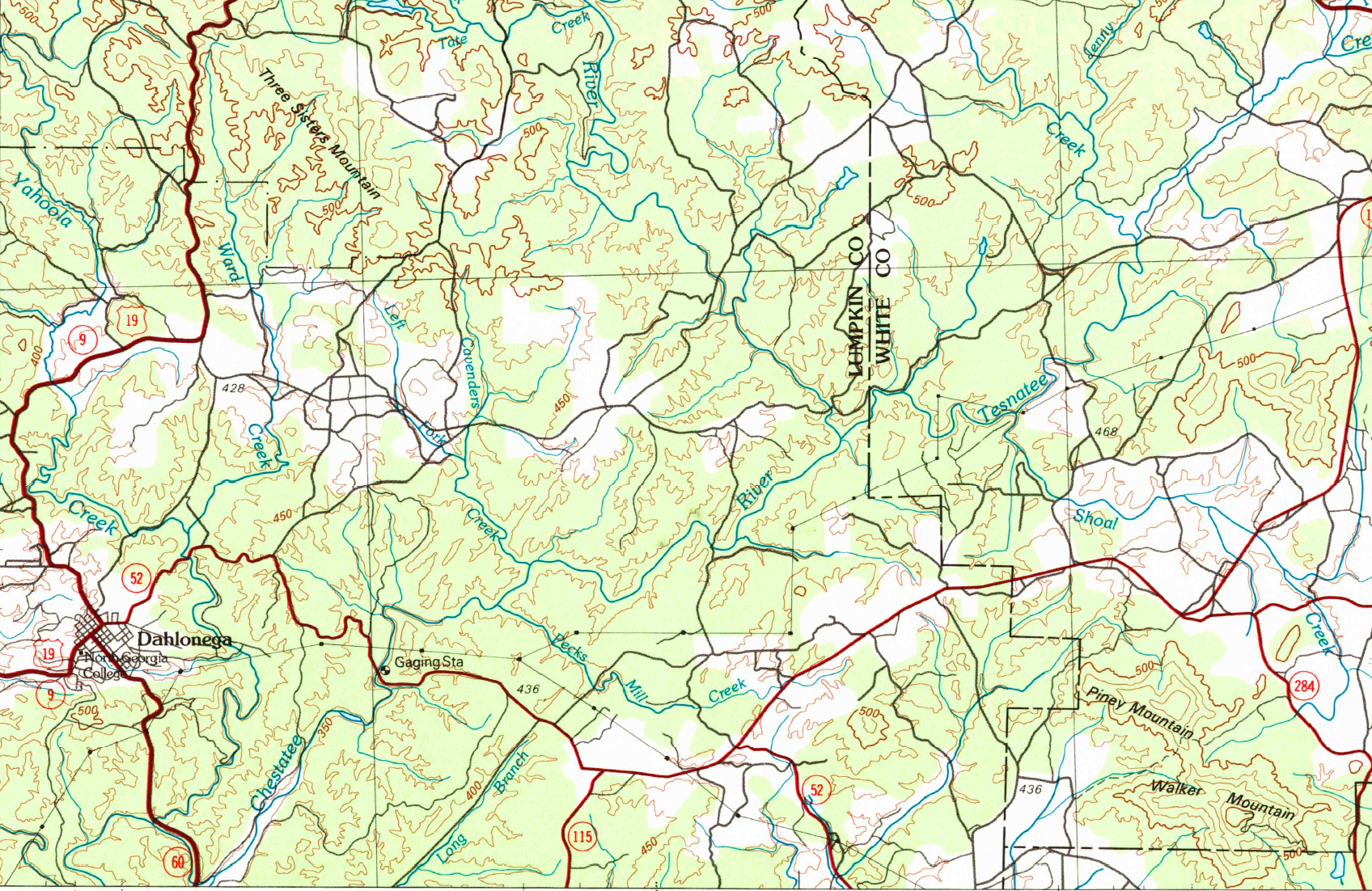
Topographic map showing Cavenders Creek and the Chestatee River

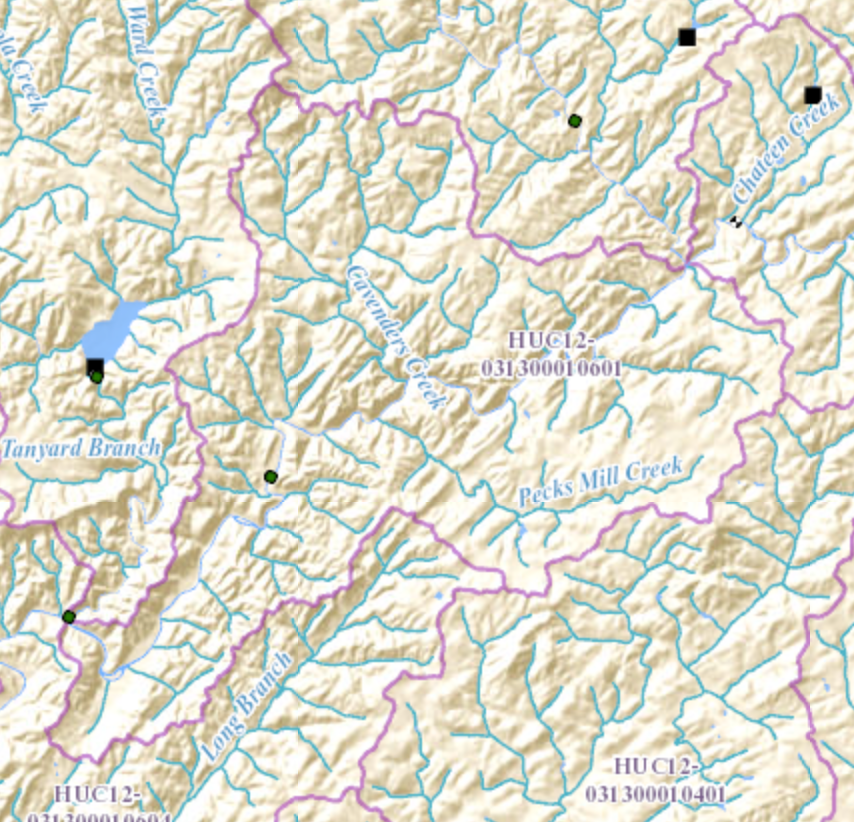
Map showing Cavenders Creek and its sub-watershed (outlined in pink), and the Chestatee River

Cavenders Creek rises in east-central Lumpkin County, approximately 2 miles southeast of Tate Creek, west of U.S. Route 19/State Route 9/State Route 60, and just south of the Chattahoochee-Oconee National Forest. The creek heads south for approximately 1.9 miles, parallel to the highway, and picks up two unnamed branches from the east, before joining with Left Fork Cavenders Creek. The creek then heads southeast for 1.4 miles, and joins the Chestatee River north of State Route 52.

== Sub-watershed details ==
The creek watershed and associated waters is designated by the United States Geological Survey as sub-watershed HUC 031300010601, is named the Cavenders Creek-Chestatee River sub-watershed, drains an area of approximately 21 square miles northeast of Dahlonega, and is bisected by the Chestatee River heading from the northeast to the southwest through the sub-basin. The sub-watershed south of Cavenders Creek and the Chestatee River drains the portion of eastern Lumpkin County east of Dahlonega. From north to south, 5 unnamed branches, as well as Pecks Mill Creek, which is 4.29 miles (6.90 km) long, join the Chestatee from the south, while Cavenders Creek and 3 other unnamed branches flow into the river from the north.

== See also ==
- Water Resource Region
- South Atlantic-Gulf Water Resource Region
- Apalachicola basin
