= Cane Creek (Chestatee River tributary) =

Stream in Georgia

Coordinates: 34°38′25″N 84°02′32″W

Cane Creek is a stream in Georgia, and is a tributary of the Chestatee River. The creek is approximately 14.72 miles (23.69 km) long.

== Course ==
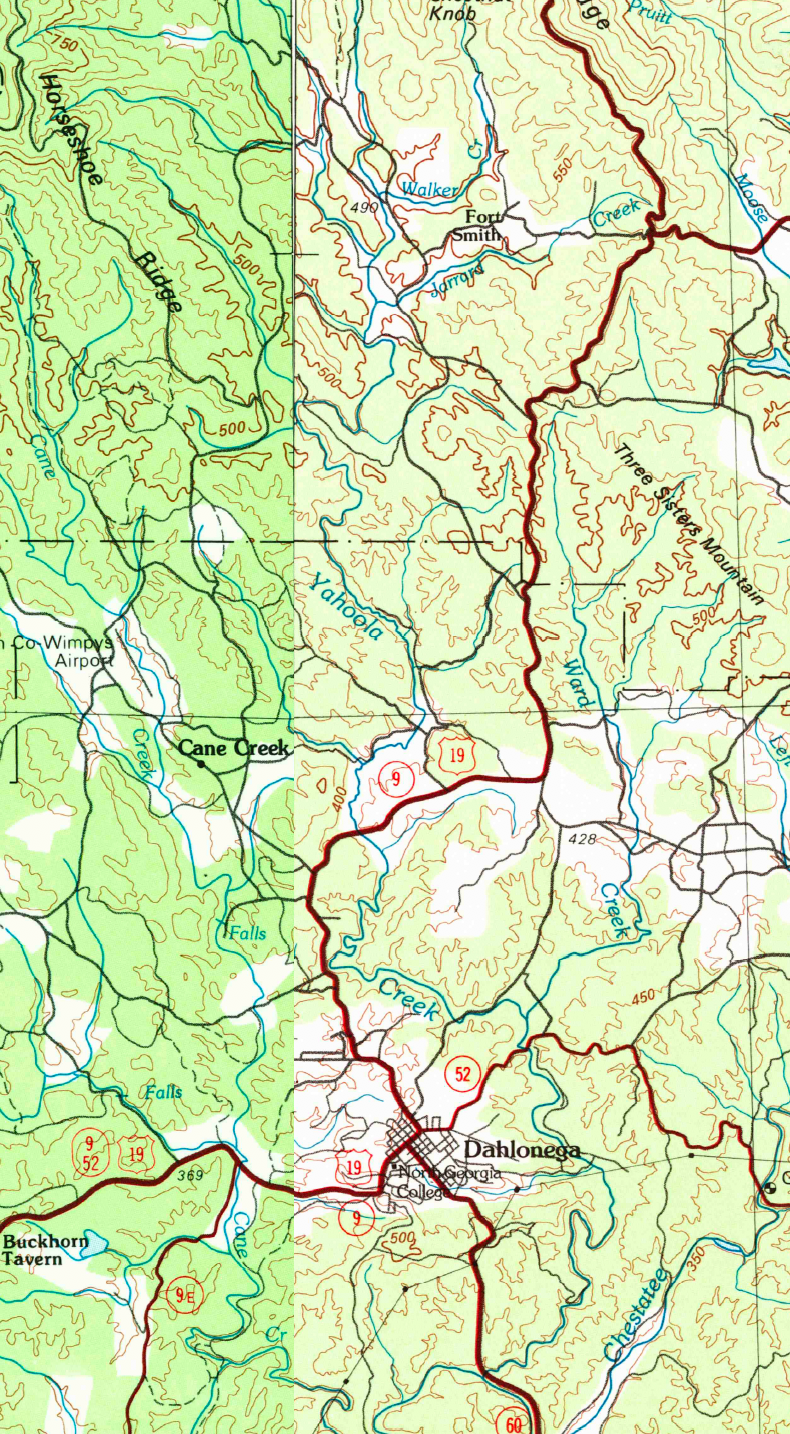
Topographic map showing Cane Creek in the western portion of the map, and the Chestatee River in the south

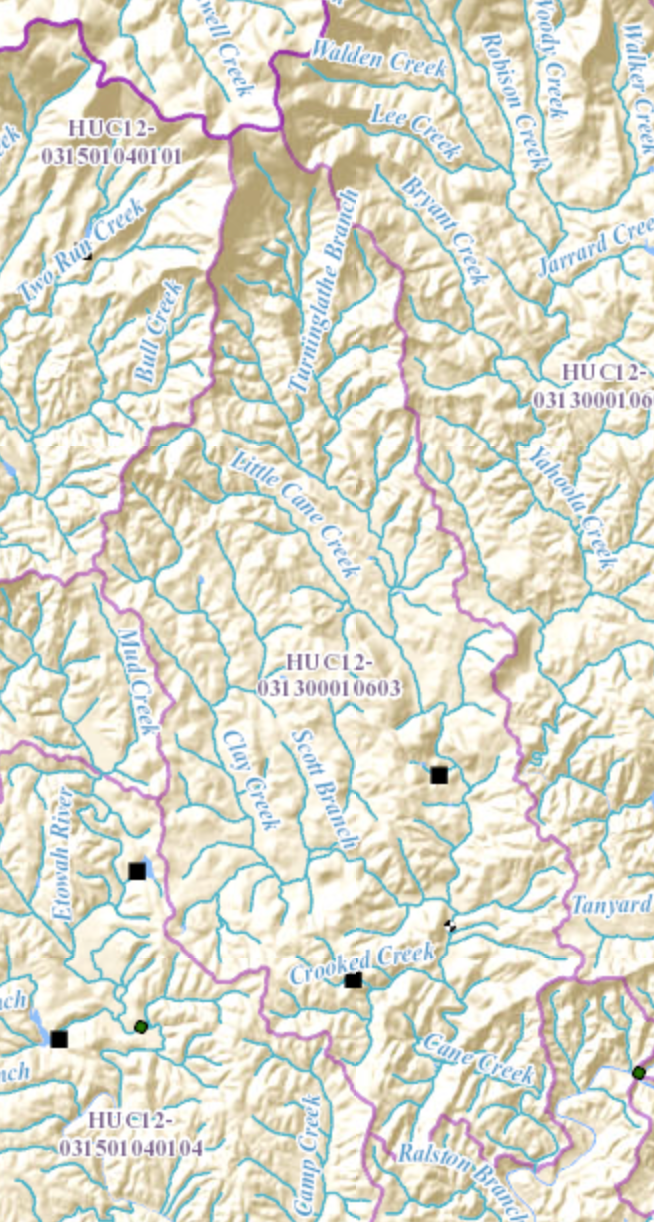
Map showing Cane Creek and its sub-watersheds (outlined in pink), and the Chestatee River

Cane Creek rises in north-central Lumpkin County, less than 2 miles west of the source of Yahoola Creek, and approximately halfway between Suches to the northeast and Dahlonega to the southeast, in the southern portion of the Chattahoochee-Oconee National Forest. The creek heads south for approximately 3.7 miles, and picks up an unnamed branch first from the west, then from the east, before being joined by West Cane Creek from the west, then continues south for just under 2 additional miles before its confluence with Little Cane Creek, again from the west, in the eponymous unincorporated community of Cane Creek. Approximately 1.4 miles further on, Cane Creek picks up an unnamed branch from the north and forms Cane Creek Falls in Camp Glisson, then continues south for another 2 miles before crossing State Route 9/State Route 52 just west of Dahlonega, where it is also joined by Clay Creek. Crooked Creek joins Cane Creek from the west less than a mile further on, then the creek meanders south for approximately 4.4 miles, picks up two more unnamed branches, and joins the Chestatee River just west of U.S. Route 19/State Route 60 southwest of Dahlonega.

== Sub-watershed details ==
The creek watershed and associated waters is designated by the United States Geological Survey as sub-watershed HUC 031300010603, is named the Cane Creek sub-watershed, and drains an area of approximately 27 square miles north of Dahlonega. Clay Creek, which is 7.29 miles (11.73 km) long, and which joins Cane Creek at State Route 9/State Route 52, drains a significant portion of the west of the sub-watershed before joining Cane Creek, and picks up Peggy Branch and Scott Branch, as well as two unnamed branches, along the way.

== See also ==
- Water Resource Region
- South Atlantic-Gulf Water Resource Region
- Apalachicola basin
