= Thompson Creek (Chestatee River tributary) =

Stream in Georgia, U.S.

Coordinates: 34°21′57″N 84°02′30″W

Thompson Creek is a stream in Georgia, and is a tributary of the Chestatee River. The creek is approximately 1.86 miles (2.99 km) long.

== Course ==
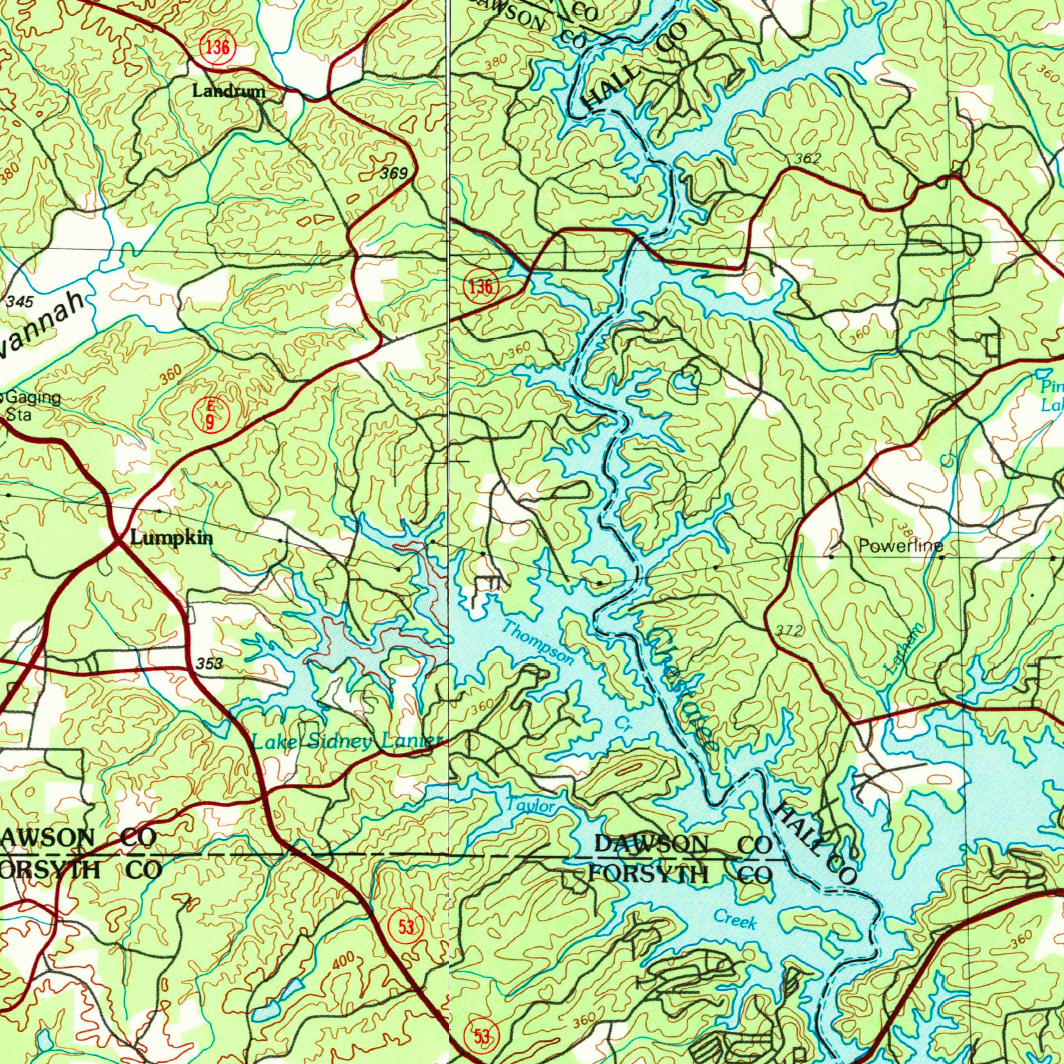
Topographic map showing Thompson Creek and the Chestatee River arm of Lake Lanier in the south

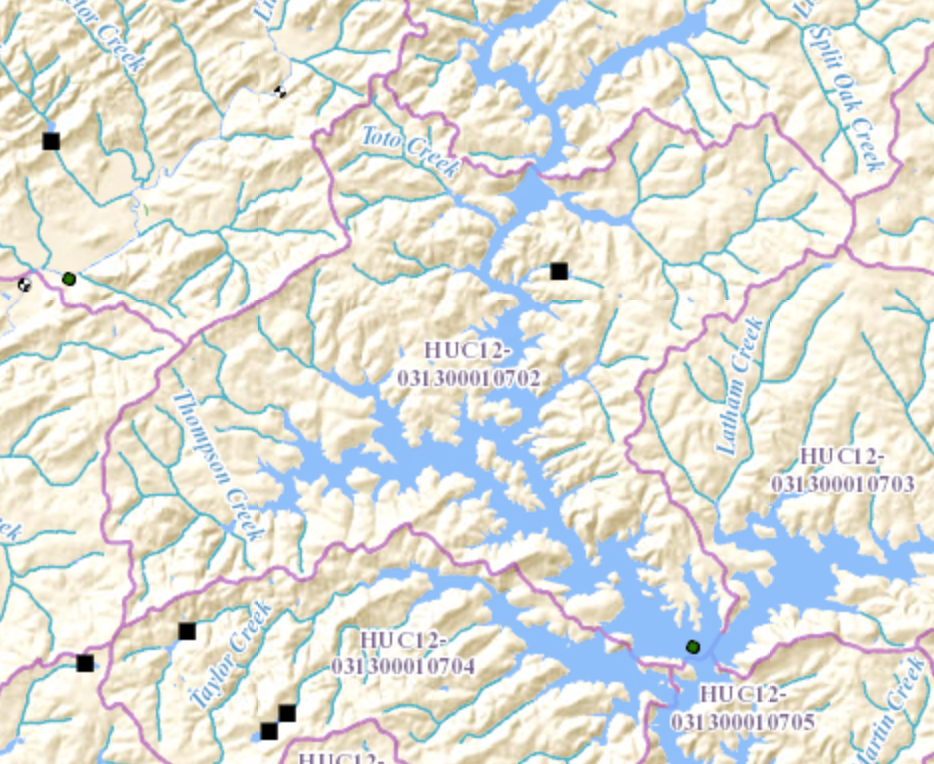
Map showing Thompson Creek and its sub-watershed (outlined in pink), and the Chestatee River arm of Lake Lanier

Thompson Creek rises in eastern Dawson County, just west of U.S. Route 19/State Route 400 and just north of State Route 53, and southeast of Dawsonville. The creek heads southeast for less than a half a mile, then crosses US 19/SR 400 and heads south along the highway, before turning east and forming the Thompson Creek arm of Lake Lanier, which is the westernmost arm of the lake, just east of SR 400. This arm also receives one additional unnamed branch coming from the south, before Thompson Creek meets the Chestatee River, which is submerged under Lake Lanier at the point of their confluence at the intersection of the Chestatee and Thompson Lake Lanier arms.

== Sub-watershed details ==
The creek watershed and associated waters is designated by the United States Geological Survey as sub-watershed HUC 031300010702, is named the Thompson Creek-Chestatee River sub-watershed, and drains an area of approximately 23 square miles southeast of Dawsonville. The sub-watershed also encompasses a significant southern portion of the Chestatee River arm of Lake Lanier at the border of Dawson County and Hall County to a point just north of State Route 53 and Keith Bridge, and dips into Forsyth County at its southern end. The Chestatee River enters the sub-watershed immediately south of the Yellow Creek sub-watershed, and drains and picks up an unnamed branch from the east, as well as Toto Creek and two other unnamed branches from the west.

== See also ==
- Water Resource Region
- South Atlantic-Gulf Water Resource Region
- Apalachicola basin
