= Taylor Creek =

Taylor Creek or Taylors Creek may refer to:

== Watercourses ==
In United States

- Taylor Creek (Lake Tahoe), California
- Taylor Creek (Florida), a tributary of Lake Okeechobee
- Taylor Creek (Ohio River), Kentucky
- Taylors Creek, Kentucky
- Taylor Creek (Duck River), Tennessee
- Taylor Creek (Seattle), Washington
- Taylor Creek (Chestatee River), Georgia

Elsewhere

- Taylor-Massey Creek (Don), Toronto, Ontario, Canada
- Taylor Creek (Ottawa), a tributary of the Ottawa River

== Communities ==
- Taylor Creek, Florida, United States
- Taylor Creek, Ohio (Hamilton County), United States
- Taylor Creek Township, Hardin County, Ohio, United States

== Other ==
- Taylor Creek Wilderness, Utah, United States
