= Shaker Creek =

Shaker Creek may refer to:

- Shaker Creek (Kentucky)
- Shaker Creek (Ohio)

== See also ==
- Shakers Creek, a stream in New York
