= Chestatee River =

River in Georgia, United States

Coordinates: 34°31′41″N 83°56′23″W

The Chestatee River (variant spellings Chestatie, Chestetee, Chostatee, Chosteta, Chestotee; none in modern use) is a 32.76-mile-long (52.72 km) river in the Appalachian Mountains of northern Georgia, US.

The word "Chestatee" is a Cherokee word meaning roughly "pine torch place" or "place of lights", because they would use bonfires along the riverbanks to light their torches. They would then use these torches for hunting deer and other wild game in the forest. The Chestatee Regional Library System takes its name from the river, as do Chestatee High School and Middle School in Gainesville. In a nod to the origins of the name, CHS strives to be "a place of light" to their students.

== Course ==
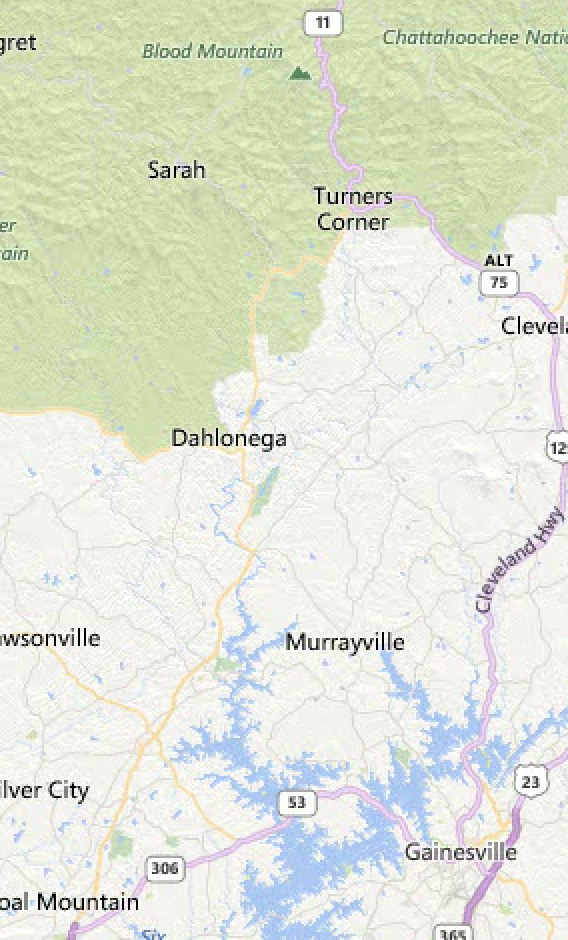
Map showing the Chestatee River area, with its source near Blood Mountain, running south near Turners Corner and through Dahlonega, and flowing into Lake Lanier at the southern part of the map

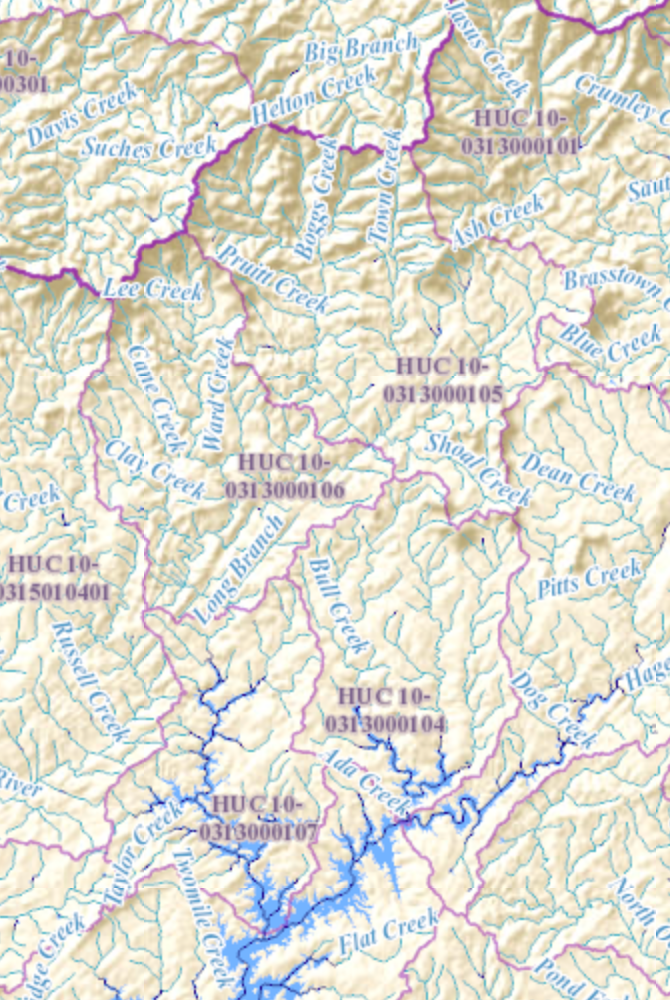
Map showing the 3 Chestatee River watersheds (0313000105 to 07)

It begins at the confluence of Dicks Creek and Frogtown Creek (near the junction of U.S. 19 and U.S. 129) in northeastern Lumpkin County, flowing down by the county seat and former Georgia Gold Rush town of Dahlonega, and then under the northern terminus of the Georgia 400 expressway from Atlanta. It originally continued past the southern corner of the county, forming the entire eastern border of southern Dawson County with northwestern Hall County, and the far northern part of Forsyth's border with Hall. The river was used as a defining line in the Cherokee Treaty of Washington 1819 and the eastern border of the Hickory Log District of the Cherokee Nation before removal

It is a major tributary of the Chattahoochee River, into which it ended at a point now under the waters of Lake Lanier, since Buford Dam was finished in 1956. The northwestern arm of the lake, which flooded the lower 18 miles (29 km) of the river, is called Chestatee Bay, which destroyed the town of Chestatee (called Atsunsta Ti Yi by the native Cherokee people) when it was submerged. The county boundaries still follow the original thalwegs of the river, with the lake coming as far up the river as Lumpkin's southernmost tip. At this point, the river forms an extremely small portion of the Lumpkin/Hall county line for about 1 mile (1.6 km).

=== Watershed and sub-watershed details ===
The Chestatee River basin area consists of three HUC-10 watersheds, namely 0313000105, 0313000106, and 0313000107, and 14 sub-watersheds, listed below.

HUC-10 0313000105

Sub-watershed HUC	Sub-watershed Name	Sub-Basin Description	Sub-watershed Location	Sub-watershed Size (mi^{2})	Sub-Basin Map
031300010501	Dicks Creek	Dicks Creek and its tributaries and branches, namely Frogtown Creek, Boggs Creek, Cowrock Creek, Columbia Creek, Pigeon Roost Creek, Miller Creek, Lance Creek, and Blood Mountain Creek.	Located entirely in Lumpkin County.	32	HUC031300010501
031300010502	Upper Tesnatee Creek	Upper Tesnatee Creek and its tributaries and branches, namely Cathey Creek, Tom White Branch, Ledford Branch, Turner Creek, Thurmond Creek, and Cox Creek.	Located entirely in White County.	28	HUC031300010502
031300010503	Town Creek	Town Creek and its tributaries and branches, namely White Creek, Jenny Creek, and Glade Branch.	Located entirely in White County.	26	HUC031300010503
031300010504	Lower Tesnatee Creek	Lower Tesnatee Creek and its tributaries and branches, namely Chateen Creek and Shoal Creek.	Located in White County and Lumpkin County.	18	HUC031300010504
031300010505	Tate Creek-Chestatee River	Tate Creek and its tributaries and branches, namely Moose Creek, Pruitt Creek, and Mill Creek.	Located entirely in Lumpkin County.	31	HUC031300010505

HUC-10 0313000106

Sub-watershed HUC	Sub-watershed Name	Sub-Basin Description	Sub-watershed Location	Sub-watershed Size (mi^{2})	Sub-Basin Map
031300010601	Cavenders Creek	Cavenders Creek and its tributaries and branches, namely Pecks Mill Creek.	Located entirely in Lumpkin County.	21	HUC031300010601
031300010602	Yahoola Creek	Yahoola Creek and its tributaries and branches, namely Bryant Creek, Lee Creek, Walden Creek, Robison Creek, Woody Creek, Walker Creek, Jarrard Creek, Ward Creek, and Tanyard Branch.	Located entirely in Lumpkin County.	34	HUC031300010602
031300010603	Cane Creek	Cane Creek and its tributaries and branches, namely Crooked Creek, Clay Creek, Scott Branch, Little Cane Creek, and Turninglathe Branch.	Located entirely in Lumpkin County.	27	HUC031300010603
031300010604	Long Branch	Long Branch and its tributaries and branches, namely Ralston Branch, Town Creek, and Bells Branch.	Located entirely in Lumpkin County.	15	HUC031300010604

HUC-10 0313000107

Sub-watershed HUC	Sub-watershed Name	Sub-Basin Description	Sub-watershed Location	Sub-watershed Size (mi^{2})	Sub-Basin Map
031300010701	Yellow Creek	Yellow Creek and its tributaries and branches, namely Little Yellow Creek, Split Oak Creek, and Cane Branch.	Located in Lumpkin County and Hall County.	21	HUC031300010701
031300010702	Thompson Creek	Thompson Creek and its tributaries and branches, namely Toto Creek.	Located in Dawson County and Hall County.	23	HUC031300010702
031300010703	Latham Creek	Latham Creek and its tributaries and branches.	Located entirely in Hall County.	11	HUC031300010703
031300010704	Taylor Creek	Taylor Creek and its tributaries and branches.	Located in Dawson County and Forsyth County.	10	HUC031300010704
031300010705	Martin Creek	Martin Creek and its tributaries and branches.	Located in Hall County and Forsyth County.	8	HUC031300010705

== Hydrology ==
There is one stream gauge (NWS location identifier DGAG) along the river, installed in 1907 at State Route 52 near Dahlonega. It is at latitude 34°31'41"N, longitude 83°56'23"W, at 1,128.6 feet (344.0 m) above mean sea level. The watershed area above this point is 153 square miles (400 km^{2}). The National Weather Service has set a flood stage for this gauge of 19 feet (5.8 m). The highest level ever recorded was in 1967, at 25.17 feet (7.67 m) on August 23. This is about ten times its average height or depth.

== See also ==
- Water resource region
- South Atlantic–Gulf water resource region
- Apalachicola basin
