= Yellow Creek (Chestatee River tributary) =

Stream in Georgia, US

Coordinates: 34°28′53″N 83°56′11″W

Location
- Country: United States
- State: Georgia
- Counties: Lumpkin, Hall, Dawson

Physical characteristics
- Source
  - location: Southern Lumpkin County
- Mouth: Chestatee River (via Lake Lanier)
- Length: 5.66 miles (9.1 km)
- Basin size: 27 square miles (70 km^{2})

Basin features
- Tributaries
  - left: Little Yellow Creek
- Waterbodies: Pony's Lake, Lake Lanier

Yellow Creek is a stream in Georgia, and is a tributary of the Chestatee River. The creek is approximately 5.66 miles (9.11 km) long.

== Course ==
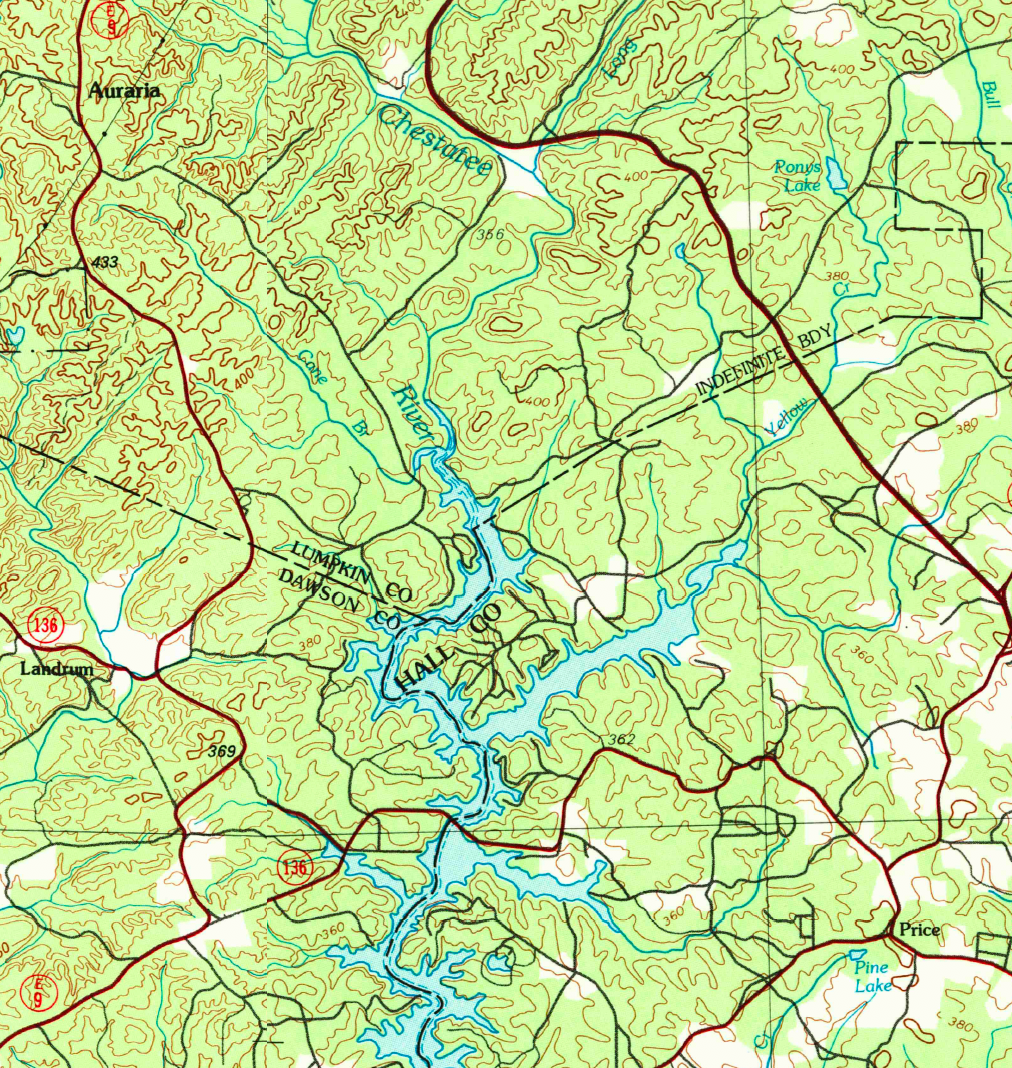
Topographic map showing Yellow Creek and the Chestatee River arm of Lake Lanier in the south

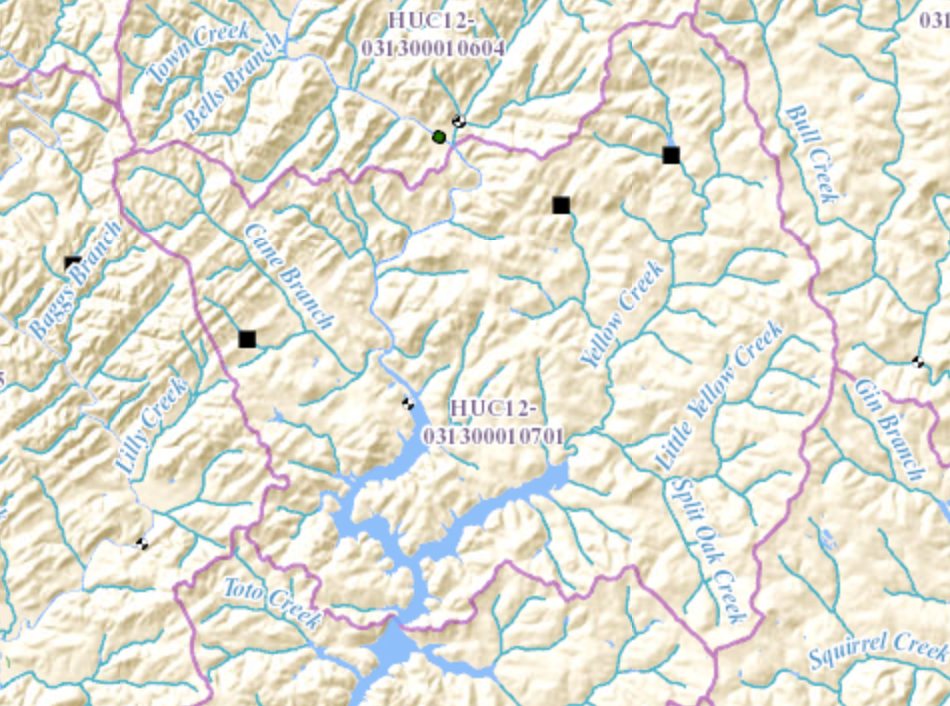
Map showing Yellow Creek and its sub-watershed (outlined in pink), and the Chestatee River arm of Lake Lanier

Yellow Creek rises in southern Lumpkin County, less than 2 miles east-northeast of the intersection of U.S. Route 19/State Route 60/State Route 115, and southeast of Dahlonega. The creek heads south for less than a mile, and crosses into Hall County to form Pony's Lake, then crosses back into Lumpkin County, picks up an unnamed branch that originates and runs parallel to Yellow Creek to this point, and heads back into Hall County approximately one mile further on. Yellow Creek crosses State Route 60 as it turns to the southwest, picks up another unnamed branch from the south of State Route 60, and then forms the Yellow Creek arm of Lake Lanier as it meets Little Yellow Creek west of Murrayville. This arm also receives one additional unnamed branch coming from the north, before Yellow Creek meets the Chestatee River, which is submerged under Lake Lanier at their point of confluence at the intersection of the two Lake Lanier arms.

== Sub-watershed details ==
The creek watershed and associated waters is designated by the United States Geological Survey as sub-watershed HUC 031300010701, is named the Yellow Creek-Chestatee River sub-watershed, and drains an area of approximately 27 square miles south of Dahlonega and west of Murrayville. The sub-watershed also encompasses the northern portion of the Chestatee River arm of Lake Lanier in Lumpkin County, which is to the west of the Yellow Creek arm, and which is where the Chestatee flows into Lake Lanier. The Chestatee River enters the sub-watershed immediately south of its confluence with Long Branch, picks up two unnamed branches as well as Cane Branch from the west, before forming the Chestatee arm of Lake Lanier, the northwesternmost arm of the lake. A small portion of the sub-watershed to the west of the Chestatee arm is located in Dawson County.

== See also ==
- Water Resource Region
- South Atlantic-Gulf Water Resource Region
- Apalachicola basin
