= Tate Creek =

Tate Creek may refer to:

- Tate Creek (Chestatee River), a stream in Georgia
- Tates Creek (Kentucky), a stream in Kentucky
