= Tesnatee, Georgia =

Unincorporated community in Georgia, U.S.

Coordinates: 34°32′30″N 83°49′55″W

Tesnatee is an unincorporated community in White County, in the U.S. state of Georgia.

== History ==
A post office called Tesnatee was established in 1880, and remained in operation until 1905. The community takes its name from nearby Tesnatee Creek. Variant names were "Tessantee" and "Tosnata".
