= Martin Creek (Chestatee River tributary) =

Stream in Georgia, U.S.

Coordinates: 34°19′35″N 83°54′33″W

Martin Creek is a stream in Georgia, and is a tributary of the Chestatee River. The creek is approximately 1.24 miles (2.00 km) long.

== Course ==
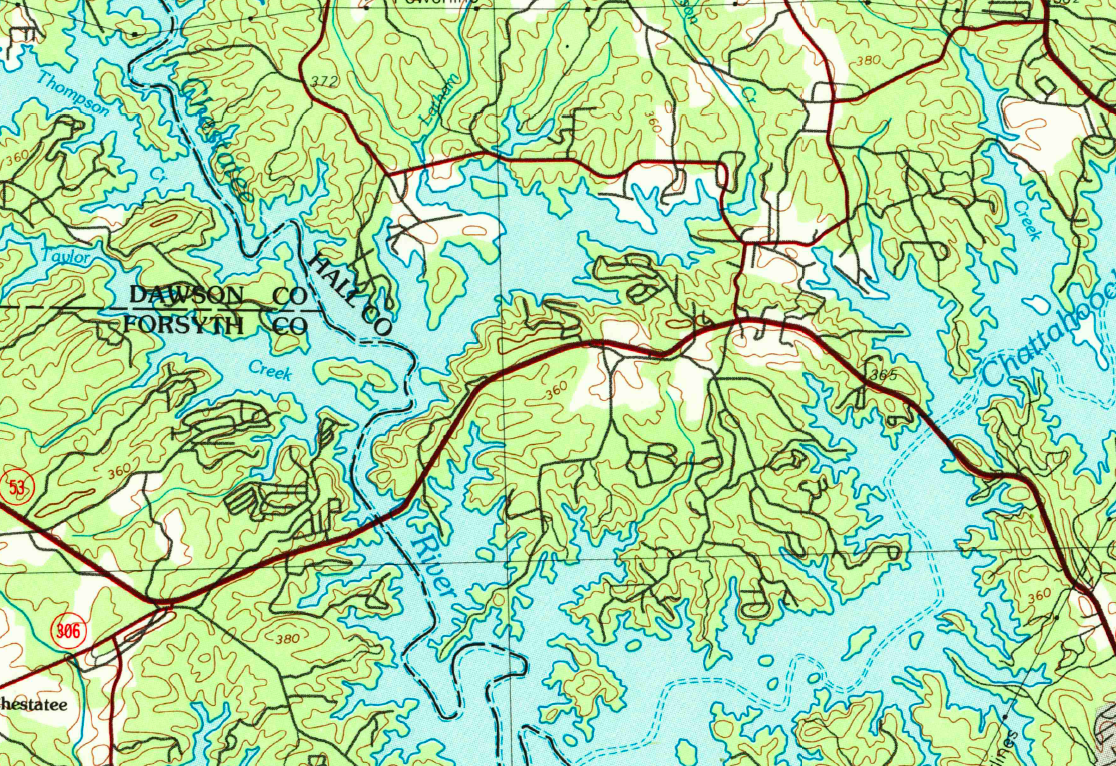
Topographic map showing Martin Creek and the Chestatee River arm of Lake Lanier in the south

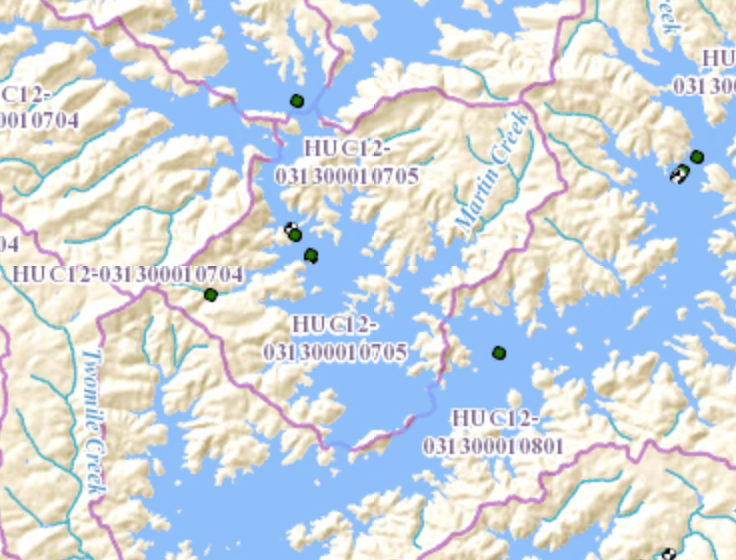
Map showing Martin Creek and its sub-watershed (outlined in pink), and the Chestatee River arm of Lake Lanier

Martin Creek rises in western Hall County, in the middle of a peninsula formed by the Chestatee River arm of Lake Lanier to the west, the Chattahoochee River arm of the lake to the east, and State Route 53 to the north. The area contains no other named or unnamed creeks except for Martin Creek. The creek heads south, then southwest, for approximately 1.2 miles, and flows into the Chestatee River and Lake Lanier just north of the confluence of the Chestatee River and Chattahoochee River arms of the lake, where it merges into the submerged Chestatee River.

== Sub-watershed details ==
The creek watershed and associated waters is designated by the United States Geological Survey as sub-watershed HUC 031300010705, is named the Martin Creek-Lake Sidney Lanier sub-watershed, and drains an area of approximately 8 square miles west of Gainesville and northeast of Chestatee. The sub-watershed extends south to the submerged meeting point of the two rivers, extends west to the intersection of State Route 306 and State Route 53 in Forsyth County, and extends east to Fork Road west of State Route 53 in Hall County.

== See also ==
- Water Resource Region
- South Atlantic-Gulf Water Resource Region
- Apalachicola basin
