= Cavender =

Cavender is a surname. Notable people with the surname include:

- Angela Lynn Cavender, birth name of Waziyatawin (born 1968), Native American professor, author and activist
- George R. Cavender (1919–2004), American music educator
- Glen Cavender (1883–1962), American film actor
- Harmon Cavender, fictional angel in "Cavender Is Coming", a Twilight Zone episode

== See also ==
- Cavenders Creek, a stream in Georgia, United States
- Cavender's, an American western wear retail chain
- Cavinder
