= Tesnatee Creek =

Stream in Georgia, U.S.

Coordinates: 34°37′56″N 83°45′18″W

Tesnatee Creek is a stream in Georgia, and is a tributary of the Chestatee River. The creek is approximately 12.06 miles (19.41 km) long.

Tesnatee is a name derived from the Cherokee language meaning "wild turkey".

== Course ==
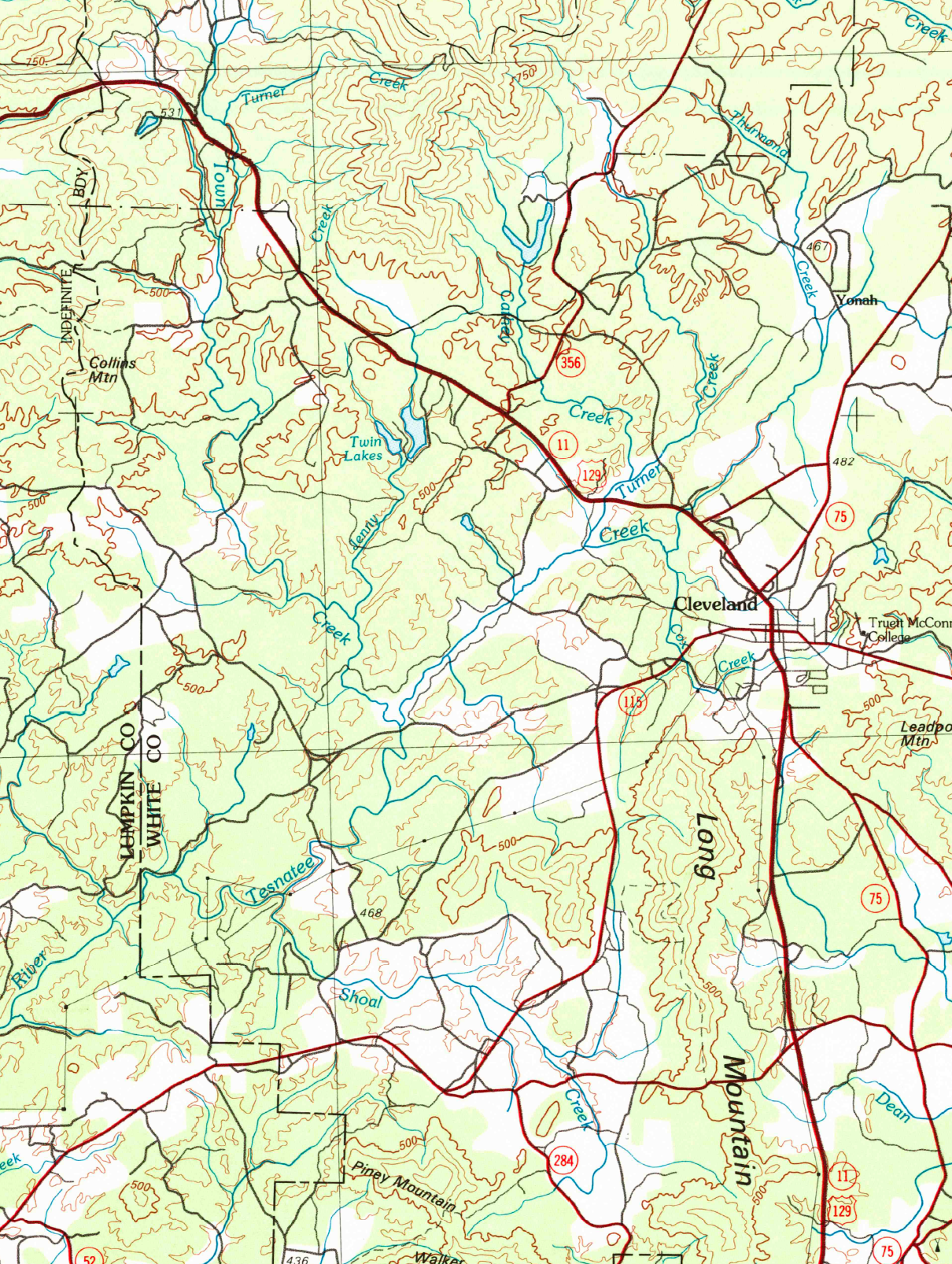
Topographic map showing Tesnatee Creek and the Chestatee River

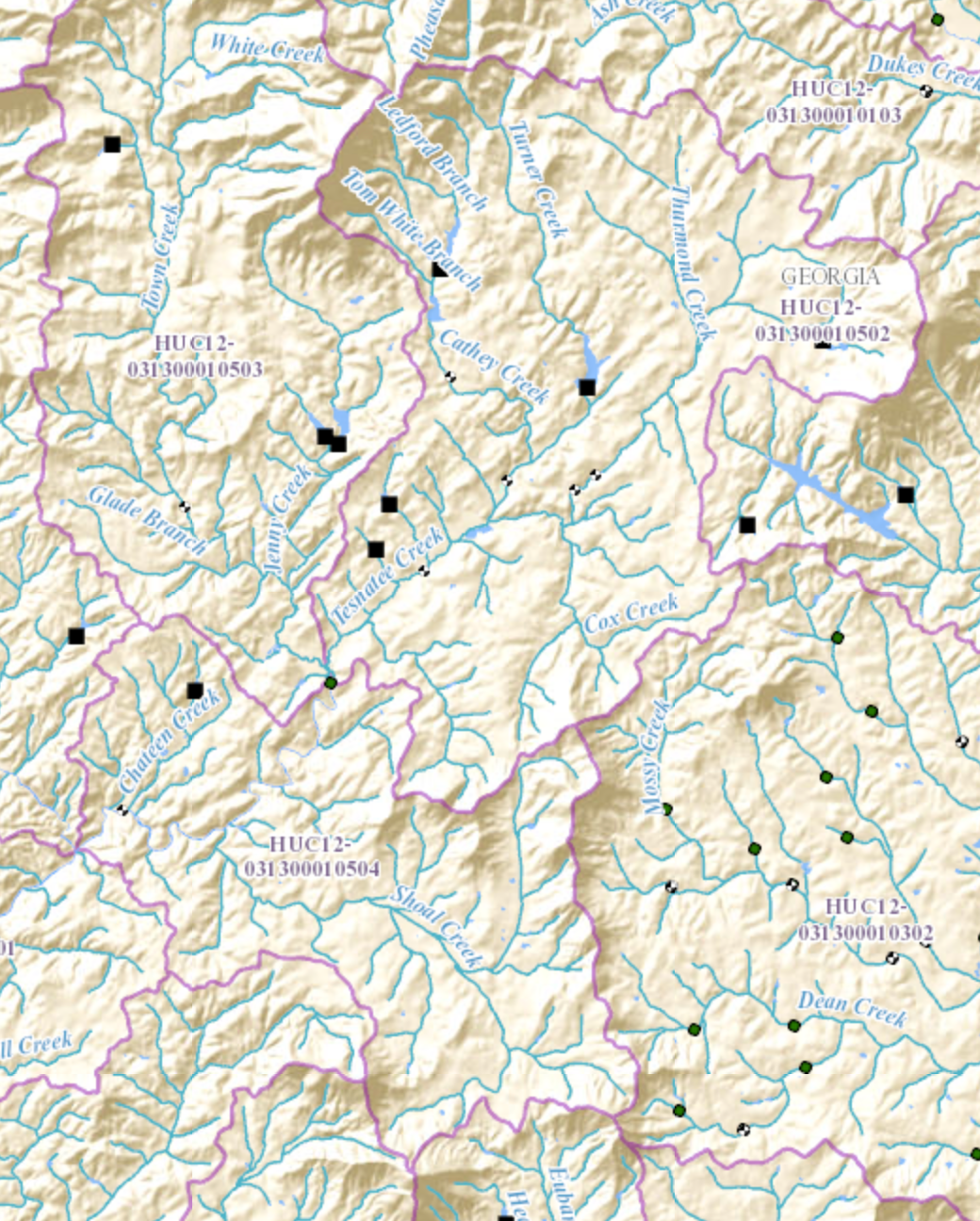
Map showing Tesnatee Creek and its 2 sub-watersheds (502 and 504) (outlined in pink), and the Chestatee River

The creek rises at the confluence of Thurmond Creek and Freeman Creek in the community of Yonah, west of Yonah Mountain and State Route 75, and north of Cleveland in White County. The creek heads in a southwesterly direction for approximately 2.6 miles, crosses U.S. Route 129 northwest of Cleveland, and makes a brief turn to the west as it picks up Cox Creek from the east, then turns back to the southwest for another 2.6 miles, picking up two unnamed branches on its way to its meeting with Town Creek. The combined creek, named Tesnatee Creek and taking on the appearance of a river rather than a creek in term of width, winds southwest and then to the west for approximately 2.9 miles, where it picks up Shoal Creek, which drains the area of southern White County between US 129 and southeast of Tesnatee Creek. Just northeast of where Tesnatee Creek flows into the Chestatee River, the creek is joined by Chateen Creek, and flows just across the border into Lumpkin County before it meets the Chestatee.

== Sub-basins ==
The creek watershed and associated waters is split into two designated sub-watersheds by the United States Geological Survey, namely as HUC 031300010502 for the Upper Tesnatee sub-watershed, and 031300010504 for the Lower Tesnatee sub-watershed. The Upper Tesnatee sub-basin drains an area of approximately 28 square miles north and west of Cleveland, while the Lower Tesnatee sub-basin drains an area of approximately 18 square miles southwest of Cleveland, and north of the Wahoo Creek-Little River watershed.

== See also ==
- Water Resource Region
- South Atlantic-Gulf Water Resource Region
- Apalachicola basin
