= Tate Creek (Chestatee River tributary) =

Stream in Georgia, U.S.

Coordinates: 34°36′39″N 83°57′46″W

Tate Creek is a stream in Georgia, and is a tributary of the Chestatee River. The creek is approximately 3.97 miles (6.39 km) long.

== Course ==
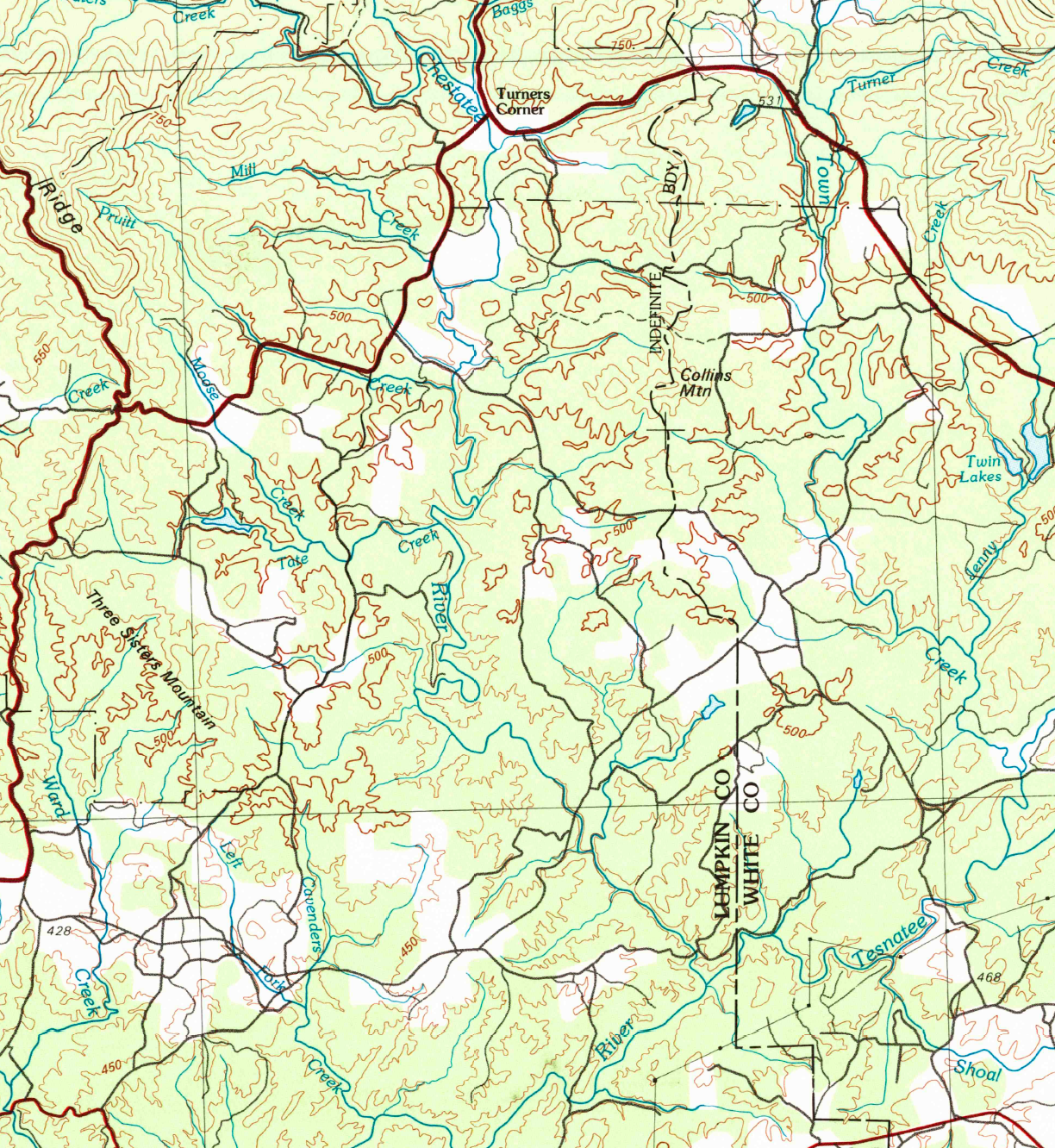
Topographic map showing Tate Creek and the Chestatee River

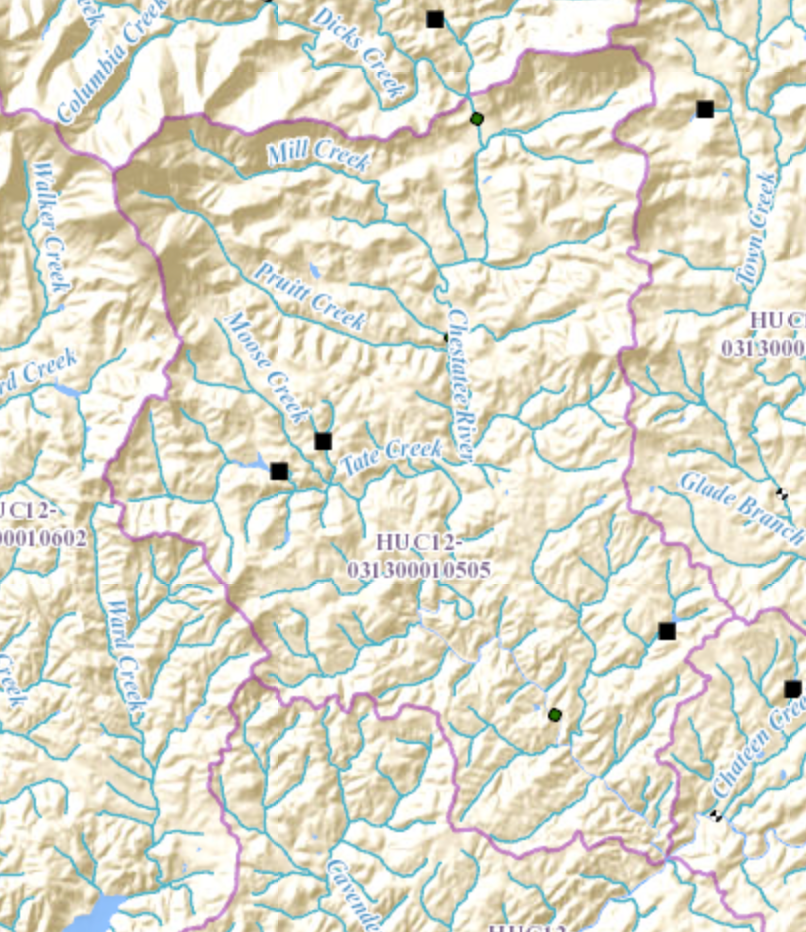
Map showing Tate Creek and its sub-watershed (outlined in pink), and the Chestatee River

Tate Creek rises in east-central Lumpkin County, just south of Porter Springs, where State Route 60 turns north and splits from U.S. Route 19, and just inside the Chattahoochee-Oconee National Forest. The creek heads south and then east for approximately 1.75 miles, forms Rodgers Lake, and then continues east to pick up Moose Creek from the north. Departing the national forest, the creek heads east for 1.35 miles, and then joins the Chestatee River just west of Frogtown Road.

== Sub-watershed details ==
The creek watershed and associated waters is designated by the United States Geological Survey as sub-watershed HUC 031300010505, is named the Tate Creek-Chestatee River sub-watershed, drains an area of approximately 31 square miles northwest of Cleveland, and is bisected by the Chestatee River. The sub-watershed around Tate Creek, which encompasses the Chestatee River from its confluence with Boggs Creek just south of its origin, to the confluence of the Chestatee River and Tesnatee Creek, drains a significant portion of eastern Lumpkin County. From north to south, 5 unnamed branches join the Chestatee from the east, while Mill Creek, Pruitt Creek, Tate Creek, and 6 other unnamed branches flow into the river from the west.

== See also ==
- Water Resource Region
- South Atlantic-Gulf Water Resource Region
- Apalachicola basin
