= Town Creek (Chestatee River tributary) =

Stream in Georgia, U.S.

Coordinates: 34°43′24″N 83°50′35″W

Town Creek is a stream in Georgia, and is a tributary of Tesnatee Creek, which in turns is a tributary of the Chestatee River. The creek is approximately 13.45 miles (21.65 km) long.

== Course ==
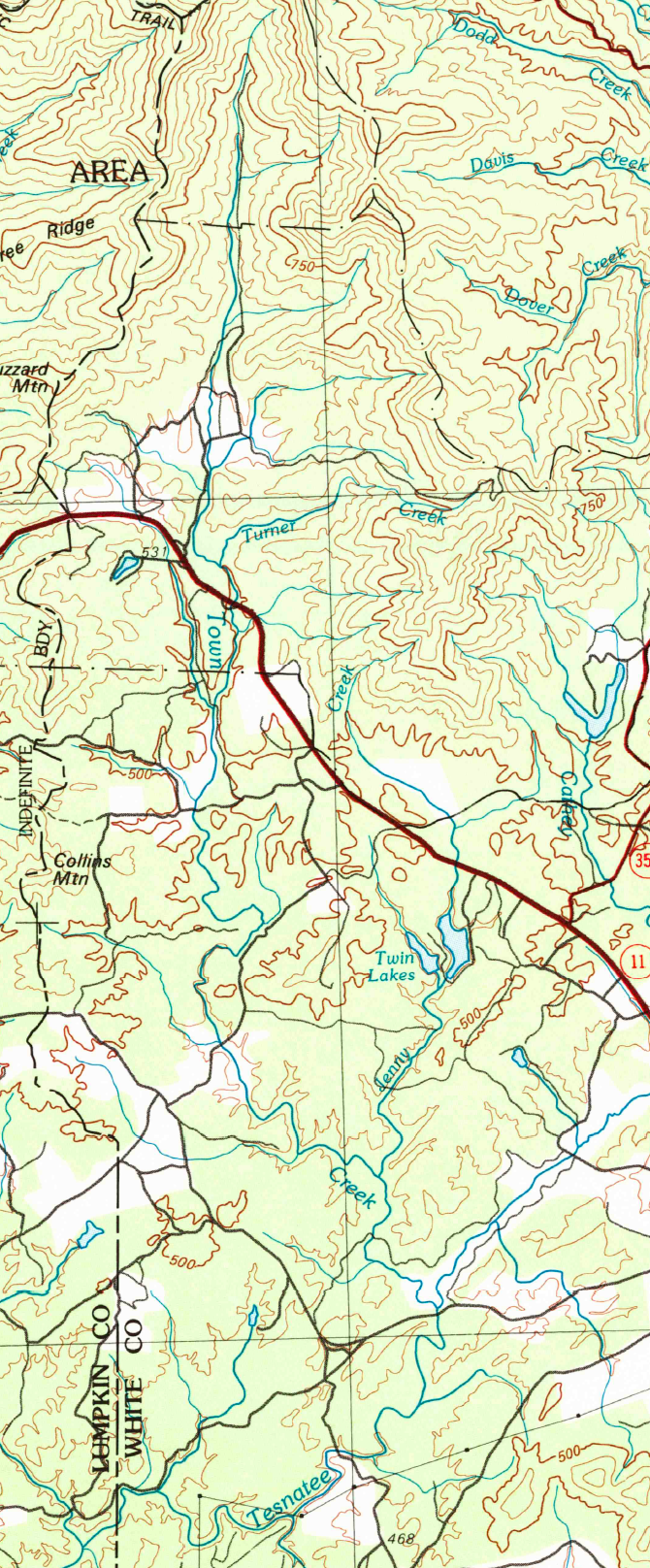
Topographic map showing Town Creek and the Chestatee River

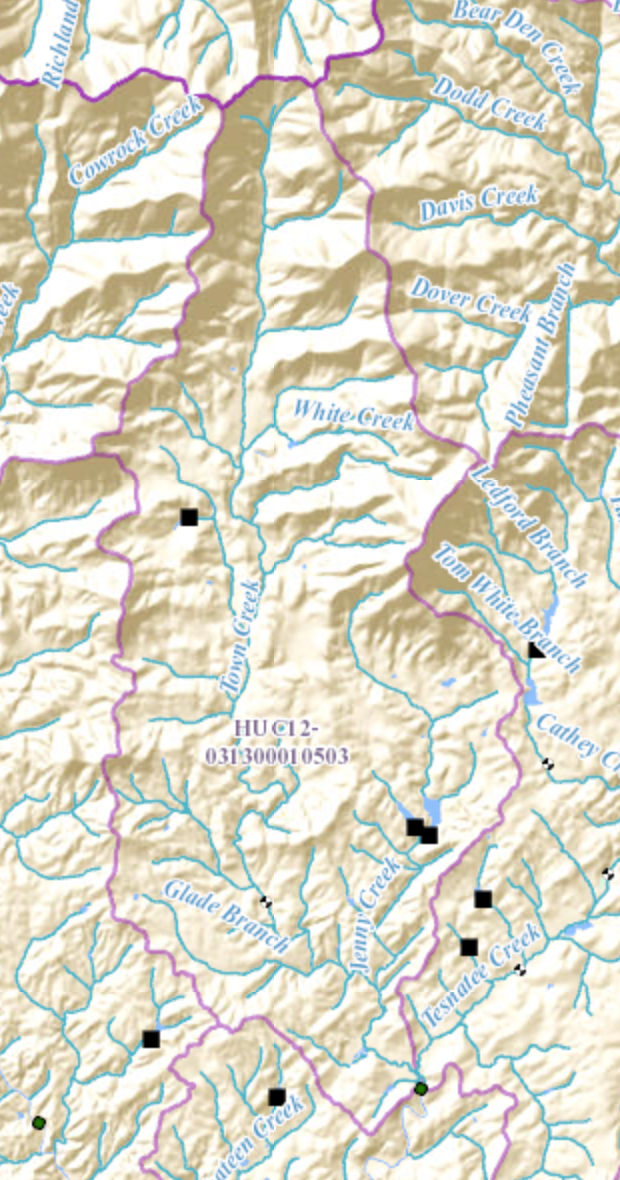
Map showing Town Creek and its sub-watershed (outlined in pink), and the Chestatee River

Town Creek rises in northwestern White County, just south of where State Route 348 turns north into Union County, at the north end of Tesnatee Gap in Raven Cliffs Wilderness. The creek heads south for approximately 3.6 miles, picking up two unnamed branches from the east on the way, before it first meets with White Creek coming from the east, an unnamed branch from the west, then Turner Creek, also coming from the east, before it crosses U.S. Route 129 east of Turners Corner. Town Creek continues to the south for approximately 5.6 miles, joining with 2 more unnamed branches from the west and one from the east, before its confluence with Glade Branch and then Jenny Creek. The creek flows into Tesnatee Creek about 1.5 miles further south, southwest of Cleveland.

== Sub-watershed details ==
The creek watershed and associated waters is designated by the United States Geological Survey as sub-watershed HUC 031300010503, is named the Town Creek sub-watershed, and drains an area of approximately 26 square miles northwest of Cleveland, and northeast of the Chestatee River.

== See also ==
- Water Resource Region
- South Atlantic-Gulf Water Resource Region
- Apalachicola basin
