= Cavinder =

Cavinder is a given name and a surname. Notable people with this name include:

== Given name ==
- Cavinder Bull, Singaporean lawyer

== Surname ==
- Haley Cavinder (born 2001), American Fresno State/Miami college basketball player and social media influencer
- Hanna Cavinder (born 2001), American Fresno State/Miami college basketball player and social media influencer
- Kristy Cavinder, Miss California 2009, Miss America 2010, 1st runner-up

== See also ==
- Cavender
