= Shaker Creek (Ohio) =

Stream in Ohio, U.S.

Coordinates: 39°28′15″N 84°21′39″W

Shaker Creek is a stream in the U.S. state of Ohio. The 8.7-mile (14.0 km) long stream empties into Dicks Creek.

Shaker Creek was so named after the Shakers who settled near it. The area around Shaker Creek once formed a wetland called Shaker Swamp; the latter was drained and the land reclaimed.
