= Yahoola Creek =

Stream in Georgia, U.S.

Coordinates: 34°38′49″N 84°00′22″W

- Etymology: Derived from the Cherokee language

Location
- Country: United States
- State: Georgia
- County: Lumpkin County

Physical characteristics
- Source: Confluence of Walden Creek and Walnut Cove Creek
  - location: north-central Lumpkin County, Georgia
- Mouth: Chestatee River
  - location: south of Dahlonega
- Length: 17.32 m (56.8 ft)

Basin features
- Tributaries
  - left: Jarrard Creek, Ward Creek, Tanyard Branch
  - right: Lee Creek, Robison Creek, Woody Creek, Bryant Creek
- Waterbodies: Lake Zwerner

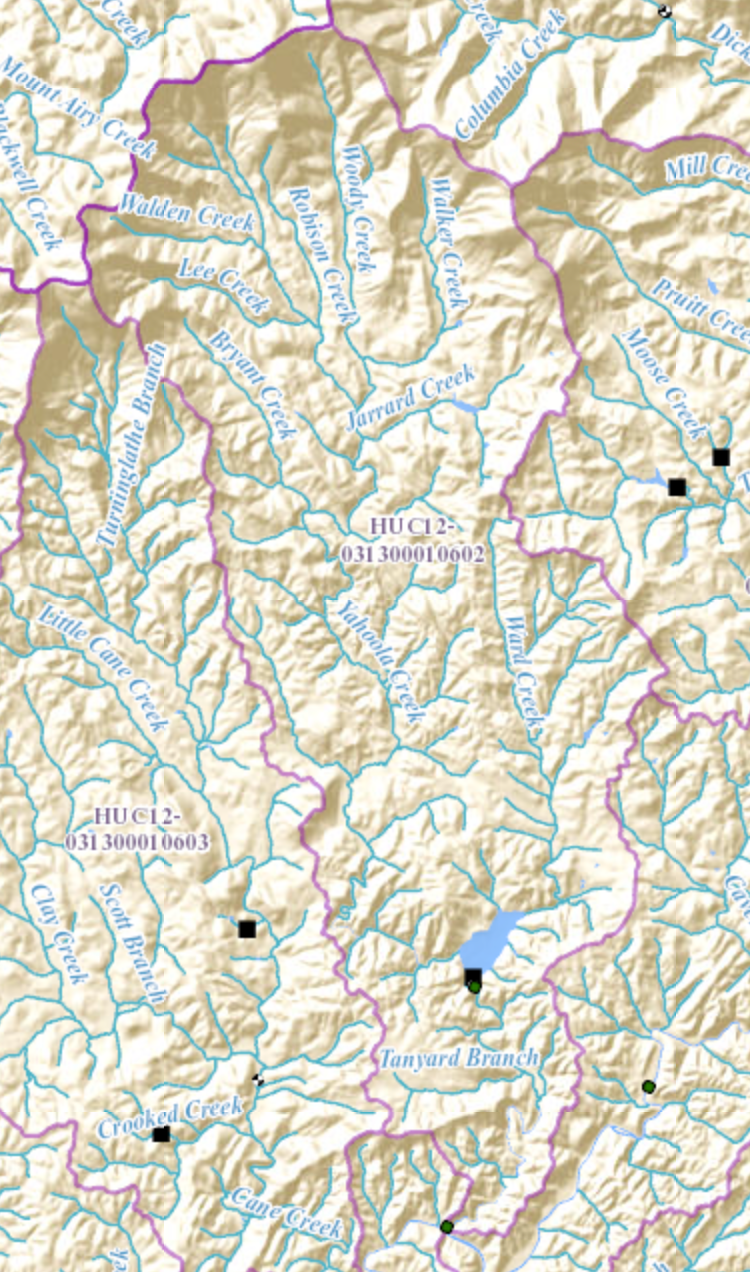
Map showing Yahoola Creek and its sub-watershed (outlined in pink), and the Chestatee River

Yahoola Creek is a stream in Georgia, and is a tributary of the Chestatee River. The creek is approximately 17.32 miles (27.87 km) long. Yahoola is a name derived from the Cherokee language.

== Course ==
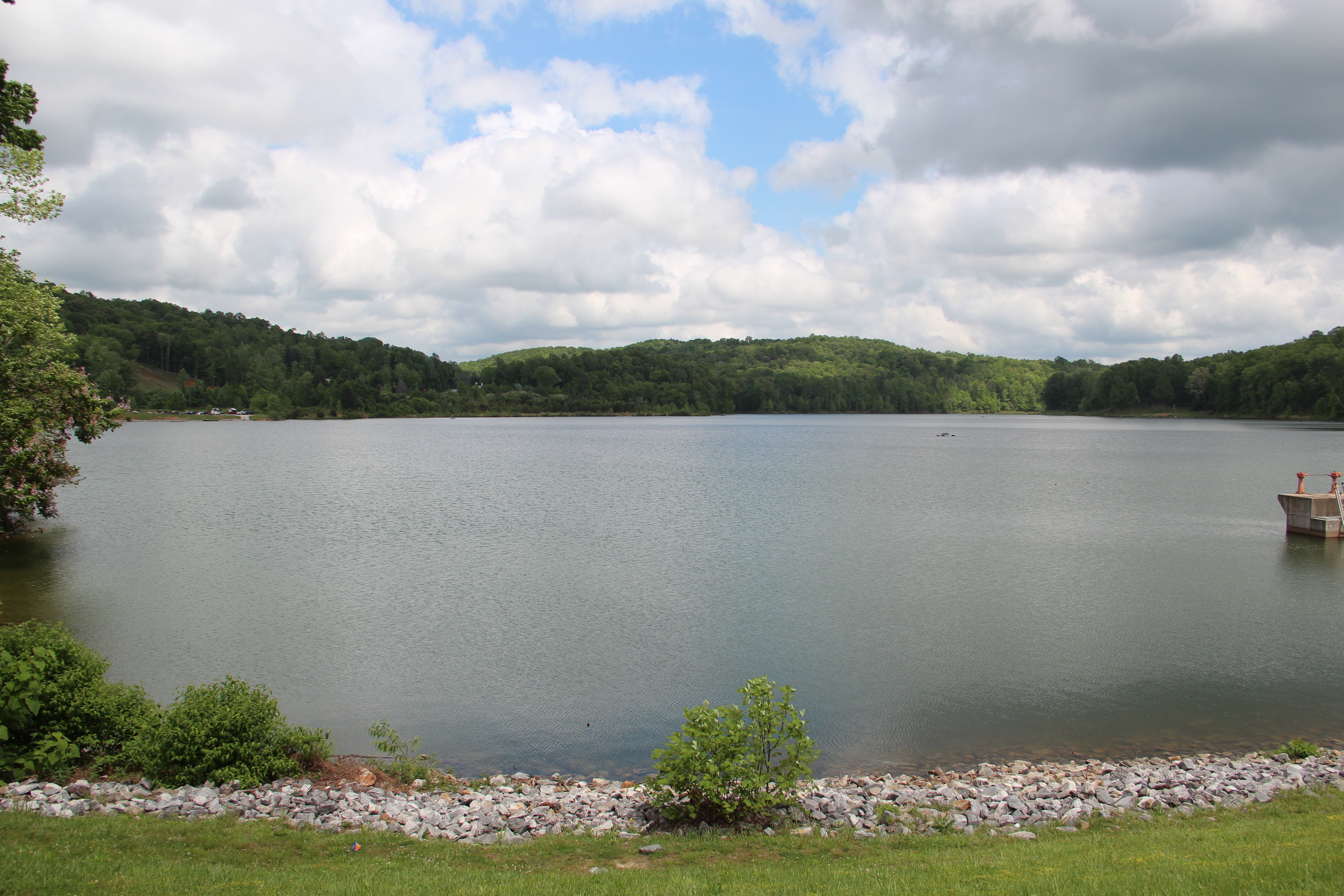
Lake Zwerner, a reservoir on Yahoola Creek

Yahoola Creek rises at the confluence of Walden Creek and Walnut Cove Creek in north-central Lumpkin County, approximately 2 miles southeast of Suches, and south of State Route 60, in the southern portion of the Chattahoochee-Oconee National Forest. The creek heads south for under a mile before picking up Lee Creek from the west and Robison Creek from the northeast, then continues south for another mile before being joined by Woody Creek from the north, which rises north of and runs parallel to Yahoola Creek until their confluence. Just a third of a mile further, the creek picks up Jarrard Creek from the east, then continues south and picks up two unnamed branches, before making a sharp westerly curve to meet with Bryant Creek, and turning back to the south. Yahoola Creek continues south for approximately 4.5 miles, exits the national forest, then meets Ward Creek after covering another 3.2 miles, just after crossing U.S. Route 19/State Route 60, where the two creeks form Lake Zwerner just north of Dahlonega. The creek exits Lake Zwerner to the south, and picks up Tanyard Branch after 1.6 miles, then joins the Chestatee River approximately 3 miles further south right as the waters again meet U.S. Route 19 and State Route 60 south of Dahlonega.

== Sub-watershed details ==
The creek watershed and associated waters is designated by the United States Geological Survey as sub-watershed HUC 031300010602, is named the Yahoola Creek sub-watershed, and drains an area of approximately 34 square miles north of Dahlonega. Bryant Creek to the west and Woody Creek to the northeast drain areas to either side of Yahoola Creek by picking up several unnamed branches each before joining the Yahoola.

== See also ==
- Water Resource Region
- South Atlantic-Gulf Water Resource Region
- Apalachicola basin
