= Wahoo Creek-Little River (Chattahoochee River tributary) =

Watershed in the US

Coordinates: 34.5242627°N 83.8182388°W

Wahoo Creek-Little River is a watershed in northeastern Georgia, encompassing three separate streams and four sub-watersheds, all of which come together and flow into Lake Lanier north of Gainesville. All three streams, namely Wahoo Creek, West Fork Little River, and East Fork Little River, rise in the very southwestern corner of White County, west of U.S. Route 129, and flow through Lumpkin County and Hall County into Lake Lanier. The watershed is part of the Upper Chattahoochee sub-basin of the larger Apalachicola basin.

== Watershed details ==
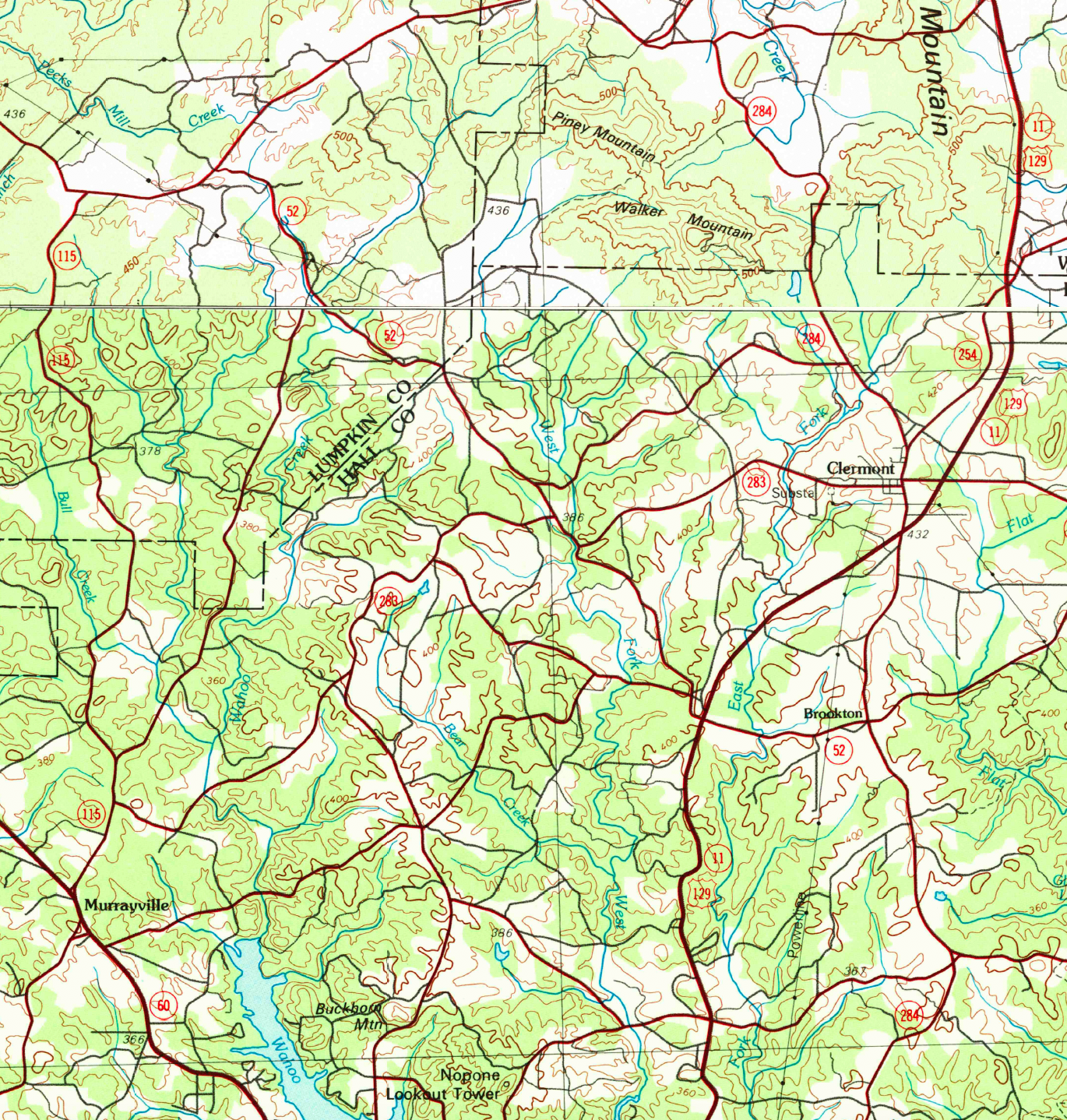
Topographic map showing Wahoo Creek, the Little River branches, and Lake Lanier

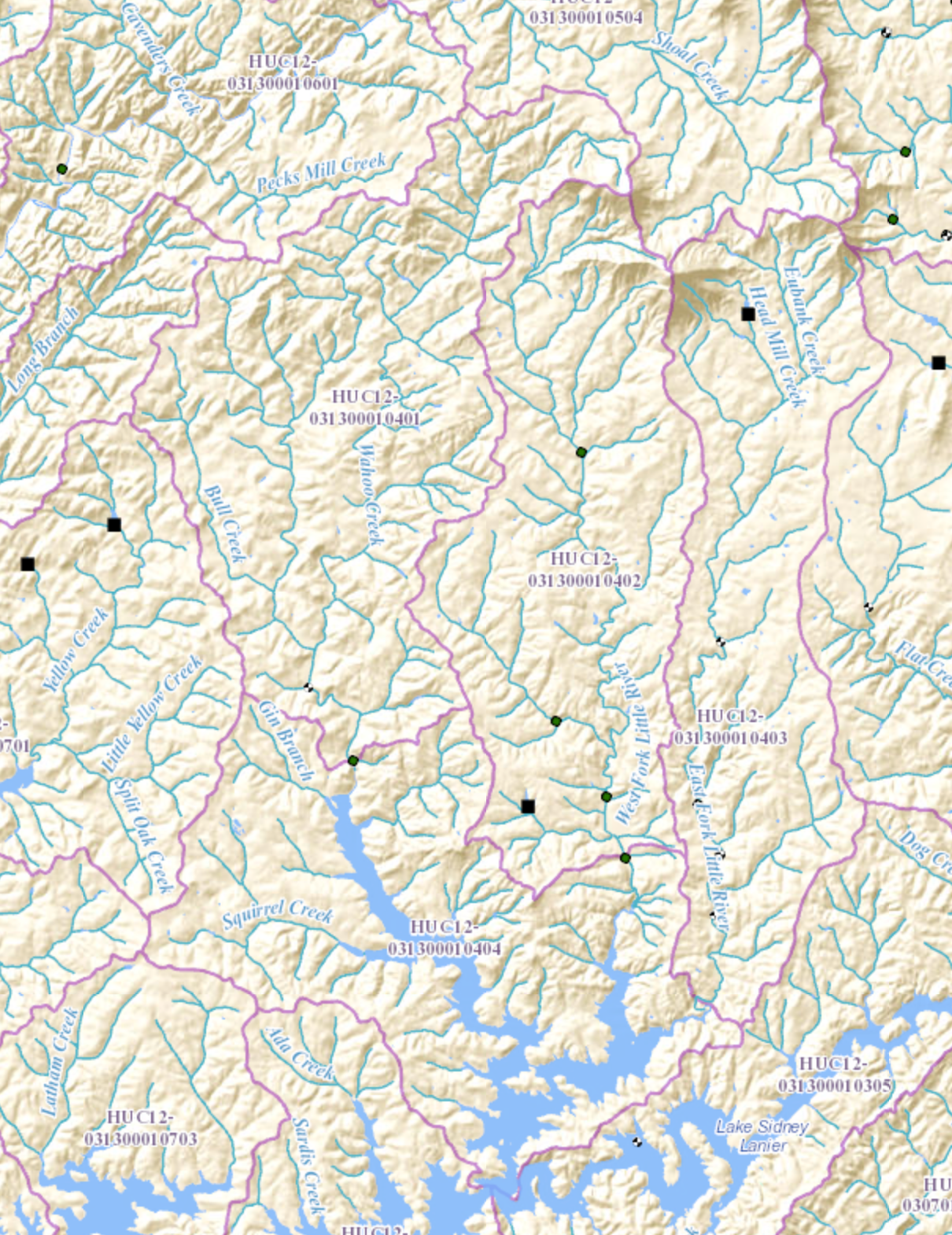
Map showing Wahoo Creek, the Little River branches, and their sub-watersheds (outlined in pink)

The Wahoo Creek-Little River watershed is designated by the United States Geological Survey as watershed HUC 0313000104, and drains an area of approximately 87 square miles. It extends from southwestern White County, where State Route 115 west of State Route 284 forms the northern border of the basin, counter-clockwise to Old Dahlonega Highway in the west, down through Murrayville and Price, then southeast along State Route 136 and then State Route 60 to the northern end of Thompson Bridge. From Thompson Bridge, the watershed extends east along Thompson Mill Road to U.S. Route 129, which the basin boundary follows northeast until US 129 turns north, while the boundary keeps heading northeast to follow State Route 284 north to Clermont, and completes the loop when it meets State Route 115.

== Sub-watersheds of Wahoo Creek-Little River ==
The Wahoo Creek-Little River watershed is made up of 4 sub-watersheds. Clockwise from the northwest they include:

Wahoo Creek - Wahoo Creek rises just inside White County, less than 1 mile south-southwest of the intersection between State Route 115 and the northern terminus of State Route 284, on the northern face of the northernmost of two ridges in the area. The creek runs north, then west, and turns southwest around the western edge of the ridge after about 1 mile, crosses into Lumpkin County, and continues in a southwesterly direction for approximately 2.8 miles, until it crosses State Route 52, where it turns to the south. Wahoo Creek continues running south for approximately 6 miles, before it is joined by Bull Creek from the west, which is a parallel system of 4 small streams draining the area east of State Route 115 in Lumpkin County, and west of the Wahoo Creek drainage basin. Wahoo Creek continues south for another 2.5 miles, and flows into Lake Lanier together with Gin Branch at the Wahoo Creek arm of the lake, the northern arm of Lake Lanier, just east of Murryaville. The creek is approximately 13.13 miles (21.13 km) long.

Wahoo Creek sub-watershed and associated waters is designated by the United States Geological Survey as sub-watershed HUC 031300010401, is named the Wahoo Creek sub-watershed, and drains an area of approximately 25 square miles northeast of Murrayville, and north of the Chattahoochee River and Lake Lanier. It is the westernmost of the 3 sub-watersheds in the Wahoo Creek-Little River watershed system, with the 4th sub-watershed encompassing the Lake Lanier portion of the watershed area.

West Fork Little River - West Fork Little River also rises just inside White County, less than 1 mile south of the source of Wahoo Creek, on the western face of Walker Mountain. The river fork runs west, and turns south around the western edge of the mountain after about 1.6 miles, crosses into Hall County, and continues in a southerly direction for approximately 3.2 miles, picking up various unnamed branches from both the west and east, until it crosses State Route 52 at its intersection with State Route 283. West Fork Little River continues running south for approximately 7 miles, and is joined by an unnamed creek system that originates just south of State Route 283 and runs parallel on the west of the river fork drainage basin. West Fork Little River flows into Lake Lanier at the West Fork Little River arm of the lake, between State Route 283 on the west and U.S. Route 129 on the east. The creek is approximately 12.63 miles (20.33 km) long.

West Fork Little River sub-watershed and associated waters is designated by the United States Geological Survey as sub-watershed HUC 031300010402, is named the West Fork Little River sub-watershed, and drains an area of approximately 21 square miles northeast and east of Murrayville, and north of the Chattahoochee River and Lake Lanier. It is the central basin of the 3 sub-watersheds in the Wahoo Creek-Little River watershed system, with the 4th sub-watershed encompassing the Lake Lanier portion of the watershed area.

East Fork Little River - East Fork Little River begins at the confluence of Head Mill Creek and Eubank Creek just inside Hall County, less than 1 mile northeast of Clermont. The two creeks that become the river fork both rise in White County, less than 1 mile east of the source of West Fork Little River, and east of Walker Mountain. The river fork runs south, crosses State Route 283 west of Clermont, and continues in a southerly direction for approximately 1.7 miles, picking up two unnamed branches north and south of its crossing of U.S. Route 129, and continues south and crosses State Route 52. East Fork Little River continues south and closely parallels US 129 for approximately 6.3 miles, and flows into Lake Lanier at the East Fork Little River arm of the lake, just east of where U.S. Route 129 crosses that arm. The creek is approximately 10.56 miles (16.99 km) long.

East Fork Little River sub-watershed and associated waters is designated by the United States Geological Survey as sub-watershed HUC 031300010403, is named the East Fork Little River sub-watershed, and drains an area of approximately 18 square miles north and south of Clermont, and north of the Chattahoochee River and Lake Lanier. It is the easternmost basin of the 3 sub-watersheds in the Wahoo Creek-Little River watershed system, with the 4th sub-watershed encompassing the Lake Lanier portion of the watershed area.

Little River-Lake Sidney Lanier - The Lake Lanier sub-watershed of this watershed system encompasses the three arms of Lake Lanier west of Murrayville, and east of the Chattahoochee River arm of the lake. West of the Wahoo Creek arm, one other named creek, namely Squirrel Creek, flows into that arm from the west, otherwise the sub-watershed includes the lake arms of Wahoo Creek, West Fork Little River, and East Fork Little River, and the area in between these arms. Thompson Bridge and State Route 60 form the southern border of the sub-watershed.

Little River-Lake Sidney Lanier sub-watershed and associated waters is designated by the United States Geological Survey as sub-watershed HUC 031300010404, is named the Little River-Lake Sidney Lanier sub-watershed, and drains an area of approximately 23 square miles at the northern extend of Lake Lanier. It is the southernmost basin of the 4 sub-watersheds in the Wahoo Creek-Little River watershed system.

== See also ==
- Water Resource Region
- South Atlantic-Gulf Water Resource Region
- Apalachicola basin
