= Chestatee, Georgia =

Unincorporated community in Georgia, U.S.

Coordinates: 34°17′39″N 83°59′59″W

Chestatee is an unincorporated community in northeastern Forsyth County, Georgia, United States, due west of the confluence of the Chestatee River into the Chattahoochee River. Originally a Cherokee settlement, it was called Atsunsta Ti Yi. The population of the Chestatee Census County Division was 19,005 at the 2020 United States Census.

The word "Chestatee" is a Cherokee word meaning roughly "pine torch place" or "place of lights", because they would use bonfires along the riverbanks to light their torches. They would then use these torches for hunting deer and other wild game in the forest. A post office called Chestatee was established in 1880, and remained in operation until being discontinued in 1904.

The Vann Ferry, owned by Cherokee Indian Chief Vann, is just east of Chestatee, on the road to Gainesville.
