= Frogtown Creek =

Stream in Lumpkin County, Georgia, U.S.

Coordinates: 34°40′14″N 83°54′42″W

Frogtown Creek is a stream in Lumpkin County, Georgia, in the United States.

Frogtown is the figurative English translation of the Cherokee language name, which literally means "frog place". An Indian village once stood near the creek's bank.

== See also ==
- List of rivers of Georgia (U.S. state)
