= Shaker Creek (Kentucky) =

Stream in Kentucky, U.S.

Coordinates: 37°50′50″N 84°45′57″W

Shaker Creek is a stream in the U.S. state of Kentucky. It is a tributary to the Kentucky River.

Shaker Creek was named after the Shakers who settled near it. A variant name is "Shaker Fork".
