= Taylor Creek (Duck River tributary) =

Stream in Hickman County, Tennessee, U.S.

Coordinates: 35.826177°N 87.584462°W

Taylor Creek is a stream in Hickman County, Tennessee, United States. It is a tributary of the Duck River.

Taylor Creek was named for a pioneer named Taylor who was the original owner of land surrounding the creek.

== See also ==
- List of rivers of Tennessee
