= Toto Creek =

River

Coordinates: 34.3982°N 83.9946°W

Toto Creek is a stream in the U.S. state of Georgia. It is a tributary to the Chestatee River.

Toto Creek derives its name from Child Toter, a Cherokee chieftain.
