= Dicks Creek (Great Miami River tributary) =

Stream in Butler and Warren County, Ohio, U.S.

Dicks Creek is a stream in Butler and Warren counties, in the U.S. state of Ohio It is a tributary of the Great Miami River.

In the 19th century, the waters of Dicks Creek powered saw mills, grist mills, and a distillery.

== Location ==
- Mouth: Middletown, Ohio at 39°28′10″N 84°25′26″W
- Source: Franklin, Ohio at 39°29′48″N 84°16′03″W

== See also ==
- List of rivers of Ohio
