= ACF River Basin =

Drainage basin of the Apalachicola River in the southeastern US

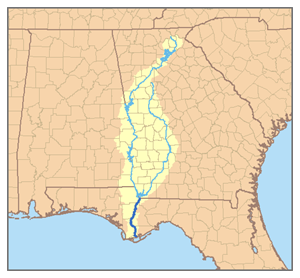
Map of the ACF River Basin watershed showing the Apalachicola River and its two main tributaries, the Chattahoochee River and Flint River.

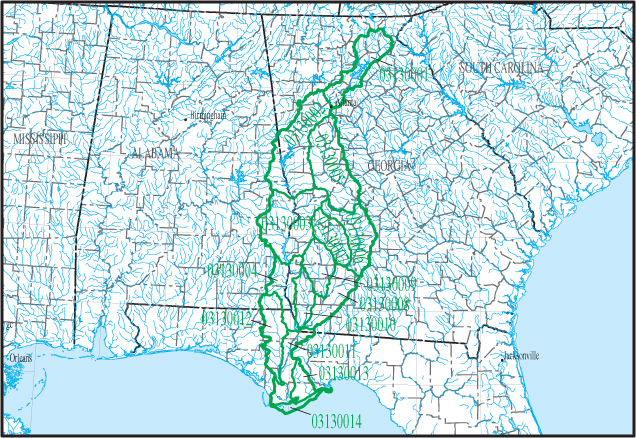
Map of HUC031300 - Apalachicola sub-region and basin in the South Atlantic-Gulf Water Resource Region, showing the 14 sub-basins in the basin.

The Apalachicola–Chattahoochee–Flint River Basin (the ACF River Basin) is the drainage basin, or watershed, of the Apalachicola River, Chattahoochee River, and Flint River, in the Southeastern United States.

This area is alternatively known as simply the Apalachicola Basin and is listed by the United States Geological Survey as basin HUC 031300, as well as sub-region HUC 0313. It is located in the South Atlantic-Gulf Water Resource Region, which is listed as HUC 03. The basin is further sub-divided into 14 sub-basins.

== Geography ==
The ACF River Basin begins in the mountains of northeast Georgia, and drains much of metro Atlanta, most of west Georgia and southwest Georgia and adjoining counties of southeast Alabama, before it splits the central part of the Florida Panhandle and flows into the Gulf of Mexico at Apalachicola Bay, near Apalachicola, Florida. It drains an area of 20,355 square miles. Most of the northern half of the basin abuts the Eastern Continental Divide on the east, and the ACT River Basin to the west.

== Listing of Water Resource Sub-Basins ==
Sub-Basin HUC	Sub-Basin Name	Sub-Basin Description	Sub-Basin Location	Sub-Basin Size (mi^{2})	Sub-Basin Map
03130001	Upper Chattahoochee	The drainage and associated waters of the Chattahoochee River from the source of the river in Union County, running southwest through Lake Lanier to a line from Marietta through Smyrna, Atlanta, and Decatur, to Stone Mountain.	Located entirely in Georgia, in the counties of Union, Towns, Rabun, Lumpkin, White, Habersham, Dawson, Hall, Banks, Cherokee, Forsyth, Gwinnett, Cobb, Fulton, and DeKalb.	1,586	HUC03130001
03130002	Middle Chattahoochee-Lake Harding	The drainage and associated waters of the Chattahoochee River from a line from Marietta through Smyrna, Atlanta, and Decatur, to Stone Mountain, heading first southwest, then south, to a line from Opelika to just north of Columbus to east of Ellerslie.	Located in Alabama and Georgia, in the counties of Cobb, Paulding, Carroll, Douglas, Fulton, Clayton, Coweta, Heard, Randolph, Chambers, Troup, Meriwether, Lee, Harris, Talbot, Russell, and Muscogee.	3,041	HUC03130002
03130003	Middle Chattahoochee-Walter F. George Lake	The drainage and associated waters of the Chattahoochee River from a line from Opelika to just north of Columbus to east of Ellerslie, heading south, to the Walter F. George Lock and Dam at the southern end of Walter F. George Lake.	Located in Alabama and Georgia, in the counties of Lee, Macon, Russell, Harris, Muscogee, Talbot, Chattahoochee, Marion, Taylor, Bullock, Barbour, Stewart, Webster, Quitman, Henry, Clay, and Randolph.	2,837	HUC03130003
03130004	Lower Chattahoochee	The drainage and associated waters of the Chattahoochee River from the Walter F. George Lock and Dam at the southern end of Walter F. George Lake, heading south, to the Jim Woodruff Lock and Dam at the southern end of Lake Seminole.	Located in Alabama, Florida, and Georgia, in the counties of Barbour, Henry, Clay, Randolph, Early, Houston, Jackson, Seminole, Decatur, and Gadsden.	1,244	HUC03130004
03130005	Upper Flint	The drainage and associated waters of the Flint River from the source of the Flint River in East Point, heading south, to a line from the northwestern corner of Schley County through Ideal to State Route 49 north of Montezuma.	Located entirely in Georgia, in the counties of Fulton, Clayton, Coweta, Fayette, Henry, Spalding, Meriwether, Pike, Lamar, Upson, Monroe, Harris, Talbot, Taylor, Crawford, Marion, Schley, Macon, and Peach.	2,630	HUC03130005
03130006	Middle Flint	The drainage and associated waters of the Flint River from a line from the northwestern corner of Schley County through Ideal to State Route 49 north of Montezuma, heading southeast and south, to a line running southeast from Albany into central Worth County and west of Sylvester.	Located entirely in Georgia, in the counties of Marion, Taylor, Schley, Macon, Houston, Sumter, Dooly, Crips, Lee, Dougherty, Worth, and Turner.	1,558	HUC03130006
03130007	Kinchafoonee-Muckalee	The drainage and associated waters of Kinchafoonee Creek and Muckalee Creek from central Marion County, at the source of Kinchafoonee Creek, heading south-southeast, to where Kinchafoonee Creek meets the Flint River in Albany.	Located entirely in Georgia, in the counties of Chattahoochee, Marion, Schley, Stewart, Webster, Sumter, Terrell, Lee, and Dougherty.	1,101	HUC03130007
03130008	Lower Flint	The drainage and associated waters of the Flint River from a line running roughly parallel to U.S. Route 82 from northwest of Albany to State Route 112 southwest of Sylvester, running southwest to where the Flint River flows into Lake Seminole.	Located in Florida and Georgia, in the counties of Terrell, Lee, Dougherty, Worth, Baker, Mitchell, Colquitt, Miller, Seminole, Decatur, Grady, and Gadsden.	1,274	HUC03130008
03130009	Ichawaynochaway	The drainage and associated waters of Ichawaynochaway Creek from the source of Ichawaynochaway Creek just northwest of Weston, running south to where the Ichawaynochaway flows into the Flint River, halfway between Colquitt and Camilla.	Located entirely in Georgia, in the counties of Stewart, Webster, Randolph, Terrell, Lee, Clay, Calhoun, Dougherty, Early, Baker, and Miller.	1,104	HUC03130009
03130010	Spring	The drainage and associated waters of Spring Creek from the source of Spring Creek northwest of Bluffton, running south to where the Spring flows into Lake Seminole.	Located entirely in Georgia, in the counties of Clay, Calhoun, Early, Miller, Seminole, and Decatur.	789	HUC03130010
03130011	Apalachicola	The drainage and associated waters of the Apalachicola River from the Jim Woodruff Lock and Dam at the southern end of Lake Seminole, running south through the Florida Panhandle to where it flows into Apalachicola Bay and the Gulf of Mexico.	Located in Florida and Georgia, in the counties of Decatur, Jackson, Gadsden, Calhoun, Liberty, Gulf, and Franklin.	1,117	HUC03130011
03130012	Chipola	The drainage and associated waters of the Chipola River from south of Dothan, running south through the Florida Panhandle to where it flows into the Apalachicola River in Gulf.	Located in Alabama and Florida, in the counties of Geneva, Houston, Jackson, Washington, Calhoun, Bay, and Gulf.	1,292	HUC03130012
03130013	New	The drainage and associated waters of the New River from central Liberty County, running south through the Florida Panhandle to where it flows into Apalachicola Bay.	Located entirely in Florida, in the counties of Liberty and Franklin.	514	HUC03130013
03130014	Apalachicola Bay	The drainage and associated waters of Apalachicola Bay.	Located entirely in Florida, in the counties of Gulf and Franklin.	268	HUC03130014

== Water wars ==
Beginning in 1991, the states of Alabama, Florida, and Georgia have been embroiled in a large-scale legal conflict over the Appalachicola-Chattahoochee-Flint river basin and its resources, known as the Tri-state water dispute. Georgia has also lobbied the United States Congress to end navigation on the Appalachicola and lower Chattahoochee, to conserve more water during droughts. Keeping the two rivers at a navigable depth during these times requires large releases from dams upstream, sending potential drinking water downstream for shipping, and often dropping lakes to levels dangerous to boaters.

=== Conservation ===
Other ecological conservation and economic concerns include protecting harvests of oysters in Apalachicola Bay, which require a large enough flow of fresh water to prevent excessive saltwater intrusion from the Gulf. Numerous endangered and imperiled species occur in the basin, including many endemic mussels

The cost of dredging silt, much of it caused by uncontrolled growth across metro Atlanta's fine red clay soil, has also been criticized as a wasteful exercise to float so little ship traffic.
