= South Atlantic–Gulf water resource region =

US hydrologic region

The South Atlantic–Gulf water resource region is one of 21 major geographic areas, or regions, in the first level of classification used by the United States Geological Survey to divide and subdivide the United States into successively smaller hydrologic units. These geographic areas contain either the drainage area of a major river, or the combined drainage areas of a series of rivers.

The South Atlantic–Gulf region, which is listed with a 2-digit hydrologic unit code (HUC) of 03, has an approximate size of 141,984 square miles (367,740 square kilometers), and consists of 18 subregions, which are listed with the 4-digit HUCs 0301 through 0318.

This region includes the drainage that ultimately discharges into: (a) the Atlantic Ocean within and between the states of Virginia and Florida; (b) the Gulf of Mexico within and between the states of Florida and Louisiana; and (c) the associated waters. The geographic area of the South Atlantic–Gulf region includes all of Florida and South Carolina, and parts of Alabama, Georgia, Louisiana, Mississippi, North Carolina, Tennessee, and Virginia.

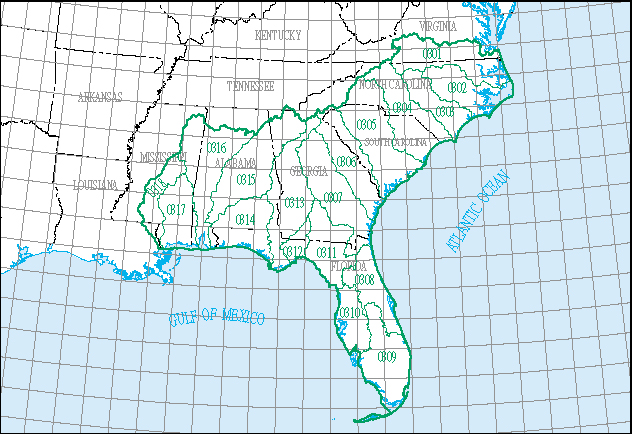
The South Atlantic–Gulf region, with its 18 4-digit sub-region hydrologic unit boundaries.

== Listing of water resource subregions ==
Subregion HUC	Subregion Name	Subregion Description	Subregion Location	Subregion Size	Subregion Map
0301	Chowan–Roanoke Subregion	The coastal drainage and associated waters from and including the Back Bay drainage to Oregon Inlet.	Located in Virginia and North Carolina.	19,063 sq mi (49,370 km^{2})	HUC0301
0302	Neuse–Pamlico Subregion	The coastal drainage and associated waters from Oregon Inlet to Browns Inlet.	Located in North Carolina.	14,305 sq mi (37,050 km^{2})	HUC0302
0303	Cape Fear Subregion	The coastal drainage and associated waters from Browns Inlet to and including the Cape Fear River Basin.	Located in North Carolina.	9,224 sq mi (23,890 km^{2})	HUC0303
0304	Pee Dee Subregion	The coastal drainage and associated waters from the Cape Fear River Basin boundary to the Santee River Basin boundary.	Located in North Carolina, South Carolina, and Virginia.	18,865 sq mi (48,860 km^{2})	HUC0304
0305	Edisto–Santee Subregion	The coastal drainage and associated waters from and including the Santee River Basin to the Savannah River Basin boundary.	Located in Georgia, North Carolina, and South Carolina.	23,859 sq mi (61,790 km^{2})	HUC0305
0306	Ogeechee–Savannah Subregion	The coastal drainage and associated waters from and including the Savannah River Basin to the Altamaha River Basin boundary.	Located in Georgia, North Carolina, and South Carolina.	16,926 sq mi (43,840 km^{2})	HUC0306
0307	Altamaha–St. Marys Subregion	The coastal drainage and associated waters from and including the Altamaha River Basin to the St. Johns River Basin boundary.	Located in Florida and Georgia.	20,785 sq mi (53,830 km^{2})	HUC0307
0308	St. Johns Subregion	The coastal drainage and associated waters from and including the St. Johns River Basin to St. Lucie Inlet.	Located in Florida.	11,387 sq mi (29,490 km^{2})	HUC0308
0309	Southern Florida Subregion	The coastal drainage and associated waters from St. Lucie Inlet to and including the Caloosahatchee River Basin, and interior drainage south of the St. Johns and Peace River Basins.	Located in Florida.	17,803 sq mi (46,110 km^{2})	HUC0309
0310	Peace–Tampa Bay Subregion	The coastal drainage and associated waters from the Caloosahatchee River Basin boundary to and including the Withlacoochee River Basin.	Located in Florida.	9,751 sq mi (25,250 km^{2})	HUC0310
0311	Suwannee Subregion	The coastal drainage and associated waters from the Withlacoochee River Basin boundary to and including the Aucilla River Basin.	Located in Florida and Georgia.	13,520 sq mi (35,000 km^{2})	HUC0311
0312	Ochlockonee Subregion	The coastal drainage and associated waters from the Aucilla River Basin boundary to and including the Ochlockonee River Basin.	Located in Florida and Georgia.	3,665 sq mi (9,490 km^{2})	HUC0312
0313	Apalachicola Subregion	The coastal drainage and associated waters from the Ochlockonee River Basin boundary to and including the Apalachicola River Basin and the drainage into Apalachicola Bay.	Located in Alabama, Florida, and Georgia.	20,355 sq mi (52,720 km^{2})	HUC0313
0314	Choctawhatchee–Escambia Subregion	The coastal drainage and associated waters from the Apalachicola Bay drainage boundary to the Mobile Bay drainage boundary.	Located in Alabama and Florida.	14,930 sq mi (38,700 km^{2})	HUC0314
0315	Alabama Subregion	The Alabama River Basin.	Located in Alabama, Georgia, and Tennessee.	22,739 sq mi (58,890 km^{2})	HUC0315
0316	Mobile–Tombigbee Subregion	The drainage into Mobile Bay excluding the Alabama River Basin.	Located in Alabama and Mississippi.	21,833 sq mi (56,550 km^{2})	HUC0316
0317	Pascagoula Subregion	The coastal drainage and associated waters in Alabama and Mississippi north and east of the Louisiana-Mississippi state line from the Mobile Bay drainage boundary to the Pearl River (Mississippi–Louisiana) Basin boundary.	Located in Alabama and Mississippi.	11,965 sq mi (30,990 km^{2})	HUC0317
0318	Pearl Subregion	The Pearl River basin.	Located in Louisiana and Mississippi.	8,689 sq mi (22,500 km^{2})	HUC0318

== See also ==
- List of rivers in the United States
- Water Resource Region
