= Hydrologic unit system (United States) =

Watershed tracking system

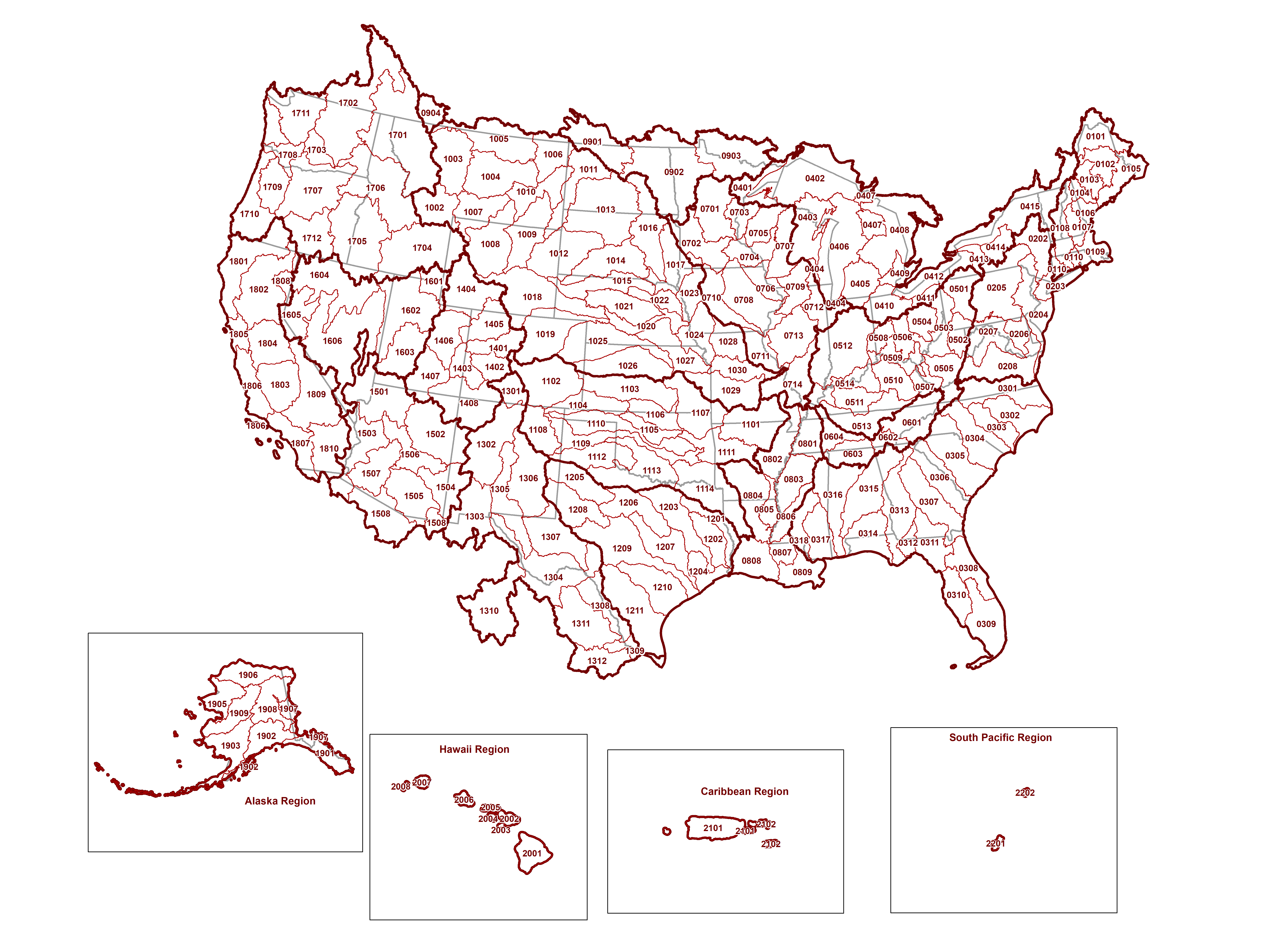
This map of United States water resource subregion hydrologic units updated boundaries to include the ocean as well as the portions of the basins that cross international borders

For the use of hydrologists, ecologists, and water-resource managers in the study of surface water flows in the United States, the United States Geological Survey created a hierarchical system of hydrologic units.

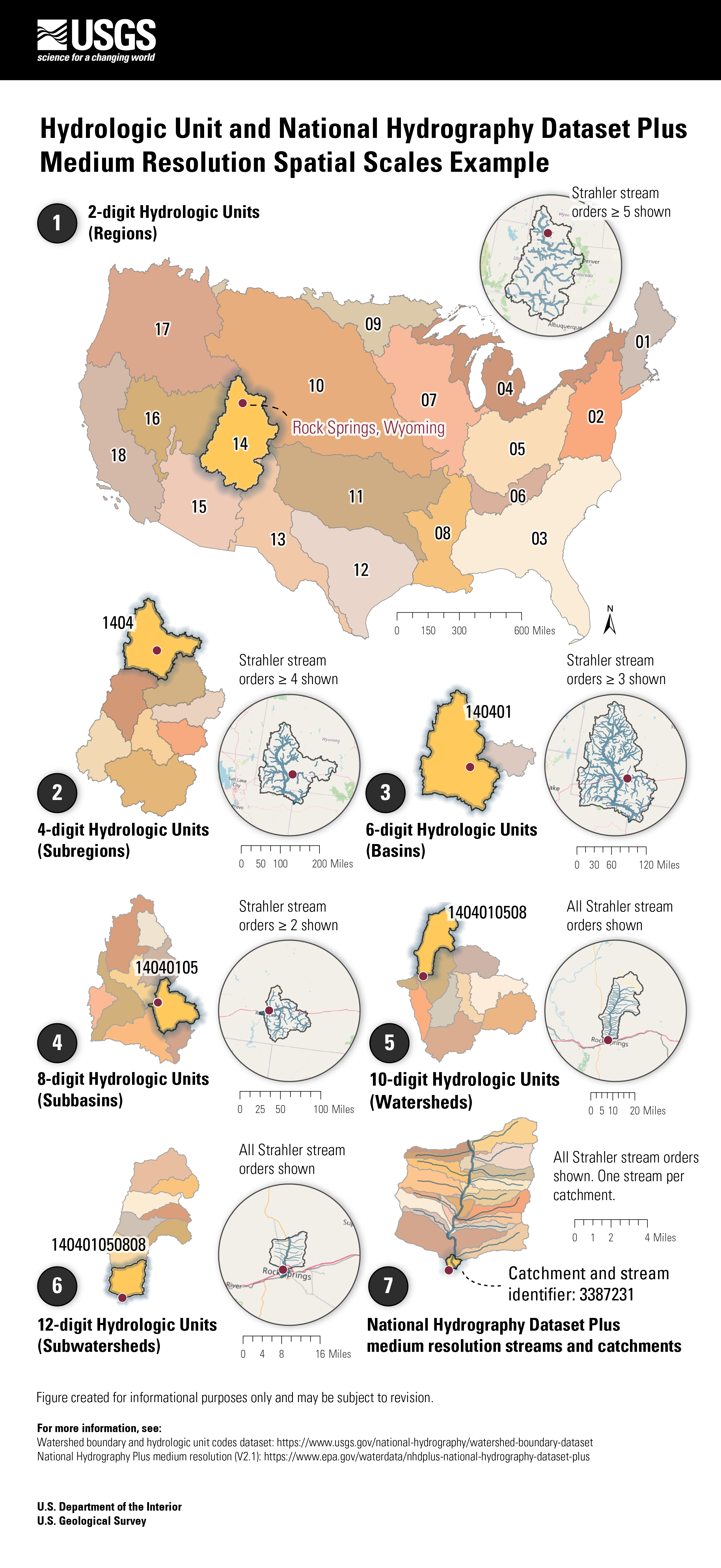
Infographic explaining the hierarchy of the United States hydrologic unit system

Originally a four-tier system divided into regions, sub-regions, accounting units, and cataloging units, each unit was assigned a unique Hydrologic Unit Code (HUC). As first implemented the system had 21 regions, 221 subregions, 378 accounting units, and 2,264 cataloging units. Over time the system was changed and expanded. As of 2010 there are six levels in the hierarchy, represented by hydrologic unit codes from 2 to 12 digits long, called regions, subregions, basins, subbasins, watersheds, and subwatersheds. The table below describes the system's hydrologic unit levels and their characteristics, along with example names and codes.

Name	Level	Digits	Average size (square miles)	Number of HUs (approximate)	Example name	Example code (HUC)
Region	1	2	177,560	21	Pacific Northwest	17
Subregion	2	4	16,800	222	Lower Snake	1706
Basin	3	6	10,596	370	Lower Snake	170601
Subbasin	4	8	700	2,200	Imnaha River	17060102
Watershed	5	10	227 (40,000–250,000 acres)	22,000	Upper Imnaha River	1706010201
Subwatershed	6	12	40 (10,000–40,000 acres)	160,000	North Fork Imnaha River	170601020101

The original delineation of units, down to subbasins (cataloging units), was done using 1:250,000 scale maps and data. The newer delineation work on watersheds and subwatersheds was done using 1:24,000 scale maps and data. As a result, the subbasin boundaries were changed and adjusted in order to conform to the higher resolution watersheds within them. Changes to subbasin boundaries resulted in changes in area sizes. Therefore, older data using "cataloging units" may differ from newer, higher resolution data using "subbasins".

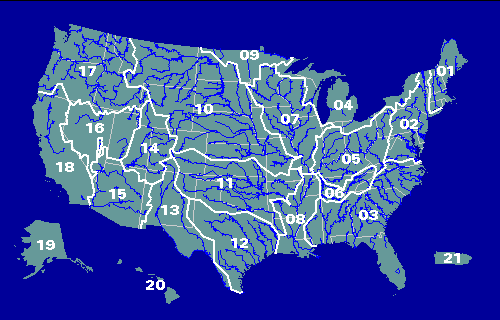
Top-level 2-digit region hydrologic unit boundaries: 01 New England, 02 Mid Atlantic, 03 South Atlantic Gulf, 04 Great Lakes, 05 Ohio, 06 Tennessee, 07 Upper Mississippi, 08 Lower Mississippi, 09 Souris-Red-Rainy, 10 Missouri, 11 Arkansas-White-Red, 12 Texas-Gulf, 13 Rio Grande, 14 Upper Colorado, 15 Lower Colorado, 16 Great Basin, 17 Pacific Northwest, 18 California, 19 Alaska, 20 Hawaii, 21 Caribbean.

The regions (1st level hydrologic units) are geographic areas that contain either the drainage area of a major river, such as the Missouri region, or the combined drainage areas of a series of rivers, such as the Texas–Gulf region. Each subregion includes the area drained by a river system, a reach of a river and its tributaries in that reach, a closed basin or basins, or a group of streams forming a coastal drainage area. Regions receive a two-digit code. The following levels are designated by the addition of another two digits.

The hierarchy was designed and the units subdivided so that almost all the subbasins (formerly called cataloging units) are larger than 700 square miles (1,800 km^{2}). Larger closed basins were subdivided until their subunits were less than 700 square miles. The 10-digit watersheds were delineated to be between 40,000 and 250,000 acres in size, and the 12-digit subwatersheds between 10,000 and 40,000 acres. In addition to the hydrologic unit codes, each hydrologic unit was assigned a name corresponding to the unit's principal hydrologic feature or to a cultural or political feature within the unit. The boundaries of the hydrologic units usually correspond to drainage basins with some exceptions; for example, subregion 1711, called "Puget Sound", includes all U.S. drainage into not only Puget Sound but also the Strait of Georgia, Strait of Juan de Fuca, and the Fraser River. Also, region and subregion boundaries end at the U.S. international boundary.

The various subdivisions of this system are not necessarily synonymous with watersheds for a number of reasons. As one analysis put it: "The hydrologic unit framework is in fact composed mostly of watersheds and pieces of watersheds. The pieces include units that drain to segments of streams, remnant areas, noncontributing areas, and coastal or frontal units that can include multiple watersheds draining to an ocean or large lake. Hence, half or more of the hydrologic units are not watersheds as the name of the framework Watershed Boundary Dataset (WBD) implies. Nonetheless, hydrologic units and watersheds are commonly treated as synonymous, and this misapplication and misunderstanding can have some serious scientific and management consequences."

Aquifers of the United States are organized by national principal aquifer codes and names assigned by the National Water Information System (NWIS). Aquifers are identified by a geohydrologic unit code (a three-digit number related to the age of the formation) followed by a 4 or 5 character abbreviation for the geologic unit or aquifer name.

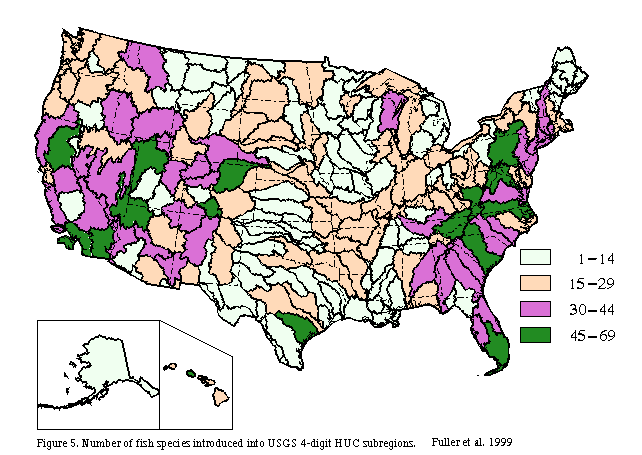
Water resource subregions (4-digit codes)

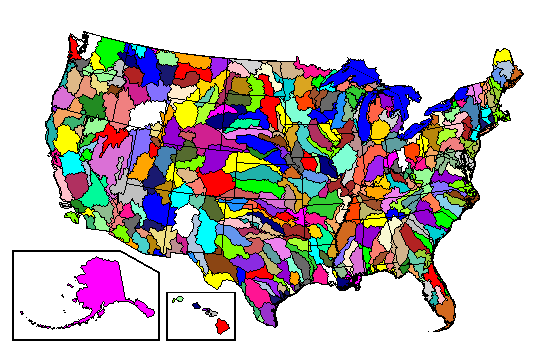
Water resource basins (6-digit codes)

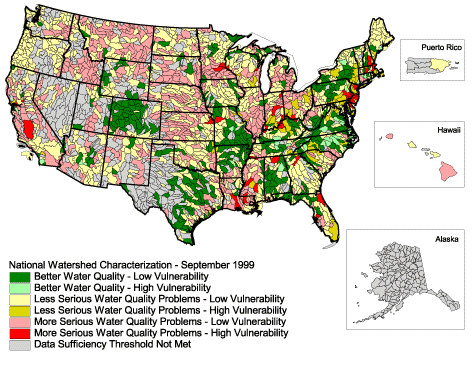
Water resource subbasins (8-digit codes)

== See also ==
- Water resource region § List of water resource regions
- Public land survey system
