= Mississippi Headwaters water resource subregion =

Second-level USGS hydrologic unit system subdivision

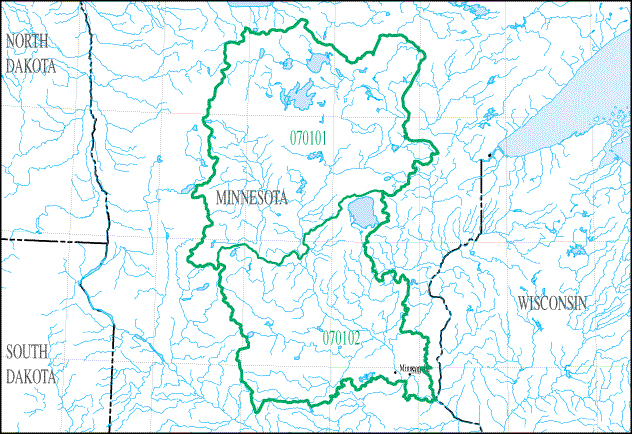
Water resource basins of the Mississippi Headwaters subregion (HUC 0701)

Mississippi Headwaters water resource subregion (HUC 0701) is one of 14 hydrologic subregions within the Upper Mississippi water resource region and is one of 222 water resource subregions in the United States hydrologic unit system. The Mississippi Headwaters subregion, sometimes called the Mississippi Headwaters Hydrologic Subregion, is a second-level subdivision covering approximately 20,200 sq mi (52,000 km^{2}) and includes the Mississippi River basin above the confluence with the St. Croix River basin, excluding the Minnesota River basin. The Mississippi Headwaters Subregion is composed of two third-level hydrological units.
