= Pfafstetter Coding System =

The Pfafstetter Coding System is a hierarchical method of hydrologically coding river basins. It was developed by the Brazilian engineer Otto Pfafstetter in 1989. It is designed such that topological information is embedded in the code, which makes it easy to determine whether an event in one river basin will affect another by direct examination of their codes.

== History and use ==
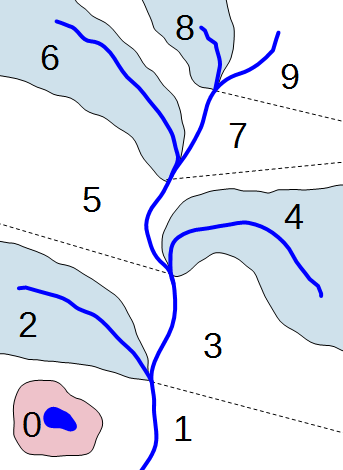
An example of a river system coded with the Pfafstetter coding system. The main tributary water basins are coded with even numbers 2-8, and the inter-basin regions with odd numbers. The code 0 is reserved for basins unconnected to the main stem.

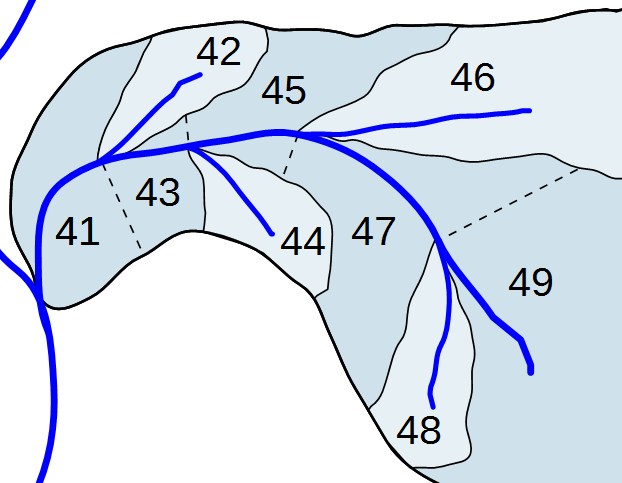
Coding continues recursively, with each new digit appended to the previously obtained code

In the 1950s, Pfafstetter suggested the use of a hierarchical system of coding river basins, later described in a 1989 paper. The method was applied to Brazilian water networks, and has been used in a number of other applications.

== Description ==
The Pfafstetter system relies on the properties of the base-10 numbering system. In a water system to be coded, the main stem is defined as the path which drains the greatest area. The four major tributaries, in terms of water drainage, of the main stem are determined, and the water basin of each defined. This results in four tributary basins, as well as five inter-basin regions which are drained by the main stem.

Each region is then numbered from 1-9, with the downstream-most inter-basin region denoted 1; therefore, the inter-basin regions and tributary basins are numbered 1,3,5,7,9 and 2,4,6,8 respectively. The number 0 is reserved for closed drainage systems.

Each tributary basin is then coded in an identical manner, and the resulting number appended to the end of the tributary basin number. In this manner, the entire waterway may be coded in a recursive manner to an arbitrary precision.

== Properties ==
The primary advantage of the Pfafstetter system is that the water drainage topology is directly described by the code:

- At each level, higher digits denote upstream segments.
- Odd digits denote segments on the main stem; even digits denote tributaries of the main stem.

Therefore, given a point with code A on the water system, a point with code B is downstream if:

- The first exactly n digits of each code match, where n ≥ 0, AND
- The remaining digits of B are:
  - less than the remaining digits of A, AND
  - all odd.

For example, segment 8835 is upstream of segments 8833 and 8811, but not segments 8832, 8821 or 9135.

The Pfaffstetter system is a particularly efficient system; n-digit codes can be used in a water system with 10^{n} segments. It compares favourably in this respect to the USGS HUC method.

== See also ==
- Hydrological code
- Strahler number
- Water Resource Region
