= Trout Lake Township =

Trout Lake Township may refer to:

- Trout Lake Township, Chippewa County, Michigan
- Trout Lake Township, Itasca County, Minnesota
