= Ohio water resource region =

US hydrologic region

The Ohio water resource region is one of 21 major geographic areas, or regions, in the first level of classification used by the United States Geological Survey to divide and sub-divide the United States into successively smaller hydrologic units. These geographic areas contain either the drainage area of a major river, or the combined drainage areas of a series of rivers.

The Ohio region, which is listed with a 2-digit hydrologic unit code (HUC) of 05, has an approximate size of 162,916 square miles (421,950 square kilometers), and consists of 14 subregions, which are listed with the 4-digit HUCs 0501 through 0514.

This region includes the drainage of the Ohio River Basin, excluding the Tennessee River Basin. Includes parts of Illinois, Indiana, Kentucky, Maryland, New York, North Carolina, Ohio, Pennsylvania, Tennessee, Virginia and West Virginia.

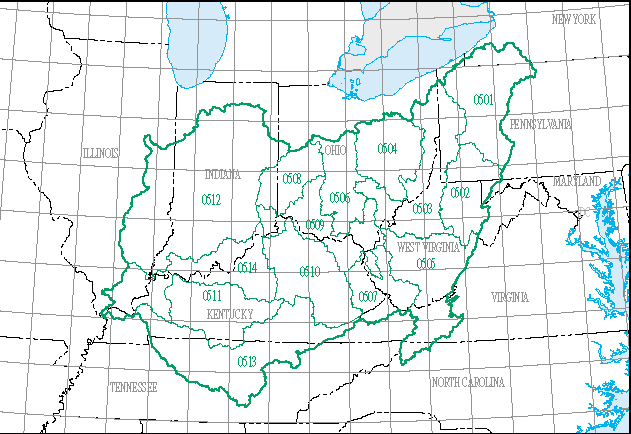
The Ohio region, with its 14 4-digit sub-region hydrologic unit boundaries.

== List of water resource subregions ==
Subregion HUC	Subregion Name	Subregion Description	Subregion Location	Subregion Size	Subregion Map
0501	Allegheny Subregion Subregion	The Allegheny River Basin.	Pennsylvania and New York.	11,600 sq mi (30,000 km^{2})	HUC0501
0502	Monongahela Subregion Subregion	The Monongahela River Basin.	Maryland, Pennsylvania, and West Virginia.	7,310 sq mi (18,900 km^{2})	HUC0502
0503	Upper Ohio Subregion Subregion	The Ohio River Basin below the confluence of the Allegheny and Monongahela River Basins to the confluence with the Kanawha River Basin, excluding the Muskingum River Basin.	Ohio, Pennsylvania, and West Virginia.	13,200 sq mi (34,000 km^{2})	HUC0503
0504	Muskingum Subregion Subregion	The Muskingum River Basin.	Ohio	7,980 sq mi (20,700 km^{2})	HUC0504
0505	Kanawha Subregion Subregion	The Kanawha River Basin.	North Carolina, Virginia, and West Virginia.	12,200 sq mi (32,000 km^{2})	HUC0505
0506	Scioto Subregion Subregion	The Scioto River Basin.	Ohio	6,440 sq mi (16,700 km^{2})	HUC0506
0507	Big Sandy–Guyandotte Subregion Subregion	The Big Sandy and Guyandotte River Basins.	Kentucky, Virginia, and West Virginia.	5,900 sq mi (15,000 km^{2})	HUC0507
0508	Great Miami Subregion Subregion	The Great Miami River Basin.	Indiana and Ohio.	5,330 sq mi (13,800 km^{2})	HUC0508
0509	Middle Ohio Subregion Subregion	The Ohio River Basin below the confluence with the Kanawha River Basin to the confluence with the Kentucky River Basin, excluding the Big Sandy, Great Miami, Guyandotte, Kentucky, Licking and Scioto River Basins.	Indiana, Kentucky, Ohio, and West Virginia.	8,850 sq mi (22,900 km^{2})	HUC0509
0510	Kentucky–Licking Subregion Subregion	The Licking and Kentucky River Basins.	Kentucky	10,500 sq mi (27,000 km^{2})	HUC0510
0511	Green Subregion Subregion	The Green River Basin.	Kentucky and Tennessee.	9,140 sq mi (23,700 km^{2})	HUC0511
0512	Wabash Subregion Subregion	The Wabash River Basin.	Illinois, Indiana, and Ohio.	32,600 sq mi (84,000 km^{2})	HUC0512
0513	Cumberland Subregion Subregion	The Cumberland River Basin.	Kentucky and Tennessee.	17,700 sq mi (46,000 km^{2})	HUC0513
0514	Lower Ohio Subregion Subregion	The Ohio River Basin below the confluence with the Kentucky River Basin, to the confluence with the Mississippi River, excluding the Cumberland, Green, Tennessee, and Wabash River Basins.	Illinois, Indiana, and Kentucky.	12,500 sq mi (32,000 km^{2})	HUC0514

== See also ==
- List of rivers in the United States
- Water resource region
