= Arkansas–White–Red water resource region =

US hydrologic region

The Arkansas–White–Red water resource region is one of 21 major geographic areas, or regions, in the first level of classification used by the United States Geological Survey to divide and sub-divide the United States into successively smaller hydrologic units. These geographic areas contain either the drainage area of a major river, or the combined drainage areas of a series of rivers.

The Arkansas–White–Red region, which is listed with a 2-digit hydrologic unit code (HUC) of 11, has an approximate size of 247,988 square miles (642,290 square kilometers), and consists of 14 subregions, which are listed with the 4-digit HUCs 1101 through 1114.

This region includes the drainage of the Arkansas, White, and Red River Basins above the points of highest backwater effect of the Mississippi River. Includes all of Oklahoma and parts of Arkansas, Colorado, Kansas, Louisiana, Missouri, New Mexico, and Texas.

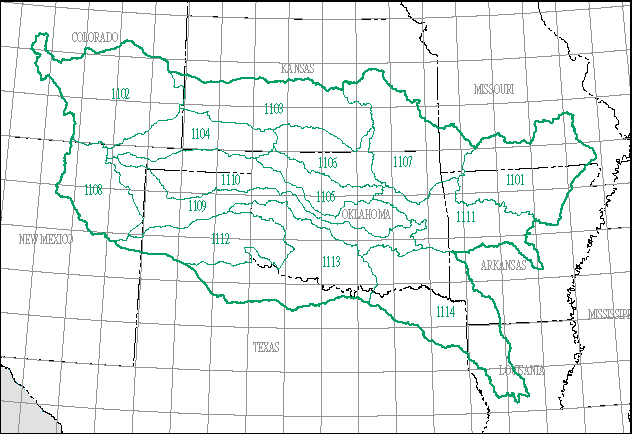
The Arkansas-White-Red region, with its 14 4-digit subregion hydrologic unit boundaries.

== List of water resource subregions ==
Subregion HUC	Subregion Name	Subregion Description	Subregion Location	Subregion Size	Subregion Map
1101	Upper White subregion	The White River Basin above and including the Little Red River Basin to the point of highest backwater effect of the Mississippi River.	Arkansas and Missouri.	22,200 sq mi (57,000 km^{2})	HUC1101
1102	Upper Arkansas subregion	The Arkansas River Basin above Its intersect with the Colorado-Kansas state Line.	Colorado, Kansas, and New Mexico.	24,600 sq mi (64,000 km^{2})	HUC1102
1103	Middle Arkansas subregion	The Arkansas River Basin below its intersect with the Colorado-Kansas state line to and including the Walnut River Basin, including the Whitewoman Creek closed basin.	Colorado and Kansas.	20,200 sq mi (52,000 km^{2})	HUC1103
1104	Upper Cimarron subregion	The Cimarron River Basin from its headwaters to the river's most downstream intersect with the Kansas-Oklahoma state line, including the Bear Creek closed basin.	Colorado, Kansas, New Mexico, and Oklahoma.	12,000 sq mi (31,000 km^{2})	HUC1104
1105	Lower Cimarron subregion	The Cimarron River Basin below the river's most downstream intersect with the Kansas-Oklahoma state line to the confluence with the Arkansas River, including that portion inundated by Keystone Reservoir.	Kansas and Oklahoma.	7,050 sq mi (18,300 km^{2})	HUC1105
1106	Arkansas–Keystone subregion	The Arkansas River Basin below the Walnut River Basin to Keystone Dam, excluding the Cimarron River Basin.	Kansas and Oklahoma.	9,750 sq mi (25,300 km^{2})	HUC1106
1107	Neosho–Verdigris subregion	The Neosho and Verdigris River Basins.	Arkansas, Kansas, Missouri, and Oklahoma.	20,500 sq mi (53,000 km^{2})	HUC1107
1108	Upper Canadian subregion	The Canadian River Basin above its intersect with the New Mexico-Texas state line.	Colorado and New Mexico.	12,500 sq mi (32,000 km^{2})	HUC1108
1109	Lower Canadian subregion	The Canadian River Basin below its intersect with the New Mexico-Texas state line to the confluence with the Arkansas River, including that portion inundated by Eufaula Lake and Robert S. Kerr Reservoir, but excluding the North Canadian River Basin.	New Mexico, Oklahoma, and Texas.	16,800 sq mi (44,000 km^{2})	HUC1109
1110	North Canadian subregion	The North Canadian River Basin, including that portion inundated by Eufaula Lake.	Kansas, New Mexico, Oklahoma, and Texas.	17,500 sq mi (45,000 km^{2})	HUC1110
1111	Lower Arkansas subregion	The Arkansas River Basin below Keystone Dam to the point of highest backwater effect of the Mississippi River below Lock and Dam 4 on the Arkansas River, but excluding the Canadian, Neosho, and Verdigris River Basins.	Arkansas and Oklahoma.	15,600 sq mi (40,000 km^{2})	HUC1111
1112	Red headwaters subregion	The North Fork Red River, Prairie Dog Town Fork Red River, and the Salt Fork Red River Basins.	New Mexico, Oklahoma, and Texas.	14,600 sq mi (38,000 km^{2})	HUC1112
1113	Red–Washita subregion	The Red River Basin above Denison Dam, excluding the North Fork Red River, Prairie Dog Town Fork Red River, and the Salt Fork Red River Basins.	Oklahoma and Texas.	24,600 sq mi (64,000 km^{2})	HUC1113
1114	Red–Sulphur subregion	The Red River Basin below Denison Dam to and including the Bayou Rigolette Basin at the point of highest backwater effect of the Mississippi River.	Arkansas, Louisiana, Oklahoma, and Texas.	27,600 sq mi (71,000 km^{2})	HUC1114

== See also ==
- List of rivers in the United States
- Water resource region
