= Trout Lake Township, Itasca County, Minnesota =

Trout Lake Township, Minnesota
- Township
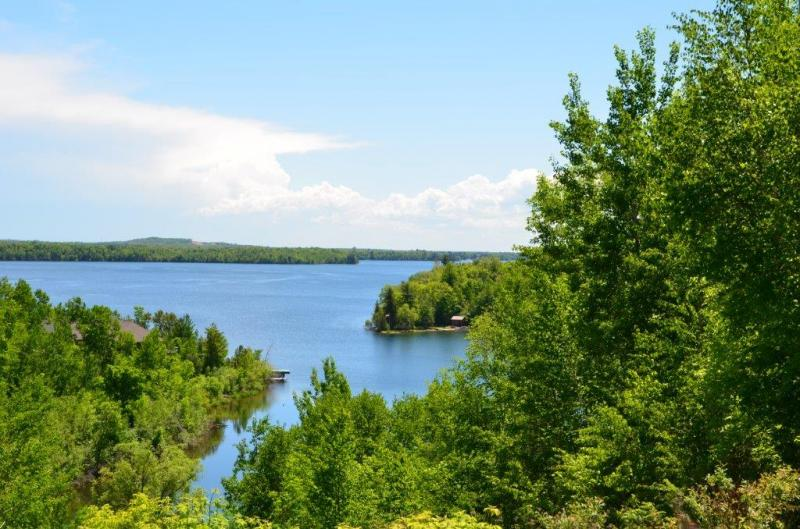
- Overview of Trout Lake Township's largest lake: Trout Lake.

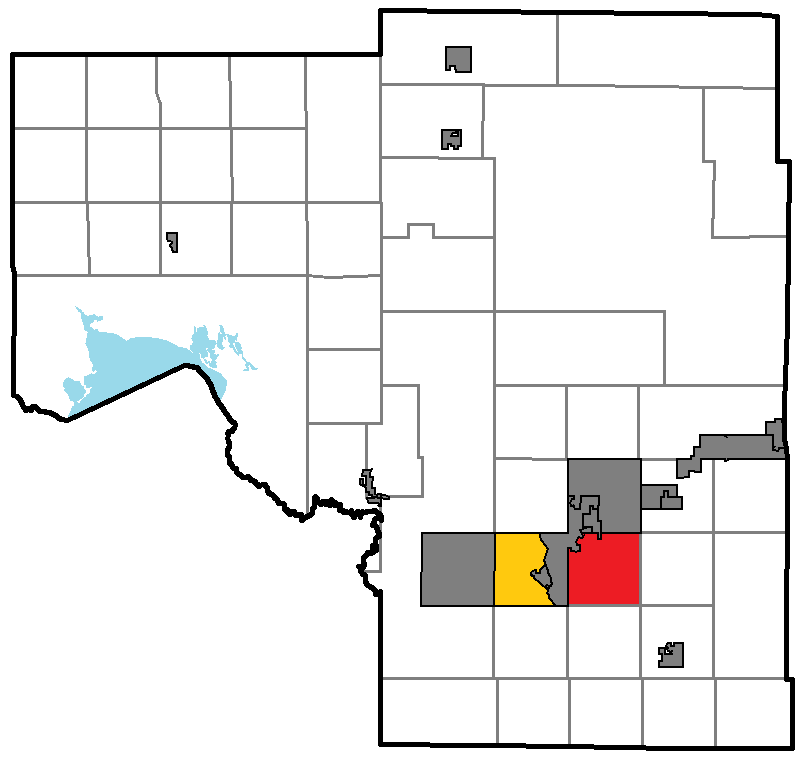
- Location of Trout Lake Township, within Itasca County, Minnesota
- Coordinates: 47°14′0″N 93°22′27″W
- Country: United States
- State: Minnesota
- County: Itasca

Area
  - Total: 34.7 sq mi (89.8 km^{2})
  - Land: 30.5 sq mi (79.1 km^{2})
  - Water: 4.1 sq mi (10.7 km^{2})
- Elevation: 1,289 ft (393 m)

Population (2020)
  - Total: 1,056
  - Density: 34.6/sq mi (13.4/km^{2})
- Time zone: UTC-6 (Central (CST))
  - Summer (DST): UTC-5 (CDT)
- FIPS code: 27-65596
- GNIS feature ID: 0665811
- Website: https://troutlakemn.gov/

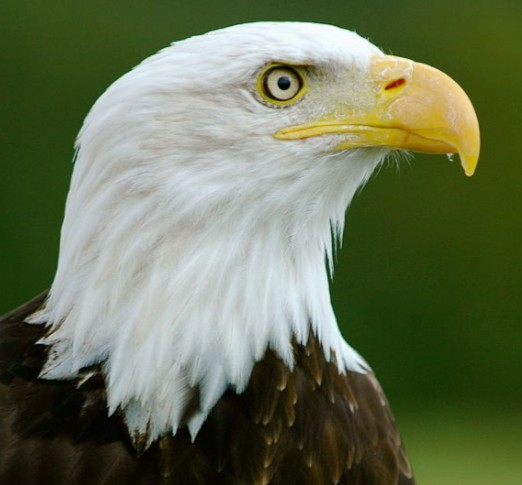
Home of Minnesota's longest recorded eagle nesting site; since 1948

Trout Lake Township is located in north central Minnesota in Itasca County, United States. It is bordered by the City of Coleraine to the west and north, City of Bovey on the north, an unorganized township on the east, and Blackberry Township to the south. Town government was adopted on March 6, 1894. The population was 1,056 at the 2020 census.

== Geography ==
In 1870, Trout Lake Township, or 55 N Range 24 W of the 4th PM (principal meridian), was surveyed as part of the Public Land Survey System. According to the United States Census Bureau, the township has a total area of 34.7 square miles (89.8 km^{2}), of which 30.5 square miles (79.1 km^{2}) is land and 4.1 square miles (10.7 km^{2}), or 11.91%, is water. The Swan River and several lakes are within the township of which Trout Lake is the largest at 1862.08 acres with a maximum depth of 135 feet. The land sits in the Laurentian Mixed Forest Province, defined by a mixture of deciduous and coniferous forests. It is on top of the western portion of the Mesabi Iron Range.

== Natural resources ==
=== Timber ===
Logging in Trout Lake Township corresponds with the exhibits and re-enactments at the Minnesota Forest History Center, a site just 10 miles distant. The 1890s to 1910 was the "golden era" of lumbering in Minnesota. According to local interviews archived at the Iron Range Research Center, there were logging camps in the township. Settlers worked to provide railroad ties.

Today, private landowners are encouraged to manage the forest through organizations such as the Minnesota Forestry Association, and to enroll in Woodland Stewardship Plans. Itasca County, certified by the Forest Stewardship Council, manages tax forfeited public properties in Trout Lake Township for timber; cover type aspen-birch.

=== Iron ore ===
Iron ore was processed into taconite at the Trout Lake Washing and Concentrator Plant, 1907-1970. The plant, and the adjacent Trout Lake, provided it with a convenient location to deposit its tailings, which were pumped into the lake for nearly three decades.

The Oliver Iron Mining Company's concentrator plant, its power station on the lake, and the workers' Bugaloosa location, are now gone. The history continues to qualify Trout Lake Township for Taconite Assistance and Tax Relief, and for benefits from the Iron Range Resources and Rehabilitation Board.

=== Water ===
The natural water system is in the Prairie-Willow Subbasin, of the Mississippi Headwaters Basin, within the Upper Mississippi Region. It is in Supervisor District 4 of the Itasca County Soil and Water Conservation District. Besides several creeks and Swan River, there are seven protected lakes. Each has a distinguishing number in the state’s identification system. The lakes are:

- #310206 Mud at 69.67 acres with a maximum depth of 5 feet
- #310207 Bass at 100 acres with 16 feet maximum
- #310208 Sampson at 17.24 acres (depth unknown)
- #310209 Round at 100.61 acres with 16 feet maximum
- #310210 Blackberry at 254 acres with 20 feet maximum
- #310214 Clearwater at 131.59 acres with 16 feet maximum
- #310216 Trout at 1862.08 with 135 feet maximum

Bass, Clearwater, and Round lakes are classified by Itasca County as "phosphorus sensitive lakes". Blackberry and Mud lakes are on the state's inventory for wild rice. Trout lake has not had trout species since the 1940s. It is classified as a Cisco Refuge Lake because it has deep, cold water.

The state maintains a boat landing on the southeast end of Trout Lake. It adjoins a campground that was previously a public park. Historically, the park was for company picnics of the Oliver Mining Company. It transferred to Greenway Lions Club and developed into Kom-On-In Beach and Recreation Area with the aid of Iron Range Resources and Rehabilitation Board. After approximately half a century, the property was sold and is now Trout Lake RV Park and Campground.

=== Wildlife ===
Fishing, hunting and trapping are regulated by federal and state laws, managed by the Minnesota Department of Natural Resources (MN DNR), and enforced by MN DNR conservation officers and Itasca County Sheriff's Department.

Alder Pond Ruffed Grouse Management Area and recreation trail system are on 190 acres located between town sections 29 and 32. It is managed by Itasca County, with Grand Rapids Ruffed Grouse Society and MN DNR as partners. The public trails are used for hiking, horseback riding, and hunting, plus 6.03 miles are groomed by Northern Lights Nordic Ski Club for cross-country skiing.

Trout Lake Eagle Wildlife Management Area preserves three eagle nests and several potential white pine nesting trees. The area is one of the longest known bald eagle nesting sites in Minnesota. Two parcels of undeveloped land (located on opposite sides of Trout Lake) were purchased by a joint effort of MN DNR Nongame Wildlife Program, Reinvest In Minnesota (RIM) and the Nature Conservancy.

== Community ==
=== Demographics ===
The Minnesota State Demographic Center estimated the 2019 population of Trout Lake Township at 1093 people in 455 households. The 2020 US Census found the population at 1056 in 491 households. 5.4% were below the poverty level in 2020 compared to 11.5% the year before the US 2010 census. The residents of Trout Lake Township are 98.6% white. When the United States 2010 census was taken, none had been born outside of the country, and 80% had been born in Minnesota. 20.6% of the people within the marrying age (ages 15 and over) had never been married. 25.2% of residents ages 25 and over had some college or an associate's degree.

=== Town government ===
The settlers in the geographic township of Trout Lake, on March 6, 1894, organized themselves into a political township. The township became a public corporation, according to Minn. Stat. § 365.02, with governing authority granted by the state legislature. The first supervisors were N. Washburn, C.S. Brock, and August Keihta; clerk F.H. Webster; and treasurer, Robert Smith. Their first priority was building roads.

With town government, residents decide at the annual town meeting, held on the second Tuesday of March, what the town levy will be, and to approve actions to be taken by the town board. The residents may also call special town meetings to address concerns. The Trout Lake town board meets at least monthly to oversee over 20 miles of township roads, two cemeteries, and a community center on ten acres with a playground, pavilion, and ball field. The town supervisors also represent the community on county committees, and joint powers associations. Trout Lake is also a voting precinct and administers a polling place at the Trout Lake Community Center.

=== Basic rural services ===
9-1-1 emergency calls are directed to the appropriate agency for help. Trout Lake Township is patrolled by Itasca County Sheriff's Department. The town contracts with both Trout Lake Fire Department and Grand Rapids Fire Department. The majority of rural mail delivery is provided by the US Post Office in Bovey, and a southern portion, by the US Post Office in Grand Rapids; hence mailing addresses are zip codes 55709 or 55744 respectively. The community is connected by a network of county and township roads. The main thoroughfares are Trout Lake Road (#21), County Road 10, and County Road 71.

The rural community of Trout Lake supports the economic and social infrastructure of its surrounding cities. There are not any active schoolhouses, churches, stores, or industries in the township. The township is within these service areas for amenities:

- Electricity from Lake Country Power, a Touchstone Energy Cooperative that purchases electricity from Great River Energy.
- Broadband from Paul Bunyan Communications, a telecommunication cooperative, that offers optic fiber internet connection to every house.
- Public transportation from Arrowhead Transit.
- Public education from Greenway School System #316, Grand Rapids School System #318, Itasca Area Community Education, and the Arrowhead Public Library System.
- Public healthcare, home-care, and social services are administered by Itasca County Public Health, Elder Circle, and Kootasca Community Action.
