= Texas–Gulf water resource region =

US hydrologic region

The Texas–Gulf water resource region is one of 21 major geographic areas, or regions, in the first level of classification used by the United States Geological Survey to divide and sub-divide the United States into successively smaller hydrologic units. These geographic areas contain either the drainage area of a major river, or the combined drainage areas of a series of rivers.

The Texas–Gulf region, which is listed with a 2-digit hydrologic unit code (HUC) of 12, has an approximate size of 181,886 square miles (471,080 square kilometers), and consists of 11 subregions, which are listed with the 4-digit HUCs 1201 through 1211.

This region includes The drainage that discharges into the Gulf of Mexico from and including Sabine Pass to the Rio Grande Basin boundary. Includes parts of Louisiana, New Mexico, and Texas.

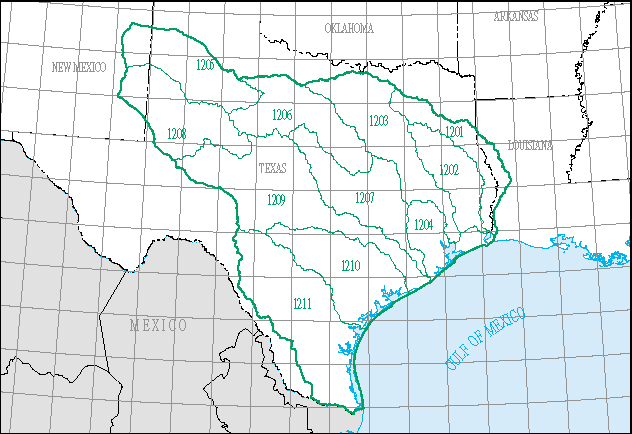
The Texas-Gulf region, with its 14 4-digit subregion hydrologic unit boundaries.

== List of water resource subregions ==
Subregion HUC	Subregion Name	Subregion Description	Subregion Location	Subregion Size	Subregion Map
1201	Sabine subregion	The Sabine River Basin above Sabine Lake.	Louisiana and Texas.	9,860 sq mi (25,500 km^{2})	HUC1201
1202	Neches subregion	The Neches River Basin above Sabine Lake.	Texas.	10,000 sq mi (26,000 km^{2})	HUC1202
1203	Trinity subregion	The Trinity River Basin above Trinity Bay.	Texas.	18,000 sq mi (47,000 km^{2})	HUC1203
1204	Galveston Bay–San Jacinto subregion	The coastal drainage and associated waters from and including Sabine Pass to the Brazos River Basin boundary, but excluding the Neches and Sabine River Basins above Sabine Lake and the Trinity River Basin above Trinity Bay.	Louisiana and Texas.	7,980 sq mi (20,700 km^{2})	HUC1204
1205	Brazos headwaters subregion	The Brazos River Basin above the confluence of and including the Double Mountain Fork Brazos River and the Salt Fork Brazos River Basins.	New Mexico and Texas.	14,600 sq mi (38,000 km^{2})	HUC1205
1206	Middle Brazos subregion	The Brazos River Basin below the confluence of the Double Mountain Fork Brazos River and the Salt Fork Brazos River Basins to and including the Castleman Creek Basin.	Texas.	15,500 sq mi (40,000 km^{2})	HUC1206
1207	Lower Brazos subregion	The Brazos River Basin below the Castleman Creek Basin.	Texas.	15,600 sq mi (40,000 km^{2})	HUC1207
1208	Upper Colorado subregion	The Colorado River Basin above and including the Oak Creek Basin.	New Mexico and Texas.	16,000 sq mi (41,000 km^{2})	HUC1208
1209	Lower Colorado–San Bernard Coastal subregion	The Colorado River Basin below the Oak Creek Basin; and the Coastal drainage and associated waters from the Brazos River Basin boundary to the Colorado River Basin boundary.	Texas.	28,400 sq mi (74,000 km^{2})	HUC1209
1210	Central Texas Coastal subregion	The coastal drainage and associated waters from the Colorado River Basin boundary to Aransas Pass and the Corpus Christi Bay drainage boundary.	Texas.	18,200 sq mi (47,000 km^{2})	HUC1210
1211	Nueces–Southwestern Texas Coastal subregion	The coastal drainage and associated waters from Aransas Pass, including the Corpus Christi Bay and Nueces River drainages, to the Rio Grande Basin boundary.	Texas.	29,000 sq mi (75,000 km^{2})	HUC1211

== See also ==
- List of rivers in the United States
- Water resource region
