= Alaska water resource region =

US hydrologic region

The Alaska water resource region is one of 21 major geographic areas, or regions, in the first level of classification used by the United States Geological Survey to divide and sub-divide the United States into successively smaller hydrologic units. These geographic areas contain either the drainage area of a major river, or the combined drainage areas of a series of rivers.

The Alaska region, which is listed with a 2-digit hydrologic unit code (HUC) of 19, has an approximate size of 720,535 square miles (1,866,180 square kilometers), and consists of 6 subregions, which are listed with the 4-digit HUCs 1901 through 1906.

This region includes the drainage within the state of Alaska. Includes all of Alaska.

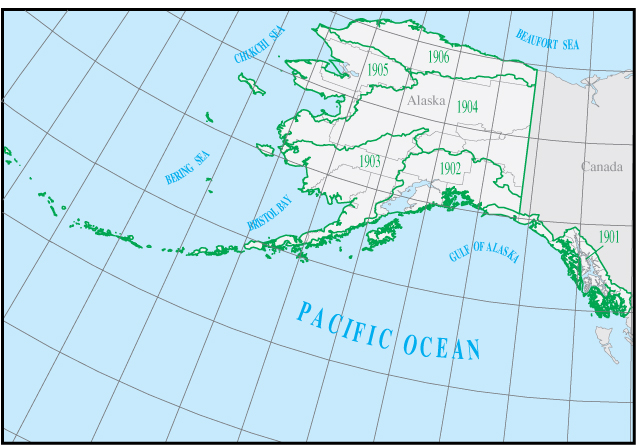
The Alaska region, with its six 4-digit subregion hydrologic unit boundaries.

== List of water resource subregions ==
| Subregion HUC | Subregion Name | Subregion Description | Subregion Location | Subregion Size | Subregion Map |
|---|---|---|---|---|---|
| 1901 | Arctic Slope subregion | The North Slope drainage within the United States that discharges into the Arctic Ocean, including the bays, islands, and associated waters, from the Alaska-Yukon international boundary to Cape Lisburne. | Alaska | 81,000 sq mi (210,000 km^{2}) | HUC1901 |
| 1902 | Northwest Alaska subregion | The coastal drainage from Cape Lisburne to the Yukon River Basin boundary, including the bays, sounds, islands, and associated waters; and St. Lawrence Island. | Alaska | 75,000 sq mi (190,000 km^{2}) | HUC1902 |
| 1903 | Yukon subregion | The Yukon River Basin within the United States, including its delta. | Alaska | 204,000 sq mi (530,000 km^{2}) | HUC1903 |
| 1904 | Southwest Alaska subregion | The coastal drainage from the Yukon River Basin boundary to Kupreanof Point on the Alaska Peninsula, including the bays, islands, and associated waters; and the islands of St. Matthew, Nunivak and Pribilof, and all of the Aleutian Islands. | Alaska | 124,000 sq mi (320,000 km^{2}) | HUC1904 |
| 1905 | South Central Alaska subregion | The coastal drainage within the United States from Kupreanof Point on the Alaska Peninsula to the Alaska-Yukon international boundary and southward to Point Riou, including the bays, islands, sounds, and associated waters. | Alaska | 99,000 sq mi (260,000 km^{2}) | HUC1905 |
| 1906 | Southeast Alaska subregion | The coastal drainage within the United States from Point Riou to the Alaska-British Columbia international boundary, including the bays, islands, sounds, and associated waters. | Alaska | 49,000 sq mi (130,000 km^{2}) | HUC1906 |

== See also ==
- List of rivers in the United States
- Water resource region
