= Caribbean water resource region =

US hydrologic region

The Caribbean water resource region is one of 21 major geographic areas, or regions, in the first level of classification used by the United States Geological Survey to divide and sub-divide the United States into successively smaller hydrologic units. These geographic areas contain either the drainage area of a major river, or the combined drainage areas of a series of rivers.

The Caribbean region, which is listed with a 2-digit hydrologic unit code (HUC) of 21, has an approximate size of 3,582 square miles (9,280 square kilometers), and consists of 3 subregions, which are listed with the 4-digit HUCs 2101 through 2103. This region includes the drainage within: (a) the Commonwealth of Puerto Rico; (b) the Virgin Islands of the United States; and (c) other United States Caribbean outlying areas. Includes Caribbean land areas over which the United States has some degree of interest, jurisdiction, or sovereignty.

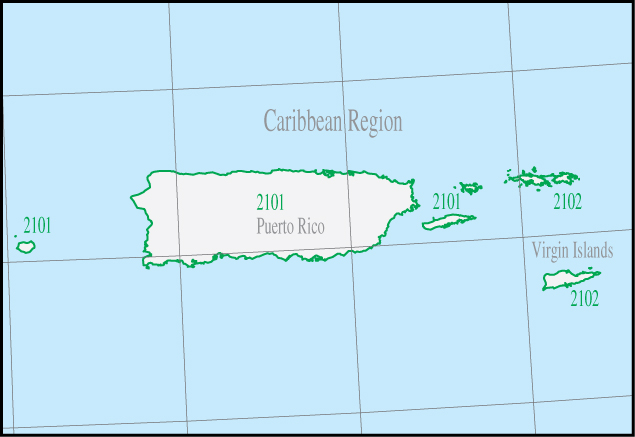
The Caribbean region, with two of its three 4-digit subregion hydrologic unit boundaries.

== List of water resource subregions ==
Subregion HUC	Subregion Name	Subregion Description	Subregion Location	Subregion Size	Subregion Map
2101	Puerto Rico subregion	The drainage and associated waters within the Commonwealth of Puerto Rico.	Puerto Rico	3,480 sq mi (9,000 km^{2})	HUC2101
2102	Virgin Islands subregion	The drainage and associated waters within the Virgin Islands of the United States.	U.S. Virgin Islands	133 sq mi (340 km^{2})	HUC2102
2103	Caribbean Outlying Areas subregion	The drainage and associated waters within the Canal Zone, Navassa Island, and Rancador and Serrana Banks.	Canal Zone, Navassa Island, and Rancador and Serrana Banks.	650 sq mi (1,700 km^{2})	

== See also ==
- List of rivers in the United States
- Water resource region
