= Lower Mississippi water resource region =

US hydrologic region

The Lower Mississippi water resource region is one of 21 major geographic areas, or regions, in the first level of classification used by the United States Geological Survey to divide and sub-divide the United States into successively smaller hydrologic units. These geographic areas contain either the drainage area of a major river, or the combined drainage areas of a series of rivers.

The Lower Mississippi region, which is listed with a 2-digit hydrologic unit code (HUC) of 08, has an approximate size of 106,741 square miles (276,460 square kilometers), and consists of 9 subregions, which are listed with the 4-digit HUCs 0801 through 0809.

This region includes the drainage within the United States of: (a) the Mississippi River below its confluence with the Ohio River, excluding the Arkansas, Red, and White River basins above the points of highest backwater effect of the Mississippi River in those basins; and (b) coastal streams that ultimately discharge into the Gulf of Mexico from the Pearl River Basin boundary to the Sabine River and Sabine Lake drainage boundary. Includes parts of Arkansas, Kentucky, Louisiana, Mississippi, Missouri, and Tennessee.

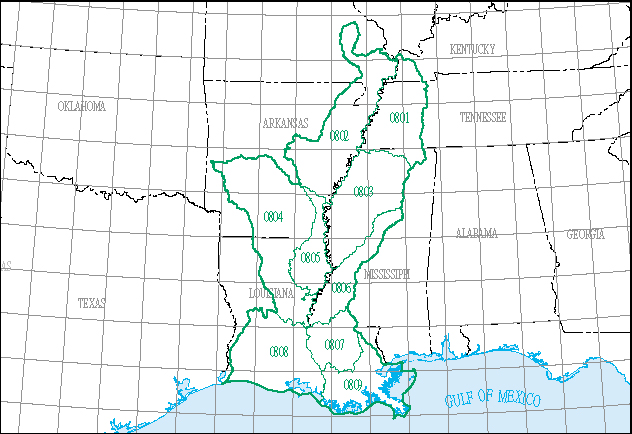
The Lower Mississippi region, with its 9 4-digit subregion hydrologic unit boundaries.

== List of water resource subregions ==
Subregion HUC	Subregion Name	Subregion Description	Subregion Location	Subregion Size	Subregion Map
0801	Lower Mississippi–Hatchie subregion	The Mississippi River Basin from the confluence of the Ohio River to and including the Horn Lake Creek Basin, but excluding the drainage west of the West-Bank Levee along the Mississippi River.	Arkansas, Kentucky, Mississippi, Missouri, and Tennessee.	11,000 sq mi (28,000 km^{2})	HUC0801
0802	Lower Mississippi–St. Francis subregion	The Mississippi River Basin from the Horn Lake Creek Basin on the east bank to and including the Arkansas and White River Basins below the points of highest backwater effect of the Mississippi River; excluding all drainage east of the East-Bank Levee below the Horn Lake Creek Basin.	Arkansas, Mississippi, and Missouri.	16,700 sq mi (43,000 km^{2})	HUC0802
0803	Lower Mississippi–Yazoo subregion	The Mississippi River Basin from the Arkansas River Basin to and including the Yazoo River Basin; excluding all drainage west of the West-Bank Levee below the Arkansas River Basin.	Arkansas, Louisiana, Mississippi, and Tennessee.	14,100 sq mi (37,000 km^{2})	HUC0803
0804	Lower Red–Ouachita subregion	The Red River Basin below the Bayou Rigolette Basin, excluding the Boeuf and Tensas River Basins.	Arkansas and Louisiana.	20,500 sq mi (53,000 km^{2})	HUC0804
0805	Boeuf–Tensas subregion	The Boeuf and Tensas River Basins.	Arkansas and Louisiana.	5,300 sq mi (14,000 km^{2})	HUC0805
0806	Lower Mississippi–Big Black subregion	The Mississippi River Basin from the Yazoo River Basin to the Lower Old River drainage boundary, but excluding all the drainage west of the West-Bank Levee along the Mississippi River.	Louisiana and Mississippi.	7,100 sq mi (18,000 km^{2})	HUC0806
0807	Lower Mississippi–Lake Maurepas subregion	The Mississippi River Basin from the Lower Old River drainage boundary to the Bonnet Carre Floodway, and including the Lower Grand River Basin west of the West-Bank Levee.	Louisiana and Mississippi.	5,870 sq mi (15,200 km^{2})	HUC0807
0808	Louisiana Coastal subregion	The Louisiana coastal drainage, including islands and associated waters, south of the Red River Basin boundary and west of the East-Bank Levee of the Atchafalaya Basin Floodway, to the Sabine River and Sabine Lake drainage boundary.	Louisiana	14,000 sq mi (36,000 km^{2})	HUC0808
0809	Lower Mississippi subregion	The Mississippi River below the Bonnet Carre Floodway, and the Coastal drainage, including islands and associated waters, from the Pearl River Basin boundary and the Mississippi-Louisiana state line to the East-Bank Levee of the Atchafalaya Basin Floodway, excluding the drainage from the north into Lake Pontchartrain, east to the Tchefuncta River drainage boundary; and excludingthe Lower Grand River Basin.	Louisiana	9,460 sq mi (24,500 km^{2})	HUC0809

== See also ==
- List of rivers in the United States
- Water resource region
