= Hydrologic Unit Modeling for the United States =

The HUMUS project (or Hydrologic Unit Modeling of the United States) is a project that was funded by the Natural Resources Conservation Service to model the non-point source loading from 8-digit hydrologic unit cataloging units.

== History ==
Most of the project activity took place from 1992–1996, and work continues to this day through the Conservation Effects Assessment Program (CEAP. The project was led within NRCS by Clive Walker. The modeling work used the Soil & Water Assessment Tool (SWAT) developed by Jeff Arnold, Jimmy Williams and others at USDA-Agricultural Research Service (ARS) in Temple, Texas. Additional development support was provided by the Texas A&M Blackland Research & Extension Service AgriLife Center employees Raghavan Srinivasan, Ranjan Muttiah, Paul Dyke, Allan Jones among others. Mike Hutchinson from the Australian National University was visiting the A&M center at that time and provided assistance with elevation data modeling. Peter Allen a hydro-geologist from Baylor University was instrumental in sub-surface shallow groundwater modeling. Significance of the project was the early use of national level Geographic Information Systems (GIS) datasets for environmental assessment.
