= Tennessee water resource region =

US hydrologic region

The Tennessee water resource region is one of 21 major geographic areas, or regions, in the first level of classification used by the United States Geological Survey to divide and sub-divide the United States into successively smaller hydrologic units. These geographic areas contain either the drainage area of a major river, or the combined drainage areas of a series of rivers.

The Tennessee region, which is listed with a 2-digit hydrologic unit code (HUC) of 06, has an approximate size of 40,908 square miles (105,950 square kilometers), and consists of 4 subregions, which are listed with the 4-digit HUCs 0601 through 0604.

This region includes the drainage of the Tennessee River Basin. Includes parts of Alabama, Georgia, Kentucky, Mississippi, North Carolina, Tennessee, and Virginia.

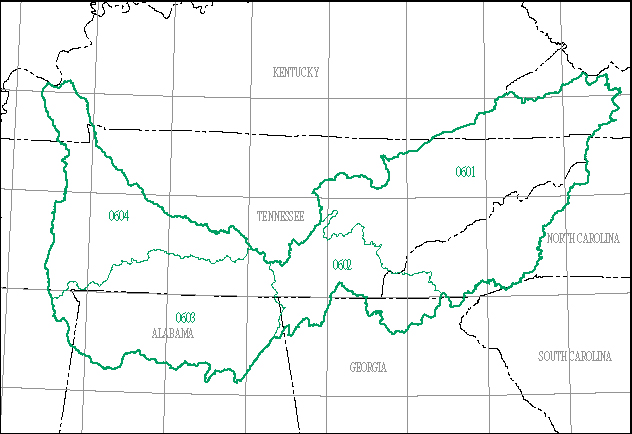
The Tennessee region, with its 4 4-digit sub-region hydrologic unit boundaries.

== List of water resource subregions ==
Subregion HUC	Subregion Name	Subregion Description	Subregion Location	Subregion Size	Subregion Map
0601	Upper Tennessee Subregion	The Tennessee River Basin above Watts Bar Dam.	Georgia, North Carolina, Tennessee, and Virginia.	17,200 sq mi (45,000 km^{2})	HUC0601
0602	Middle Tennessee-Hiwassee Subregion	The Tennessee River Basin below Watts Bar Dam to and including the Sequatchie River Basin.	Alabama, Georgia, North Carolina, and Tennessee.	5,160 sq mi (13,400 km^{2})	HUC0602
0603	Middle Tennessee-Elk Subregion	The Tennessee River Basin below the confluence with the Sequatchie River Basin to Pickwick Dam.	Alabama, Georgia, Mississippi, and Tennessee.	10,300 sq mi (27,000 km^{2})	HUC0603
0604	Lower Tennessee Subregion	The Tennessee River Basin below Pickwick Dam.	Kentucky, Mississippi, and Tennessee.	8,010 sq mi (20,700 km^{2})	HUC0604

== See also ==
- List of rivers in the United States
- Water Resource Region
