= Missouri water resource region =

US hydrologic region

The Missouri water resource region is one of 21 major geographic areas, or regions, in the first level of classification used by the United States Geological Survey to divide and sub-divide the United States into successively smaller hydrologic units. These geographic areas contain either the drainage area of a major river, or the combined drainage areas of a series of rivers.

The Missouri region, which is listed with a 2-digit hydrologic unit code (HUC) of 10, has an approximate size of 520,960 square miles (1,349,300 square kilometers), and consists of 30 sub-regions, which are listed with the 4-digit HUCs 1001 through 1030.

This region includes the drainage within the United States of: (a) the Missouri River Basin, (b) the Saskatchewan River Basin, and (c) several small closed basins. Includes all of Nebraska and parts of Colorado, Iowa, Kansas, Minnesota, Missouri, Montana, North Dakota, South Dakota, and Wyoming.

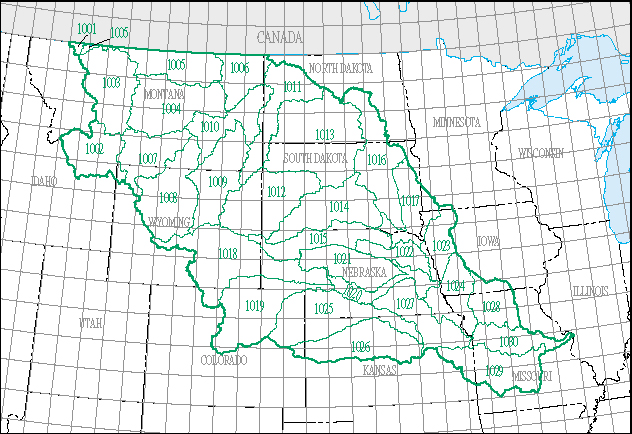
The Missouri region, with its 30 4-digit subregion hydrologic unit boundaries.

== List of water resource subregions ==
Subregion HUC	Subregion Name	Subregion Description	Subregion Location	Subregion Size	Subregion Map
1001	Saskatchewan subregion	The Saskatchewan River Basin within the United States.	Montana	0,697 sq mi (1,810 km^{2})	HUC1001
1002	Missouri Headwaters subregion	The Headwaters of the Missouri River Basin above the confluence of and including the Gallatin, Jefferson, and Madison River Basins.	Montana and Wyoming.	14,100 sq mi (37,000 km^{2})	HUC1002
1003	Missouri–Marias subregion	The Missouri River Basin below then confluence of the Gallatin, Jefferson, and Madison River Basins to and including the Marias River Basin.	Montana	20,100 sq mi (52,000 km^{2})	HUC1003
1004	Missouri–Musselshell subregion	The Missouri River Basin below the confluence of the Marias River Basin to Fort Peck Dam.	Montana	23,700 sq mi (61,000 km^{2})	HUC1004
1005	Milk subregion	The Milk River Basin within the United States, including the Wild Horse Lake closed basin.	Montana	15,300 sq mi (40,000 km^{2})	HUC1005
1006	Missouri–Poplar subregion	The Missouri River Basin within the United States from Fort Peck Dam to the confluence with the Yellowstone River Basin.	Montana	10,800 sq mi (28,000 km^{2})	HUC1006
1007	Upper Yellowstone subregion	The Yellowstone River Basin above the confluence with the Bighorn River Basin.	Montana and Wyoming.	14,400 sq mi (37,000 km^{2})	HUC1007
1008	Big Horn subregion	The Big Horn River Basin.	Montana and Wyoming.	22,800 sq mi (59,000 km^{2})	HUC1008
1009	Powder–Tongue subregion	The Powder and Tongue River Basins.	Montana and Wyoming.	18,800 sq mi (49,000 km^{2})	HUC1009
1010	Lower Yellowstone subregion	The Yellowstone River Basin below the confluence with the Big Horn River Basin, excluding the Tongue and Powder River Basins.	Montana and North Dakota.	14,000 sq mi (36,000 km^{2})	HUC1010
1011	Missouri–Little Missouri subregion	The Missouri River Basin below the confluence with the Yellowstone River Basin to Garrison Dam.	Montana, North Dakota, South Dakota, and Wyoming.	17,300 sq mi (45,000 km^{2})	HUC1011
1012	Cheyenne subregion	The Cheyenne River Basin above the normal operating pool of Lake Oahe.	Montana, Nebraska, South Dakota, and Wyoming.	24,300 sq mi (63,000 km^{2})	HUC1012
1013	Missouri–Oahe subregion	The Missouri River Basin from Garrison Dam to Oahe Dam, excluding the Cheyenne River Basin above the normal operating pool of Lake Oahe.	North Dakota and South Dakota.	37,400 sq mi (97,000 km^{2})	HUC1013
1014	Missouri–White subregion	The Missouri River Basin from Oahe Dam to Fort Randall Dam.	Nebraska and South Dakota.	20,200 sq mi (52,000 km^{2})	HUC1014
1015	Niobrara subregion	The Niobrara River Basin and the Ponca Creek Basin.	Nebraska, South Dakota, and Wyoming.	13,900 sq mi (36,000 km^{2})	HUC1015
1016	James subregion	The James River Basin.	North Dakota and South Dakota.	21,500 sq mi (56,000 km^{2})	HUC1016
1017	Missouri–Big Sioux subregion	The Missouri River Basin from Fort Randall Dam to and including the Big Sioux River Basin, but excluding the Ponca Creek, Niobrara River, and James River Basins.	Iowa, Minnesota, Nebraska, and South Dakota.	13,900 sq mi (36,000 km^{2})	HUC1017
1018	North Platte subregion	The North Platte River Basin.	Colorado, Nebraska, and Wyoming.	30,900 sq mi (80,000 km^{2})	HUC1018
1019	South Platte subregion	The South Platte River Basin.	Colorado, Nebraska, and Wyoming.	23,900 sq mi (62,000 km^{2})	HUC1019
1020	Platte subregion	The Platte River Basin below the confluence of the North and South Platte River Basins, excluding the Elkhorn and Loup River Basins.	Nebraska	8,160 sq mi (21,100 km^{2})	HUC1020
1021	Loup subregion	The Loup River Basin.	Nebraska	15,000 sq mi (39,000 km^{2})	HUC1021
1022	Elkhorn subregion	The Elkhorn River Basin.	Nebraska	6,950 sq mi (18,000 km^{2})	HUC1022
1023	Missouri–Little Sioux subregion	The Missouri River Basin below the confluence with the Big Sioux River Basin to the confluence with the Platte River Basin.	Iowa, Minnesota, and Nebraska.	9,140 sq mi (23,700 km^{2})	HUC1023
1024	Missouri–Nishnabotna subregion	The Missouri River Basin below the confluence with the Platte River Basin to the confluence with the Kansas River Basin.	Iowa, Kansas, Missouri, and Nebraska.	13,300 sq mi (34,000 km^{2})	HUC1024
1025	Republican subregion	The Republican River Basin.	Colorado, Kansas, and Nebraska.	24,700 sq mi (64,000 km^{2})	HUC1025
1026	Smoky Hill subregion	The Smoky Hill River Basin.	Colorado and Kansas.	19,800 sq mi (51,000 km^{2})	HUC1026
1027	Kansas subregion	The Kansas River Basin, excluding the Republican and Smoky Hill River Basins.	Kansas, Nebraska, and Missouri.	15,000 sq mi (39,000 km^{2})	HUC1027
1028	Chariton–Grand subregion	The Chariton, Grand, and Little Chariton River Basins.	Iowa and Missouri.	10,900 sq mi (28,000 km^{2})	HUC1028
1029	Gasconade–Osage subregion	The Gasconade and Osage River Basins.	Kansas and Missouri.	18,400 sq mi (48,000 km^{2})	HUC1029
1030	Lower Missouri subregion	The Missouri River Basin below the confluence with the Kansas River Basin to the confluence with the Mississippi River, excluding the Chariton, Gasconade, Grand, and Osage River Basins.	Kansas and Missouri.	10,200 sq mi (26,000 km^{2})	HUC1030

== See also ==
- List of rivers in the United States
- Water resource region
