= Hawaii water resource region =

US hydrologic region

The Hawaii water resource region is one of 21 major geographic areas, or regions, in the first level of classification used by the United States Geological Survey to divide and sub-divide the United States into successively smaller hydrologic units. These geographic areas contain either the drainage area of a major river, or the combined drainage areas of a series of rivers.

The Hawaii region, which is listed with a 2-digit hydrologic unit code (HUC) of 20, has an approximate size of 6,428 square miles (16,650 square kilometers), and consists of 9 subregions, which are listed with the 4-digit HUCs 2001 through 2009.

This region includes the drainage within the state of Hawaii. Includes all of Hawaii.

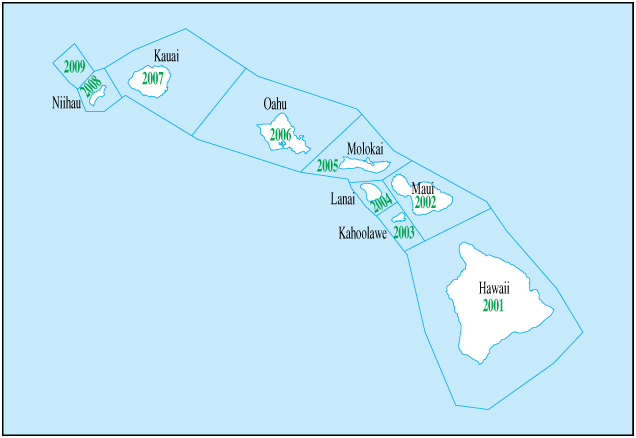
The Hawaii region, with its nine 4-digit subregion hydrologic unit boundaries.

== List of water resource subregions ==
Subregion HUC	Subregion Name	Subregion Description	Subregion Location	Subregion Size	Subregion Map
2001	Hawaii subregion	The drainage on the island of Hawaii; and associated waters.	Hawaii	4,030 sq mi (10,400 km^{2})	HUC2001
2002	Maui subregion	The drainage on the island of Maui; and associated waters.	Hawaii	730 sq mi (1,900 km^{2})	HUC2002
2003	Kahoolawe subregion	The drainage on the island of Kahoolawe; and associated waters.	Hawaii	45 sq mi (120 km^{2})	HUC2003
2004	Lanai subregion	The drainage on the island of Lanai; and associated waters.	Hawaii	140 sq mi (360 km^{2})	HUC2004
2005	Molokai subregion	The drainage on the island of Molokai; and associated waters.	Hawaii	260 sq mi (670 km^{2})	HUC2005
2006	Oahu subregion	The drainage on the island of Oahu; and associated waters.	Hawaii	630 sq mi (1,600 km^{2})	HUC2006
2007	Kauai subregion	The drainage on the island of Kauai; and associated waters.	Hawaii	560 sq mi (1,500 km^{2})	HUC2007
2008	Niihau subregion	The drainage on the islands of Niihau and Kaula; and associated waters.	Hawaii	72 sq mi (190 km^{2})	HUC2008
2009	Northwestern Hawaiian Islands subregion	The drainage on Kure, Laysan, Lisianski, Necker, and Nihoa Islands; Gardner Pinnacles; Maro, and Pearl and Hermes Reefs; French Frigate Shoals; and other islets, reefs, and associated waters northwest of Niipau Island.	Hawaii	Less than 10 sq mi (26 km^{2})	HUC2009

== See also ==
- List of rivers in the United States
- Water resource region
