= Great Lakes water resource region =

US hydrologic region

The Great Lakes water resource region is one of 21 major geographic areas, or regions, in the first level of classification used by the United States Geological Survey to divide and sub-divide the United States into successively smaller hydrologic units. These geographic areas contain either the drainage area of a major river, or the combined drainage areas of a series of rivers.

The Great Lakes region, which is listed with a 2-digit hydrologic unit code (HUC) of 04, has an approximate size of 141,984 square miles (367,740 square kilometers), and consists of 15 subregions, which are designated with the 4-digit HUCs 0401 through 0415.

This region includes the drainage within the United States that ultimately discharges into: (a) the Great Lakes system, including the lake surfaces, bays, and islands; and (b) the St. Lawrence River to the Riviere Richelieu drainage boundary. It encompasses parts of Illinois, Indiana, Michigan, Minnesota, New York, Ohio, Pennsylvania, and Wisconsin.

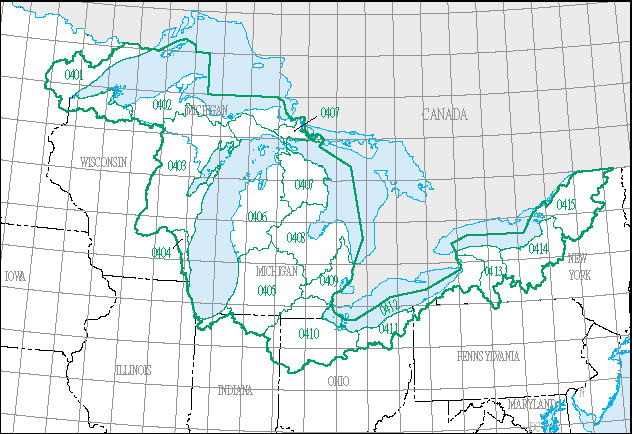
The Great Lakes region, with its 15 4-digit sub-region hydrologic unit boundaries.

== List of water resource subregions ==
Subregion HUC	Subregion Name	Subregion Description	Subregion Location	Subregion Size	Subregion Map
0401	Western Lake Superior Subregion	The drainage into Lake Superior within the United States from the Ontario-Minnesota international boundary to and including the Montreal River Basin.	Michigan, Minnesota, and Wisconsin.	9,240 sq mi (23,900 km^{2})	HUC0401
0402	Southern Lake Superior–Lake Superior Subregion	The drainage into Lake Superior within the United States from the Montreal River Basin boundary to the Soo Locks at Sault Sainte Marie, and Lake Superior within the United States, including its bays and islands.	Michigan, Minnesota, and Wisconsin.	28,600 sq mi (74,000 km^{2})	HUC0402
0403	Northwestern Lake Michigan Subregion	The drainage into Lake Michigan from the Milwaukee River Basin boundary to the Manistique River Basin boundary.	Michigan and Wisconsin	18,700 sq mi (48,000 km^{2})	HUC0403
0404	Southwestern Lake Michigan Subregion	The drainage into Lake Michigan from the St. Joseph River Basin boundary to and including the Milwaukee River Basin.	Illinois, Indiana, Michigan, and Wisconsin.	1,970 sq mi (5,100 km^{2})	HUC0404
0405	Southeastern Lake Michigan Subregion	The drainage into Lake Michigan from and including the St. Joseph River Basin to and including the Grand River Basin.	Indiana and Michigan.	12,800 sq mi (33,000 km^{2})	HUC0405
0406	Northeastern Lake Michigan–Lake Michigan Subregion	The drainage into Lake Michigan from the Grand River Basin boundary to and including the Manistique River Basin, and Lake Michigan, including its Bays and Islands.	Illinois, Indiana, Michigan, and Wisconsin.	33,600 sq mi (87,000 km^{2})	HUC0406
0407	Northwestern Lake Huron Subregion	The drainage into Lake Huron within the United States from the Soo Locks at Sault Sainte Marie to and including the Au Sable River Basin.	Michigan	7,110 sq mi (18,400 km^{2})	HUC0407
0408	Southwestern Lake Huron–Lake Huron Subregion	The drainage into Lake Huron within the United States, from the Au Sable River Basin boundary to the St. Clair River Basin boundary at the mouth of Lake Huron, and Lake Huron within the United States, including its bays and islands.	Michigan	18,000 sq mi (47,000 km^{2})	HUC0408
0409	St. Clair–Detroit Subregion	The St. Clair and Detroit River Basins within the United States from the mouth of Lake Huron to and including the Huron River Basin, and Lake St. Clair within the United States.	Michigan	3,960 sq mi (10,300 km^{2})	HUC0409
0410	Western Lake Erie Subregion	The drainage into Lake Erie from the Huron River Basin boundary to and including the Vermilion River Basin.	Indiana, Michigan, and Ohio.	11,900 sq mi (31,000 km^{2})	HUC0410
0411	Southern Lake Erie Subregion	The drainage into Lake Erie from the Vermilion River Basin boundary to and including the Ashtabula River Basin.	Ohio and Pennsylvania.	3,030 sq mi (7,800 km^{2})	HUC0411
0412	Eastern Lake Erie–Lake Erie Subregion	The drainage into Lake Erie within the United States from the Ashtabula River Basin boundary to and including the Niagara River Basin, and Lake Erie within the United States, including its bays and islands.	Michigan, New York, Ohio, and Pennsylvania.	7,740 sq mi (20,000 km^{2})	HUC0412
0413	Southwestern Lake Ontario Subregion	The drainage into Lake Ontario from the Niagara River Basin boundary to and including the Genesee River Basin.	New York and Pennsylvania.	3,540 sq mi (9,200 km^{2})	HUC0413
0414	Southeastern Lake Ontario Subregion	The drainage into Lake Ontario from the Genesee River Basin boundary to and including the Stony Creek Basin.	New York	6,710 sq mi (17,400 km^{2})	HUC0414
0415	Northeastern Lake Ontario–Lake Ontario–St. Lawrence Subregion	The drainage into Lake Ontario and the St. Lawrence River Basin within the United States from the Stony Creek Basin boundary to and including the English River Basin, and Lake Ontario within the United States, including its bays and islands.	New York	11,400 sq mi (30,000 km^{2})	HUC0415

== See also ==
- List of rivers in the United States
- Water resource region
