= Lower Colorado water resource region =

US hydrologic region

The Lower Colorado water resource region is one of 21 major geographic areas, or regions, in the first level of classification used by the United States Geological Survey to divide and sub-divide the United States into successively smaller hydrologic units. These geographic areas contain either the drainage area of a major river, or the combined drainage areas of a series of rivers.

The Lower Colorado region, which is listed with a 2-digit hydrologic unit code (HUC) of 15, has an approximate size of 140,146 square miles (362,980 square kilometers), and consists of 8 subregions, which are listed with the 4-digit HUCs 1501 through 1508.

This region includes the drainage within the United States of: (a) the Colorado River Basin below the Lee Ferry compact point which is one mile below the mouth of the Paria River; (b) streams that originate within the United States and ultimately discharge into the Gulf of California; and (c) the Animas Valley, Willcox Playa, and other smaller closed basins. Includes parts of Arizona, California, Nevada, New Mexico, and Utah.

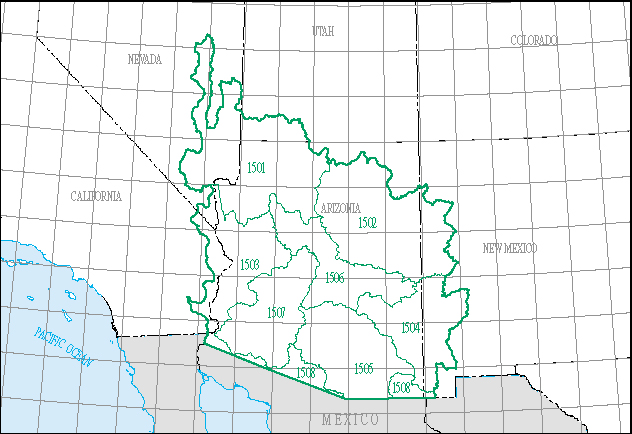
The Lower Colorado region, with its eight 4-digit subregion hydrologic unit boundaries.

== List of water resource subregions ==
Subregion HUC	Subregion Name	Subregion Description	Subregion Location	Subregion Size	Subregion Map
1501	Lower Colorado–Lake Mead subregion	The Colorado River Basin from the Lee Ferry compact point to Hoover Dam, but excluding the Little Colorado River Basin.	Arizona, Nevada, and Utah.	29,900 sq mi (77,000 km^{2})	HUC1501
1502	Little Colorado subregion	The Little Colorado River Basin.	Arizona and New Mexico.	26,900 sq mi (70,000 km^{2})	HUC1502
1503	Lower Colorado subregion	The Colorado River Basin within the United States below Hoover Dam, excluding the Gila River Basin.	Arizona, California, and Nevada.	17,000 sq mi (44,000 km^{2})	HUC1503
1504	Upper Gila subregion	The Gila River Basin above Coolidge Dam, including the Animas Valley closed basin.	Arizona and New Mexico.	15,100 sq mi (39,000 km^{2})	HUC1504
1505	Middle Gila subregion	The Gila River Basin within the United States from Coolidge Dam to the confluence with the Salt River Basin, including the Willcox closed basin.	Arizona	16,900 sq mi (44,000 km^{2})	HUC1505
1506	Salt subregion	The Salt River Basin.	Arizona	13,700 sq mi (35,000 km^{2})	HUC1506
1507	Lower Gila subregion	The Gila River Basin below the confluence with the Salt River Basin to the confluence with the Colorado River.	Arizona	14,800 sq mi (38,000 km^{2})	HUC1507
1508	Sonora subregion	The drainage that originates within the United States east of the Colorado River Basin and ultimately discharges into the Gulf of California.	Arizona and New Mexico.	4,830 sq mi (12,500 km^{2})	HUC1508

== See also ==
- List of rivers in the United States
- Water resource region
