= Great Basin water resource region =

US hydrologic region

The Great Basin water resource region is one of 21 major geographic areas, or regions, in the first level of classification used by the United States Geological Survey to divide and sub-divide the United States into successively smaller hydrologic units. These geographic areas contain either the drainage area of a major river, or the combined drainage areas of a series of rivers.

The Great Basin region, which is listed with a 2-digit HUC code of 16, has an approximate size of 141,717 square miles (367,050 square kilometers), and consists of 6 subregions, which are listed with the 4-digit HUC codes of 1601 through 1606.

This region includes the drainage of the Great Basin that discharges into the states of Utah and Nevada. This includes parts of California, Idaho, Nevada, Oregon, Utah, and Wyoming.

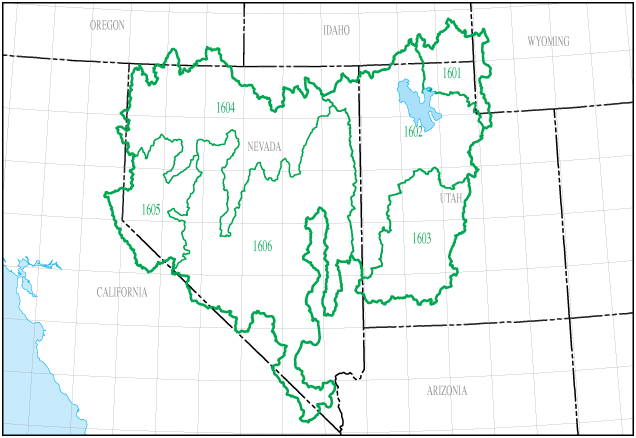
The Great Basin region, with its six 4-digit subregion hydrologic unit boundaries.

== List of water resource subregions ==
Subregion HUC	Subregion Name	Subregion Description	Subregion Location	Subregion Size	Subregion Map
1601	Bear subregion	The Bear River Basin.	Idaho, Utah, and Wyoming.	7,310 sq mi (18,900 km^{2})	HUC1601
1602	Great Salt Lake subregion	The Great Salt Lake Basin excluding the Bear River Basin.	Idaho, Nevada, Utah, and Wyoming.	28,700 sq mi (74,000 km^{2})	HUC1602
1603	Escalante Desert–Sevier Lake subregion	The Escalante Desert and the Sevier Lake closed basins.	Nevada and Utah.	16,200 sq mi (42,000 km^{2})	HUC1603
1604	Black Rock Desert–Humboldt subregion	The Humboldt River Basin, the Black Rock Desert, and other closed basins that discharge into Northwestern Nevada.	California, Nevada, and Oregon.	28,300 sq mi (73,000 km^{2})	HUC1604
1605	Central Lahontan subregion	The Central Lahontan Basin Consisting of the Carson, Truckee, and Walker River Basins.	California and Nevada.	12,500 sq mi (32,000 km^{2})	HUC1605
1606	Central Nevada Desert Basins subregion	The Closed Desert Basins that discharge into South Central Nevada.	California and Nevada.	47,100 sq mi (122,000 km^{2})	HUC1606

== See also ==
- List of rivers in the United States
- Water resource region
