= New England water resource region =

US hydrologic region

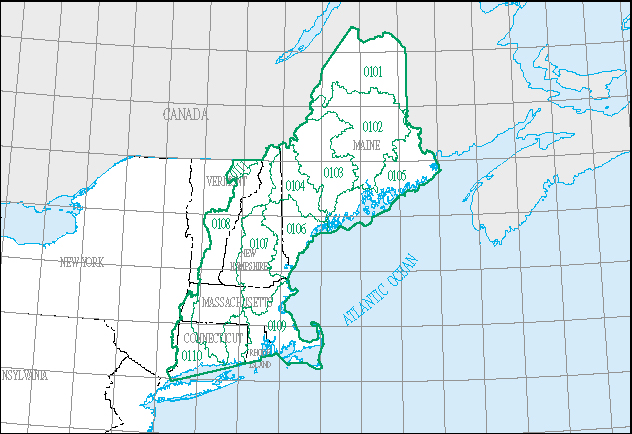
- The New England region, with its 11 4-digit sub-region hydrologic unit boundaries.

Location
- Countries: Canada, United States
- States: Includes all of Maine, New Hampshire and Rhode Island, and parts of Connecticut, Massachusetts, New York, and Vermont

Physical characteristics
- Basin size: 73,753 sq mi (191,020 km^{2})

The New England water resource region is one of 21 major geographic areas, or regions, in the first level of classification used by the United States Geological Survey to divide and sub-divide the United States into successively smaller hydrologic units. These geographic areas contain either the drainage area of a major river, or the combined drainage areas of a series of rivers. The New England region, which is listed with a 2-digit hydrologic unit code (HUC) of 01, has an approximate size of 73,753 square miles (191,020 square kilometers), and consists of 11 sub-regions, which are listed with the 4-digit HUCs 0101 through 0111.

This region includes the drainage within the United States that ultimately discharges into: (a) the Bay of Fundy; (b) the Atlantic Ocean within and between the states of Maine and Connecticut; (c) Long Island Sound north of the New York-Connecticut state line; and (d) the Riviere St. François, a tributary of the Saint Lawrence River. The region includes all of Maine, New Hampshire and Rhode Island, and parts of Connecticut, Massachusetts, New York, and Vermont.

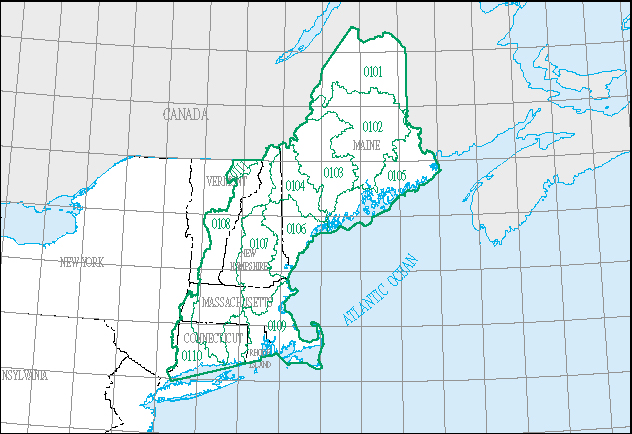
The New England region, with its 11 4-digit sub-region hydrologic unit boundaries.

== List of water resource subregions ==
Subregion HUC	Subregion Name	Subregion Description	Subregion Location	Subregion Size	Subregion Map
0101	St. John subregion	The St. John River Basin within the United States.	Located in Maine.	14,092 sq mi (36,500 km^{2})	HUC0101
0102	Penobscot subregion	The Penobscot River Basin.	Located in Maine.	8,616 sq mi (22,320 km^{2})	HUC0102
0103	Kennebec subregion	The Kennebec River Basin, including part of Merrymeeting Bay.	Located in Maine.	5,895 sq mi (15,270 km^{2})	HUC0103
0104	Androscoggin subregion	The Androscoggin River Basin, including part of Merrymeeting Bay.	Located in Maine and New Hampshire.	3,527 sq mi (9,130 km^{2})	HUC0104
0105	Maine Coastal subregion	The coastal drainage and associated waters from the Maine-New Brunswick international boundary to Cape Small, Maine, including the St. Croix River Basin within the United States.	Located in Maine.	11,558 sq mi (29,940 km^{2})	HUC0105
0106	Saco subregion	The coastal drainage and associated waters from Cape Small, Maine to the Merrimack River Basin boundary.	Located in Maine, New Hampshire, and Massachusetts.	4,809 sq mi (12,460 km^{2})	HUC0106
0107	Merrimack subregion	The Merrimack River Basin.	Located in Massachusetts and New Hampshire.	5,007 sq mi (12,970 km^{2})	HUC0107
0108	Connecticut subregion	The Connecticut River Basin.	Located in Connecticut, Massachusetts, New Hampshire, and Vermont.	11,265 sq mi (29,180 km^{2})	HUC0108
0109	Massachusetts-Rhode Island Coastal subregion	The coastal drainage and associated waters from the Merrimack River Basin boundary to and including the Pawcatuck River Basin.	Located in Connecticut, Massachusetts, and Rhode Island.	4,439 sq mi (11,500 km^{2})	HUC0109
0110	Connecticut Coastal subregion	The coastal drainage into Long Island Sound from the Pawcatuck River Basin boundary to and including the Byram River Basin, excluding the Connecticut River Basin, and including Long Island Sound north of the New York-Connecticut state line.	Located in Connecticut, Massachusetts, New York, and Rhode Island.	4,545 sq mi (11,770 km^{2})	HUC0110
0111	St. Francois subregion	The Riviere St. Francois Basin within the United States.	Located in Vermont.	590 sq mi (1,500 km^{2})	HUC0111

== See also ==
- List of rivers of the United States
- Water resource region
