= Mid Atlantic water resource region =

US hydrologic region

The Mid Atlantic water resource region is one of 21 major geographic areas, or regions, in the first level of classification used by the United States Geological Survey to divide and sub-divide the United States into successively smaller hydrologic units. These geographic areas contain either the drainage area of a major river, or the combined drainage areas of a series of rivers.

The Mid Atlantic region, which is listed with a 2-digit hydrologic unit code (HUC) of 02, has an approximate size of 106,334 square miles (275,400 square kilometers), and consists of 8 subregions, which are listed with the 4-digit HUCs 0201 through 0208.

This region includes the drainage within the United States that ultimately discharges into: (a) the Atlantic Ocean within and between the states of New York and Virginia; (b) Long Island Sound south of the New York-Connecticut State Line; and (c) the Riviere Richelieu, a tributary of the St. Lawrence River. It includes all of Delaware and New Jersey and the District of Columbia, and parts of Connecticut, Maryland, Massachusetts, New York, Pennsylvania, Vermont, Virginia, and West Virginia.

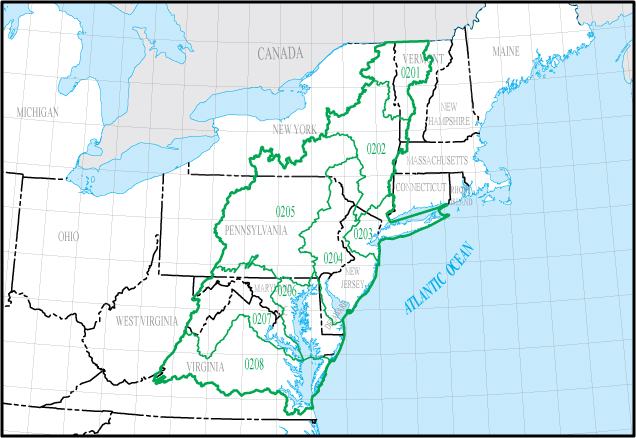
The Mid Atlantic region, with its 8 4-digit subregion hydrologic unit boundaries.

== Listing of water resource subregions ==
Subregion HUC	Subregion Name	Subregion Description	Subregion Location	Subregion Size	Subregion Map
0201	Richelieu subregion	The Riviere Richelieu Basin, including Lake Champlain drainage, within the United States.	Located in New York and Vermont.	7,720 sq mi (20,000 km^{2})	HUC0201
0202	Upper Hudson subregion	The Hudson River Basin to and including the Popolopen Brook Basin just upstream from Bear Mountain Bridge.	Located in New Jersey, New York, Massachusetts, and Vermont.	12,666 sq mi (32,800 km^{2})	HUC0202
0203	Lower Hudson–Long Island subregion	The coastal drainage and associated waters from the Byram River Basin boundary, to the Manasquan River Basin boundary, including the Hudson River Basin downstream from the Popolopen Brook Basin boundary, Long Island and Block Island Sounds south of the New York-Connecticut state line, and Long Island.	Located in Connecticut, New Jersey, and New York.	7,259 sq mi (18,800 km^{2})	HUC0203
0204	Delaware–Mid Atlantic Coastal subregion	The coastal drainage and associated waters from and including the Manasquan River Basin to and including the Delaware River Basin which includes Delaware Bay.	Located in Delaware, Maryland, New Jersey, New York, and Pennsylvania.	17,977 sq mi (46,560 km^{2})	HUC0204
0205	Susquehanna subregion	The Susquehanna River Basin.	Located in Maryland, New York, and Pennsylvania.	27,500 sq mi (71,000 km^{2})	HUC0205
0206	Upper Chesapeake subregion	The Chesapeake Bay and its tributary drainage north of the Maryland-Virginia state line including the Pocomoke River drainage, excluding the Susquehanna and Potomac River Basins; and the Coastal drainage from the Delaware Bay drainage boundary to Chincoteague Inlet on the Delmarva Peninsula.	Located in Delaware, Maryland, Virginia, and Pennsylvania.	5,871 sq mi (15,210 km^{2})	HUC0206
0207	Potomac subregion	The Potomac River Basin.	Located in District of Columbia, Maryland, Pennsylvania, Virginia, and West Virginia.	14,679 sq mi (38,020 km^{2})	HUC0207
0208	Lower Chesapeake subregion	The Chesapeake Bay and its tributary drainage south of the Maryland-Virginia state line excluding the Pocomoke River drainage; and the Coastal drainage from Chincoteague Inlet on the Delmarva Peninsula to the Back Bay drainage boundary.	Located in Virginia.	20,682 sq mi (53,570 km^{2})	HUC0208

== See also ==
- List of rivers in the United States
- Water resource region
