= Rio Grande water resource region =

US hydrologic region

The Rio Grande water resource region is one of 21 major geographic areas, or regions, in the first level of classification used by the United States Geological Survey to divide and sub-divide the United States into successively smaller hydrologic units. These geographic areas contain either the drainage area of a major river, or the combined drainage areas of a series of rivers.

The Rio Grande region, which is listed with a 2-digit hydrologic unit code (HUC) of 13, has an approximate size of 132,517 square miles (343,220 square kilometers), and consists of 9 subregions, which are listed with the 4-digit HUCs 1301 through 1309.

This region includes the drainage within the United States of: (a) the Rio Grande Basin, and (b) the San Luis Valley, North Plains, Plains of San Agustin, Mimbres River, Estancia, Jornada Del Muerto, Tularosa Valley, Salt Basin, and other closed basins. Includes parts of Colorado, New Mexico, and Texas.

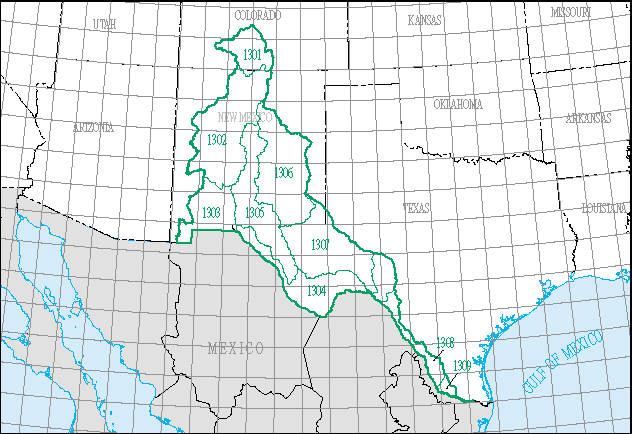
The Rio Grande region, with its 9 4-digit subregion hydrologic unit boundaries.

== List of water resource subregions ==
Subregion HUC	Subregion Name	Subregion Description	Subregion Location	Subregion Size	Subregion Map
1301	Rio Grande headwaters Subregion	The Rio Grande Basin from its headwaters to the river's intersect with the Colorado-New Mexico state line, including the San Luis Valley closed basin.	Colorado and New Mexico.	7,580 sq mi (19,600 km^{2})	HUC1301
1302	Rio Grande–Elephant Butte subregion	The Rio Grande Basin from the Colorado-New Mexico state line to and including Elephant Butte Reservoir, and including the North Plains, Jornada Del Muerto, and Plains of San Agustin closed basins.	Colorado and New Mexico.	26,900 sq mi (70,000 km^{2})	HUC1302
1303	Rio Grande–Mimbres subregion	The drainage within the United states of the Rio Grande Basin from Elephant Butte Reservoir to the junction of the Mexico, New Mexico, and Texas international boundary, and including the Jornada Draw, Mimbres River, and Other closed basins west of the Rio Grande.	New Mexico and Texas.	11,100 sq mi (29,000 km^{2})	HUC1303
1304	Rio Grande–Amistad subregion	The drainage within the United states of the Rio Grande Basin from the Junction of the Mexico, New Mexico, and Texas international boundary to and including Amistad Reservoir, but excluding the Pecos River Basin.	Texas	18,700 sq mi (48,000 km^{2})	HUC1304
1305	Rio Grande closed basins subregion	The Estancia, Tularosa Valley, Salt Basin and other closed basins lying between the Rio Grande and the Pecos River Basins.	New Mexico and Texas.	17,500 sq mi (45,000 km^{2})	HUC1305
1306	Upper Pecos subregion	The Pecos River Basin to but excluding the Delaware River Basin.	New Mexico and Texas.	23,500 sq mi (61,000 km^{2})	HUC1306
1307	Lower Pecos subregion	The Pecos River Basin from and including the Delaware River Basin to the confluence with the Rio Grande.	New Mexico and Texas.	20,800 sq mi (54,000 km^{2})	HUC1307
1308	Rio Grande–Falcon subregion	The drainage within the United states of the Rio Grande Basin from Amistad Reservoir to and including Falcon Reservoir.	Texas	5,170 sq mi (13,400 km^{2})	HUC1308
1309	Lower Rio Grande subregion	The drainage within the United states of the Rio Grande Basin from Falcon Reservoir to the Gulf of Mexico.	Texas.	1,260 sq mi (3,300 km^{2})	HUC1309

== See also ==
- List of rivers in the United States
- Water resource region
