= Souris–Red–Rainy water resource region =

US hydrologic region

The Souris–Red–Rainy region is one of 21 major geographic areas, or regions, in the first level of classification used by the United States Geological Survey to divide and sub-divide the United States into successively smaller hydrologic units. These geographic areas contain either the drainage area of a major river, or the combined drainage areas of a series of rivers.

The Souris–Red–Rainy Region, which is listed with a 2-digit hydrologic unit code (HUC) of 09, has an approximate size of 90,759 square miles (235,060 square kilometers), and consists of 3 subregions, which are listed with the 4-digit HUC codes of 0901 through 0903.

This region includes the drainage within the United States of the Lake of the Woods and the Rainy, Red, and Souris River Basins that ultimately discharges into Lake Winnipeg and Hudson Bay. Includes parts of Minnesota, North Dakota, and South Dakota.

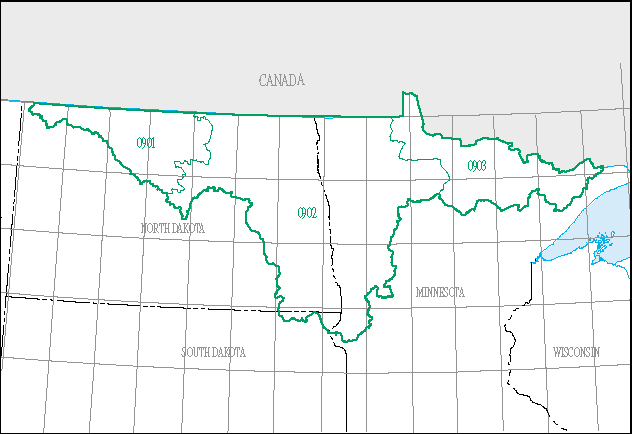
The Souris–Red–Rainy Region, with its 3 4-digit subregion hydrologic unit boundaries.

== List of water resource subregions ==
Subregion HUC	Subregion Name	Subregion Description	Subregion Location	Subregion Size	Subregion Map
0901	Souris subregion	The Souris River Basin within the United States.	North Dakota	9,150 sq mi (23,700 km^{2})	HUC0901
0902	Red subregion	The Red River Basin within the United States including the Devils Lake closed basin.	Minnesota, North Dakota, and South Dakota.	39,800 sq mi (103,000 km^{2})	HUC0902
0903	Rainy subregion	The Rainy River Basin and Lake of the Woods drainage within the United States.	Minnesota	11,400 sq mi (30,000 km^{2})	HUC0903

== See also ==
- List of rivers in the United States
- Water resource region
