= Upper Colorado water resource region =

US hydrologic region

The Upper Colorado water resource region is one of 21 major geographic areas, or regions, in the first level of classification used by the United States Geological Survey to divide and sub-divide the United States into successively smaller hydrologic units. These geographic areas contain either the drainage area of a major river, or the combined drainage areas of a series of rivers.

The Upper Colorado region, which is listed with a 2-digit hydrologic unit code (HUC) of 14, has an approximate size of 113,347 square miles (293,570 square kilometers), and consists of 8 subregions, which are listed with the 4-digit HUCs 1401 through 1408.

This region includes the drainage of: (a) the Colorado River Basin above the Lee Ferry compact point which is one mile below the mouth of the Paria River; and (b) the Great Divide closed basin. Includes parts of Arizona, Colorado, New Mexico, Utah, and Wyoming.

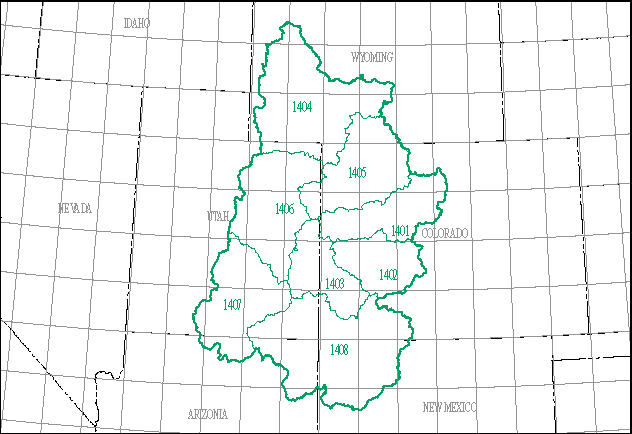
The Upper Colorado region, with its 8 4-digit subregion hydrologic unit boundaries.

== List of water resource subregions ==
Subregion HUC	Subregion Name	Subregion Description	Subregion Location	Subregion Size	Subregion Map
1401	Colorado headwaters subregion	The Colorado River Basin to but excluding the Bitter Creek Basin, and excluding the Gunnison River Basin.	Colorado and Utah.	9,730 sq mi (25,200 km^{2})	HUC1401
1402	Gunnison subregion	The Gunnison River Basin.	Colorado	7,930 sq mi (20,500 km^{2})	HUC1402
1403	Upper Colorado–Dolores subregion	The Colorado River Basin from and including the Bitter Creek Basin to the confluence with the Green River Basin.	Colorado and Utah.	8,250 sq mi (21,400 km^{2})	HUC1403
1404	Great Divide – Upper Green subregion	The Green River Basin above the confluence with the Yampa River Basin; and the Great Divide closed basin.	Utah and Wyoming.	20,600 sq mi (53,000 km^{2})	HUC1404
1405	White–Yampa subregion	The White and Yampa River Basins.	Colorado, Utah, and Wyoming.	13,100 sq mi (34,000 km^{2})	HUC1405
1406	Lower Green subregion	The Green River Basin below the confluence with the Yampa River Basin, but excluding the Yampa and White River Basins.	Colorado and Utah.	14,400 sq mi (37,000 km^{2})	HUC1406
1407	Upper Colorado–Dirty Devil subregion	The Colorado River Basin below the confluence with the Green River Basin to the Lee Ferry compact point, but excluding the San Juan River Basin.	Arizona and Utah.	13,500 sq mi (35,000 km^{2})	HUC1407
1408	San Juan subregion	The San Juan River Basin.	Arizona, Colorado, New Mexico, and Utah.	24,600 sq mi (64,000 km^{2})	HUC1408

== See also ==
- List of rivers in the United States
