= Pacific Northwest water resource region =

US hydrologic region

The Pacific Northwest water resource region is one of 21 major geographic areas, or regions, in the first level of classification used by the United States Geological Survey to divide and sub-divide the United States into successively smaller hydrologic units. These geographic areas contain either the drainage area of a major river, or the combined drainage areas of a series of rivers.

The Pacific Northwest region, which is listed with a 2-digit hydrologic unit code (HUC) of 17, has an approximate size of 302,334 square miles (783,040 square kilometers), and consists of 12 subregions, which are listed with the 4-digit HUCs 1701 through 1706.

This region includes the drainage within the United States that ultimately discharges into: (a) the Strait of Georgia and of Strait of Juan de Fuca, and (b) the Pacific Ocean within the states of Oregon and Washington; and that part of the Great Basin whose discharge is into the state of Oregon. Includes all of Washington and parts of California, Idaho, Montana, Nevada, Oregon, Utah, and Wyoming.

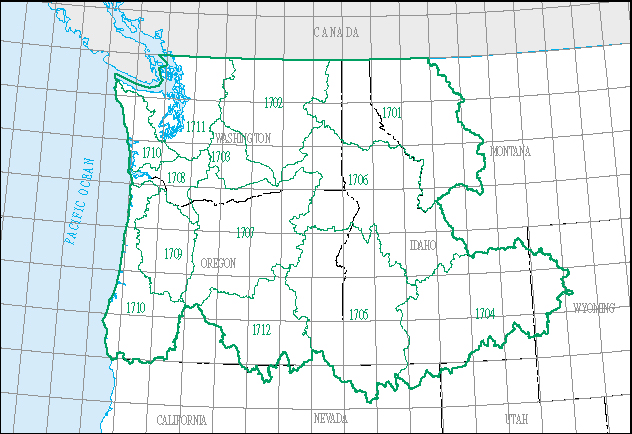
The Pacific Northwest region, with its 12 4-digit subregion hydrologic unit boundaries.

== List of water resource subregions ==
Subregion HUC	Subregion Name	Subregion Description	Subregion Location	Subregion Size	Subregion Map
1701	Kootenai–Pend Oreille–Spokane subregion	The Kootenai, Pend Oreille, and Spokane River Basins within the United States.	Idaho, Montana, and Washington.	36,600 sq mi (95,000 km^{2})	HUC1701
1702	Upper Columbia subregion	The Columbia River Basin within the United States above the confluence with the Snake River Basin, excluding the Yakima River Basin.	Washington	22,600 sq mi (59,000 km^{2})	HUC1702
1703	Yakima subregion	The Yakima River Basin.	Washington	6,210 sq mi (16,100 km^{2})	HUC1703
1704	Upper Snake subregion	The Snake River Basin to and including the Clover Creek Basin.	Idaho, Nevada, Utah, and Wyoming.	35,600 sq mi (92,000 km^{2})	HUC1704
1705	Middle Snake subregion	The Snake River Basin below the Clover Creek Basin to Hells Canyon Dam.	Idaho, Nevada, and Oregon.	36,700 sq mi (95,000 km^{2})	HUC1705
1706	Lower Snake subregion	The Snake River Basin below Hells Canyon Dam to its confluence with the Columbia River.	Idaho, Oregon, and Washington.	35,200 sq mi (91,000 km^{2})	HUC1706
1707	Middle Columbia subregion	The Columbia River Basin below the confluence with the Snake River Basin to Bonneville Dam.	Oregon and Washington.	29,800 sq mi (77,000 km^{2})	HUC1707
1708	Lower Columbia subregion	The Columbia River Basin below Bonneville Dam, excluding the Willamette River Basin.	Oregon and Washington.	6,250 sq mi (16,200 km^{2})	HUC1708
1709	Willamette subregion	The Willamette River Basin.	Oregon	11,400 sq mi (30,000 km^{2})	HUC1709
1710	Oregon–Washington Coastal subregion	The drainage into the drainage boundary to the Smith River Basin boundary, excluding the Columbia River Basin.	California, Oregon, and Washington.	23,200 sq mi (60,000 km^{2})	HUC1710
1711	Puget Sound subregion	The drainage within the United States that discharges into: (a) Puget Sound and the Straits of Georgia and of Juan De Fuca; and (b) the Fraser River Basin.	Washington	16,800 sq mi (44,000 km^{2})	HUC1711
1712	Oregon closed basins subregion	The drainage of the Great Basin that discharges into the state of Oregon.	California, Nevada, and Oregon.	17,300 sq mi (45,000 km^{2})	HUC1712

== See also ==
- List of rivers in the United States
- Water resource region
