= Upper Mississippi water resource region =

US hydrologic region

The Upper Mississippi water resource region is one of 21 major geographic areas, or regions, in the first level of classification used by the United States Geological Survey to divide and sub-divide the United States into successively smaller hydrologic units. These geographic areas contain either the drainage area of a major river, or the combined drainage areas of a series of rivers.

The Upper Mississippi region, which is listed with a 2-digit hydrologic unit code (HUC) of 07, has an approximate size of 189,968 square miles (492,010 square kilometers), and consists of 14 subregions, which are listed with the 4-digit HUCs 0701 through 0711. In a 1975 report, the region was described as "rich in water - surface water is plentiful, and ground water is a large, important, and manageable resource."

This region includes the drainage of the Mississippi River Basin above the confluence with the Ohio River, excluding the Missouri River Basin. Includes parts of Illinois, Indiana, Iowa, Michigan, Minnesota, Missouri, South Dakota, and Wisconsin.

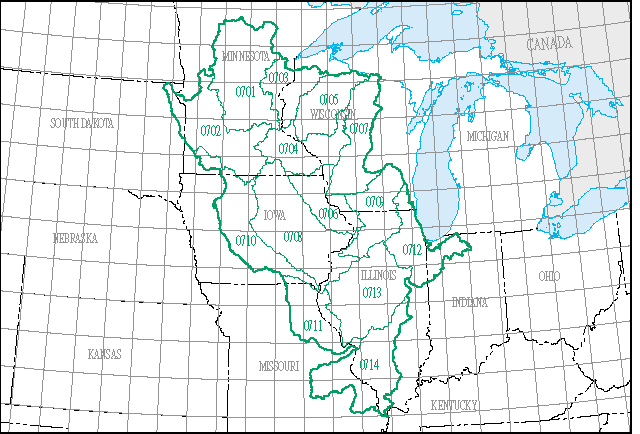
The Upper Mississippi region, with its 14 4-digit subregion hydrologic unit boundaries.

== List of water resource subregions ==
Subregion HUC	Subregion Name	Subregion Description	Subregion Location	Subregion Size (mi^{2})	Subregion Map
0701	Mississippi Headwaters Subregion	The Mississippi River Basin above the confluence with the St. Croix River Basin, excluding the Minnesota River Basin.	Located in Minnesota.	20,200 sq mi (52,000 km^{2})	HUC0701
0702	Minnesota Subregion	The Minnesota River Basin.	Located in Iowa, Minnesota, and South Dakota.	16,800 sq mi (44,000 km^{2})	HUC0702
0703	St. Croix Subregion	The St. Croix River Basin.	Located in Minnesota and Wisconsin.	7,750 sq mi (20,100 km^{2})	HUC0703
0704	Upper Mississippi–Black–Root Subregion	The Mississippi River Basin below the confluence with the St. Croix River Basin to and including the Root River Basin west of the Mississippi River and the La Crosse River Basin east of the Mississippi River, excluding the Chippewa River Basin.	Located in Iowa, Minnesota, and Wisconsin.	10,700 sq mi (28,000 km^{2})	HUC0704
0705	Chippewa Subregion	The Chippewa River Basin.	Located in Michigan and Wisconsin.	9,570 sq mi (24,800 km^{2})	HUC0705
0706	Upper Mississippi–Maquoketa–Plum Subregion	The Mississippi River Basin below the Root River Basin west of the Mississippi River and the La Crosse River Basin east of the Mississippi River to Lock and Dam 13, excluding the Wisconsin River Basin.	Located in Illinois, Iowa, Minnesota, and Wisconsin.	8,610 sq mi (22,300 km^{2})	HUC0706
0707	Wisconsin Subregion	The Wisconsin River Basin.	Located in Michigan and Wisconsin.	11,900 sq mi (31,000 km^{2})	HUC0707
0708	Upper Mississippi–Iowa–Skunk–Wapsipinicon Subregion	Mississippi River Basin below Lock and Dam 13 to the confluence with the Des Moines River Basin, excluding the Rock River Basin.	Located in Illinois, Iowa, and Michigan.	22,800 sq mi (59,000 km^{2})	HUC0708
0709	Rock Subregion	The Rock River Basin.	Located in Illinois and Wisconsin.	10,900 sq mi (28,000 km^{2})	HUC0709
0710	Des Moines Subregion	The Des Moines River Basin.	Located in Iowa, Minnesota, and Missouri.	14,400 sq mi (37,000 km^{2})	HUC0710
0711	Upper Mississippi–Salt Subregion	The Mississippi River Basin below the confluence with the Des Moines River Basin to the confluence with the Missouri River Basin, excluding the Illinois River Basin.	Located in Illinois, Iowa, and Missouri.	9,970 sq mi (25,800 km^{2})	HUC0711
0712	Upper Illinois Subregion	The Illinois River Basin above the confluence of and including the Fox River Basin.	Located in Illinois, Indiana, Michigan, and Wisconsin.	10,900 sq mi (28,000 km^{2})	HUC0712
0713	Lower Illinois Subregion	The Illinois River Basin below the confluence of the Fox River Basin.	Located in Illinois.	17,700 sq mi (46,000 km^{2})	HUC0713
0714	Upper Mississippi–Kaskaskia–Meramec Subregion	The Mississippi River Basin below the confluence with and excluding the Missouri River Basin to the confluence with the Ohio River.	Located in Illinois and Missouri.	11,200 sq mi (29,000 km^{2})	HUC0714

== See also ==
- List of rivers in the United States
- Water resource region
