= Arthur Newell Strahler =

American geologist (1918–2002)

Diagram showing the Strahler Stream Order

Arthur Newell Strahler (February 20, 1918 – December 6, 2002) was a geoscience professor at Columbia University who in 1952 developed the Strahler Stream Order system for classifying streams according to the power of their tributaries.

Strahler was largely responsible for the shift from qualitative to quantitative geomorphology during the mid 20th century.

== Significant works ==
- Strahler, A. N. (1952). "Dynamic basis of geomorphology". Geological Society of America Bulletin 63: 923–938.
- Strahler, A. N. (1952). "Hypsometric (Area-Altitude) analysis of erosional topography". Geological Society of America Bulletin 63: 1117–1142.
- Strahler, A. N. (1957). "Quantitative analysis of watershed geomorphology". Eos, Transactions American Geophysical Union, 38(6), 913–920.
- Strahler, A. N. (1980). "Systems theory in physical geography". Physical Geography 1: 1–27.
- Strahler, A. N. (1992). "Quantitative/dynamic geomorphology at Columbia 1945-60: a retrospective". Progress in Physical Geography 16: 65–84.

== Books ==
- Strahler, A. N. (1951). Physical geography. New York: Harper & Row.
- Strahler, A. N. (1960). Objective and Quantitative Field methods of terrain analysis. New York: Harper & Row.
- Strahler, A. N. (1963). Earth sciences. New York: Harper & Row.
- Strahler, A. N. (1965). Introduction to physical geography. New York: Harper & Row.
- Strahler, A. N. (1966). A geologist's view of Cape Cod. Natural History Press.
- Strahler, A. N. (1971). Earth sciences. New York: Harper & Row.
- Strahler, A. N. (1972). Planet Earth: its physical systems through geologic time. New York: Harper & Row.
- Strahler, A. N. (1973). Introduction of physical geography. New York: John Wiley.
- Strahler, A. N. (1974). Introduction to environmental science. New York: John Wiley.
- Strahler, A. N. (1976). Elements of physical geography. New York: John Wiley.
- Strahler, A. N. (1978). Modern physical geography. New York: John Wiley.
- Strahler, A. N. (1987). Science and Earth History: The Evolution/Creation Controversy. New York: John Wiley.
- Strahler, A. N. (1990). Plate tectonics. New York: John Wiley.
