= Hydrological code =

Sequence of numbers or letters that identify a hydrological feature

A hydrological code or hydrologic unit code is a sequence of numbers or letters (a geocode) that identify a hydrological unit or feature, such as a river, river reach, lake, or area like a drainage basin (also called watershed in North America) or catchment.

One system, developed by Arthur Newell Strahler, known as the Strahler stream order, ranks streams based on a hierarchy of tributaries. Each segment of a stream or river within a river network is treated as a node in a tree, with the next segment downstream as its parent. When two first-order streams come together, they form a second-order stream. When two second-order streams come together, they form a third-order stream, and so on.

Another example is the system of assigning IDs to watersheds devised by Otto Pfafstetter, known as the Pfafstetter Coding System or the Pfafstetter System. Drainage areas are delineated in a hierarchical fashion, with "level 1" watersheds at continental scales, subdivided into smaller level 2 watersheds, which are divided into level 3 watersheds, and so on. Each watershed is assigned a unique number, called a Pfafsetter Code, based on its location within the overall drainage system.

== Europe ==
A comprehensive coding system is in use in Europe. This system codes from the ocean to the so-called primary catchment. The system determines a set of oceans or endorheic systems identified by a letter. These systems are subdivided into a maximum of 9 seas. The seas are numbered 1 to 9. Seas lying far from the ocean, for example the Black Sea receive a higher number. The seas are delimited using the so-called definitions made by the International Hydrographic Organization in 1953. The coasts of these seas are defined clockwise from north west to south east from the strait where the sea connects to the ocean or the other seas.

Component	Name	Code
Hydrological System	North Sea	A5
Landmass	Continent	00
Watershed	Rhine	8
River	Ruhr	14
Primary Catchment	Fröndenberg	593

Subsequently every watershed along this coast is assigned a number using the Pfafstetter Coding System. This implies that the four largest watersheds are selected and receive numbers 2,4,6, or 8. The watersheds in between the large systems receive numbers 3, 5, and 7. Numbers 1 and 9 are used for the small watersheds on the edges of the strait. The smaller systems can subsequently be numbered recursively or kept together for grouping purpose. Landmasses (Continent and Islands) are also numbered in a logical manner, along a clock-wise oriented sea. For Europe containing many inner seas this feature helps to read the relative location of a hydrological object in the sea.

== See also ==
- Hydrologic Unit Modeling for the United States
- Water Resource Region
