= List of aquifers =

The following is a partial list of aquifers around the world. A category-based list of aquifers is also available.

== Africa ==
- Bas Saharan Basin
- Lotikipi Basin Aquifer (Kenya)
- Murzuk-Djado Basin
- Nubian Sandstone Aquifer System

== Asia ==
- Indus Basin
- Ganges-Brahmaputra Basin
- West Siberian Basin
- Tunguss Basin
- Angara-Lena Basin
- Yakut Basin
- North China Aquifer System
- Song-Liao Basin
- Tarim Basin
- Pechora Basin
- Pretashkent Aquifer
- Sambai oothu Aquifer (Karaikudi, India)
- Indo-Gangetic Aquifer System

=== Middle-East ===
- Arabian Aquifer System
- Caspian Sea aquifer
- Taurus-Zagros Aquifer System
- Yarkon-Taninim Aquifer, also known as Mountain Aquifer (Israel-Palestine)

== Europe ==
- Adige Valley aquifer (Italy)
- Alnarpsströmmen (Sweden)
- Balanegra Aquifer (Spain)
- Chalk Aquifer (England)
- Hanko Aquifer (Finland)
- Paris Basin (France)
- North Caucasus Basin (Russia)
- Po Plain aquifer (Italy)
- Russian Platform Basins (Russia)
- Schwyll Aquifer (Wales)
- Upper Rhine aquifer (France / Germany)

== North America ==
=== Canada ===
- Arkell Spring Grounds
- Laurentian River System
- Northern Great Plains Aquifer
- Oak Ridges Moraine – north of Toronto Ontario

=== United States ===
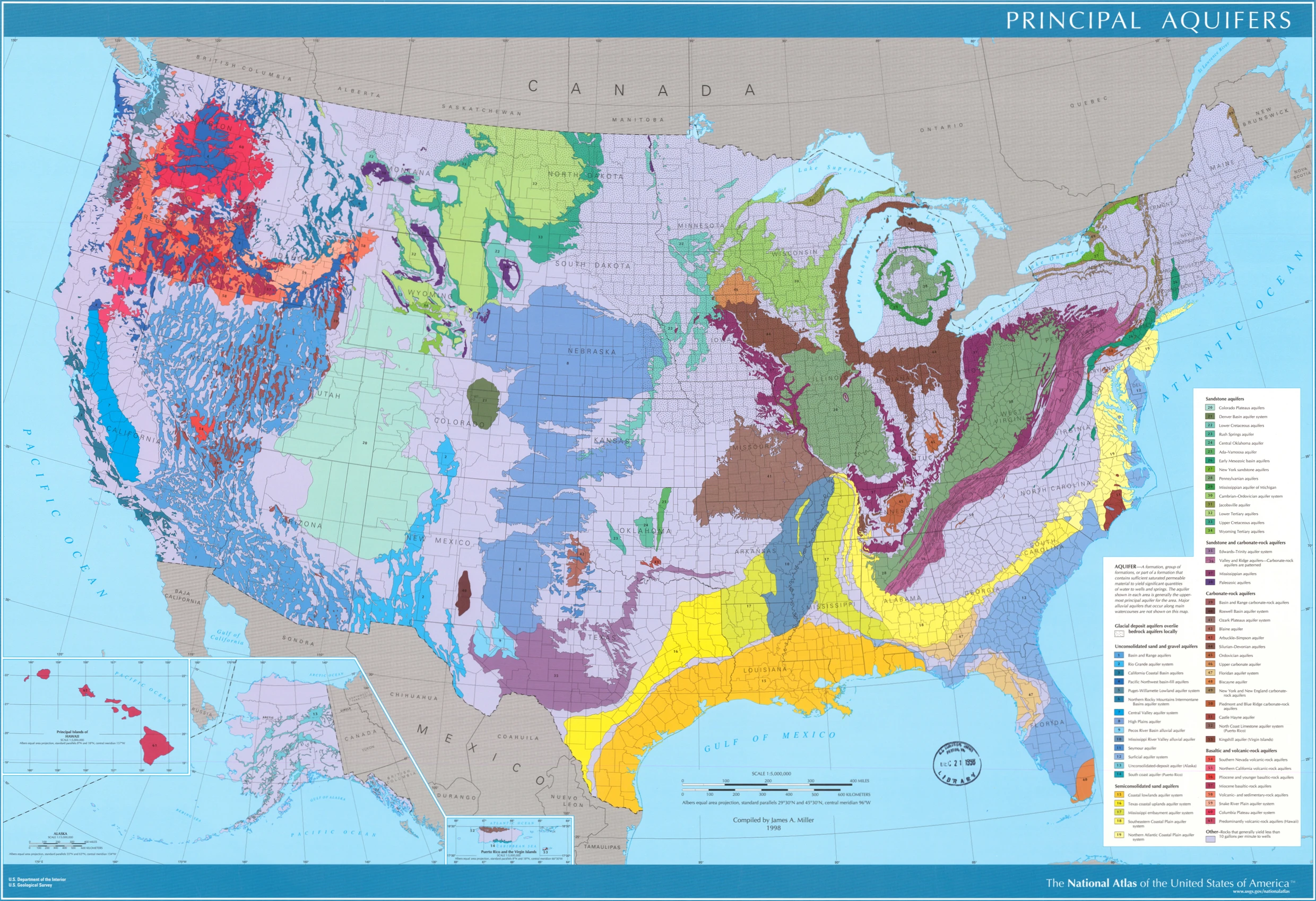
Aquifers of the United States

- Atlantic and Gulf Coastal Plains aquifer
- Biscayne Aquifer
- Bruceian aquifer
- Cambro-Ordovician aquifer system
- California Central Valley aquifer system
- Denver Basin aquifer
- Eastern Snake River Plain Aquifer
- Edwards Aquifer
- Englishtown aquifer
- Floridan aquifer
- Great Miami aquifer
- Jordan aquifer
- Kirkwood–Cohansey aquifer
- Lloyd aquifer
- Magothy aquifer – largest of Long Island's aquifers
- Mahomet Aquifer
- Medina aquifer
- Mt. Laurel–Wenonah aquifer
- Ogallala Aquifer, also known as the High Plains Aquifer
- Ozark Plateau aquifer
- Patapsco aquifer
- Permian Sea
- Potomac–Raritan–Magothy aquifer
- Saginaw Aquifer
- San Diego Formation
- San Joaquin River aquifer
- Sankoty Aquifer
- Silurian–Devonian aquifers
- Spokane Valley–Rathdrum Prairie Aquifer

=== Mexico ===
- Texcoco aquifer, one of the most overexploited in the country

== Oceania ==
=== Australia ===
- Botany Sands Aquifer
- Canning Basin
- Gnangara Mound
- Great Artesian Basin
- Jandakot Mound
- Leederville Aquifer
- Yarragadee Aquifer

=== New Zealand ===
- Canterbury Plains Aquifer (Christchurch)
- Waiwhetu Aquifer (Wellington)

== South America ==
- Amazon Basin
- Maranhao Basin
- Guarani Aquifer System
- Hamza River
- Monturaqui-Negrillar-Tilopozo Aquifer
- Pampa Lagunillas Aquifer
- Pampa del Tamarugal Aquifer
- Pica Aquifer
- Purapurani Aquifer
- Silala Aquifer
- Valle de Pan de Azúcar Aquifer
