= Dalkeith Hot Pool =

Open air hot spring in Dalkeith, Western Australia

Coordinates: 32°00′07″S 115°48′22″E

Dalkeith Hot Pool was situated on the foreshore of the Swan River near Sunset Heritage Precinct.

Dalkeith Hot Pool was an open air hot spring in Dalkeith, Western Australia. It was situated on the foreshore of the Swan River near Sunset Heritage Precinct at the foot of the escarpment.

The hot spring was created in 1922 with the bursting of the casing of a pipe that was part of a nearby 500-metre-deep (1,600 ft) artesian well reaching into the Yarragadee Aquifer. This well had been drilled in 1908 on the Dalkeith foreshore to provide water, as mains water was not available at the time. After the pipe burst, locals built the Dalkeith Hot Pool by enclosing the escaping hot water with limestone walls.

During the Second World War the Dalkeith Hot Pool was moved into a concrete pool that had been built for the US Navy based in Nedlands. This concrete pool was situated further east along the foreshore, adjacent to the site on which Tawarri Reception Centre was later built in 1957 between Sunset Foreshore and Beaton Park. During this time, Dalkeith Hot Pool was used exclusively by the US Navy for rest and recuperation (R&R).

Dalkeith Hot Pool was infamous for nude – and "nearly nude" – bathing as early as 1935, and those caught by police were taken to court and fined. The pool was eventually closed in 1953, and then filled in around the time of the construction of the Dome (which would become the Tawarri Reception Centre) adjacent to Dalkeith Hot Pool. In 1962 the artesian well was plugged, and the concrete pool was apparently "removed by the City of Nedlands in the early 1990s to facilitate landscaping in the vicinity."
