= Jandakot =

Jandakot is a locality in south-west Western Australia in the southern part of the Perth metropolitan area. It may refer to:

- Jandakot, Western Australia
- Jandakot Airport
- Jandakot Mound
- Electoral district of Jandakot
