= 2010 Western Australian storms =

Storms travelling across southwestern Australia in March 2010

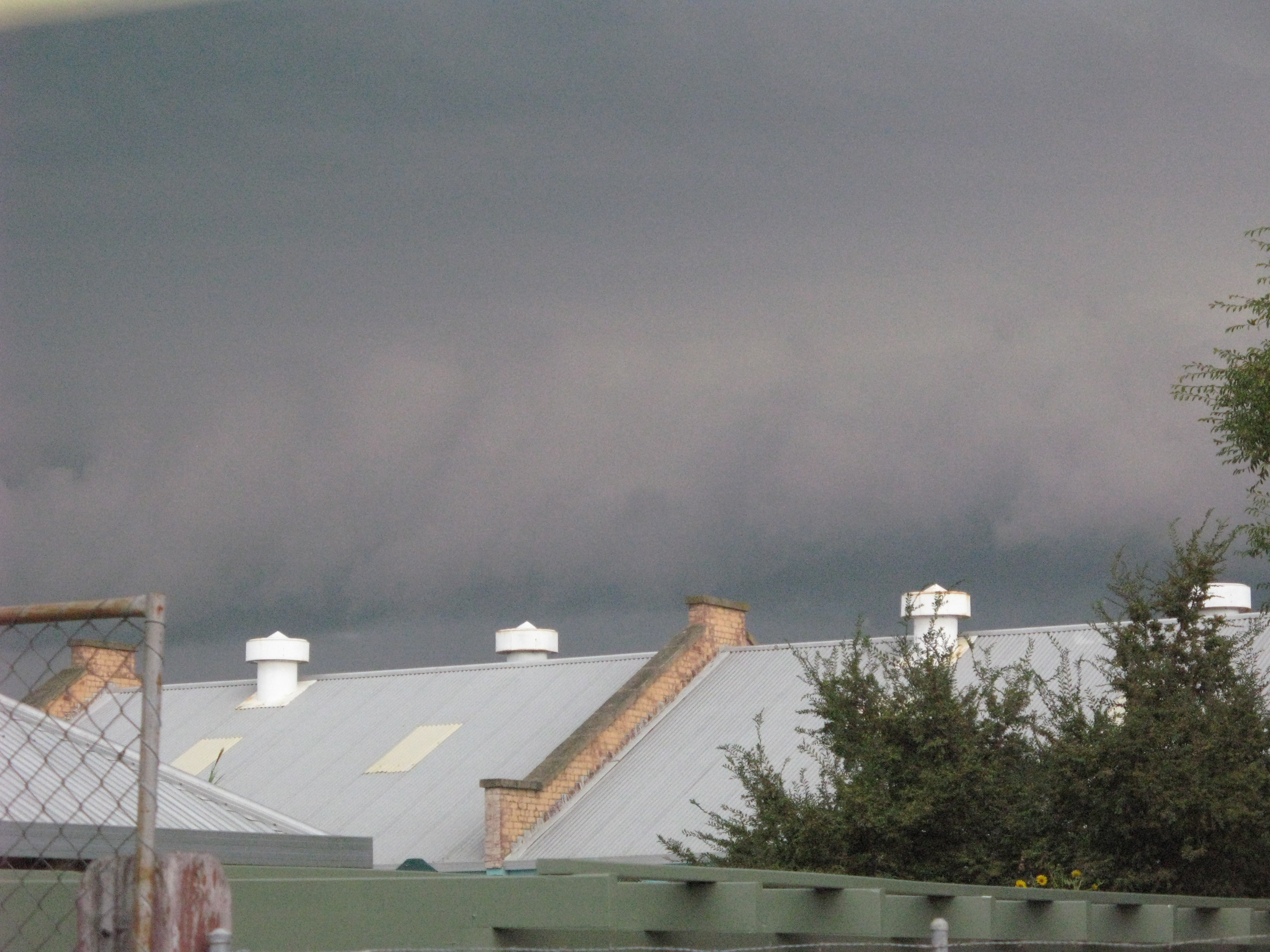
A shelf cloud approaching Perth city looking over Perth City Farm in East Perth at 3:53 pm local time

The 2010 Western Australian storms, also known as the "Storm of the Decade" were a series of storms that travelled over southwestern Western Australia on 21 and 22 March 2010. One of the more intense storm cells passed directly over the capital city of Perth between 3:30 pm and 5:00 pm on Monday 22 March 2010. As of 2024, it is still the costliest natural disaster in Western Australian history, with the damage bill estimated at A$1.08 billion.

The storms brought extensive hail, strong winds and heavy rain, causing extensive damage to vehicles, property and trees, and flash flooding, as well as the first significant rainfall in Perth since 20 November 2009. The hail stones are the largest ever known to have occurred in Perth and were around 3–6 centimetres (1.2–2.4 in) in diameter, which caused extensive damage to property across the city, including schools, hospitals, universities and power infrastructure. Wind gusts were recorded at around 120 kilometres per hour (75 mph). At the peak, around 158,000 homes in Perth, Mandurah and Bunbury lost electric power. Fixed-line telephone services to thousands of homes were interrupted until the next day, and the storms led to an estimated $200 million worth of insurance claims within three days, with $70 million within the first 24 hours. It was identified as the most expensive natural disaster in Western Australia's history, and was declared a natural disaster by the Premier, Colin Barnett, allowing federal and state funds to be used for disaster relief.

The storm brought an end to a lengthy dry spell in Perth, with 40.2 millimetres (1.58 in) of rain falling at Mount Lawley – the fifth highest daily rainfall recorded for a March day in Perth. Over half of this fell in just 10 minutes. This was the first significant rainfall since 20 November 2009; only 0.2 millimetres (0.01 in) had fallen in the entire period. It was similar to storms which struck Melbourne on 6 March 2010.

== Storm timeline ==
During the warmer summer months, low-level surface troughs normally cross over the west coast of Australia, which often leads to isolated thunderstorm development in inland Western Australia, only occasionally reaching the coast (such as on 20 December 2009, when a storm developed south of Perth and gave the city of Mandurah 2.8 millimetres (0.11 in) of rain for the month). However, on 21 and 22 March 2010, high surface dew points and temperatures combined with a low to the west of Western Australia to cause rare northerly winds to occur. This meant any storms that formed would be pushed southwards instead of the normal easterly pattern.

21 March 2010 Storms formed in the Geraldton region during the afternoon, putting an end to the city's fourth-longest dry spell, with 14.6 millimetres (0.57 in) of rainfall recorded at Geraldton. The township of Badgingarra (halfway between Perth and Geraldton) bore the brunt of storms on both days, receiving 27.6 millimetres (1.09 in). Storms also developed in inland parts of the Gascoyne, where Cue got over 80 millimetres (3.1 in) of rainfall and Mount Magnet received 57 millimetres (2.2 in).

22 March 2010 The Geraldton storm moved out towards the coast during the morning, skipping Perth, but not before putting an end to nearby Mandurah's dry spell with 2.4 millimetres (0.09 in) of rainfall and later Bunbury where 9 millimetres (0.35 in) fell. Seven pole-top fires cut power to 1,200 homes across both cities.

A severe thunderstorm warning was later declared for the central west (around Geraldton), lower west (including the cities Perth and Mandurah), central Wheatbelt, Great Southern and southern Gascoyne regions of Western Australia at 9.45 am. It was amended at 2.30 pm to indicate the threat to Perth.

As predicted, storms began to develop in the Jurien Bay area around 2 pm, bringing another 36.2 millimetres (1.43 in) to an already sodden Badgingarra. At 3 pm, the main storm moved over Gingin, dropping the temperature from 26.3 °C (79.3 °F) at 3:06 pm to 21.4 °C (70.5 °F) at 3:33 pm, and delivering 18.2 millimetres (0.72 in) to the township. Perth was next in line for the storms, which first hit the northern suburbs around the local government areas of Joondalup and Wanneroo, where 62.8 millimetres (2.47 in) fell in two hours at the suburb itself. Hailstones with diameters of 3–5 centimetres (1.2–2.0 in) were reported around suburbs like Osborne Park, Nollamara and Craigie, while 6 centimetres (2.4 in) hailstones were measured in the inner Perth suburb of Wembley.

By 4 pm, the Perth storm had reached the southern suburbs and damaging wind gusts had been reported at the suburb of Jandakot (96 kilometres per hour or 60 miles per hour). Jarrahdale, to the southeast of Perth, received 44.2 millimetres (1.74 in) in half an hour, exceeding the conditions required for a 1-in-100-year flood in terms of a period from 15 to 30 minutes. However, the storm began to lessen in intensity and become larger, forming a multi-squall line as it moved further south. A second wave of storm activity developed behind the first set, delivering further falls to northern Perth. Around 4.30 pm, a severe thunderstorm warning was issued for Mandurah and surrounding areas. However, the storm had begun to move further inland, resulting in no hail reported in Mandurah or Rockingham, and 17.4 millimetres (0.69 in) at Garden Island and 13.4 millimetres (0.53 in) Mandurah respectively while inland towns such as Dwellingup and Waroona received 30.2 millimetres (1.19 in) and 26.8 millimetres (1.06 in) respectively.

== Building damage ==
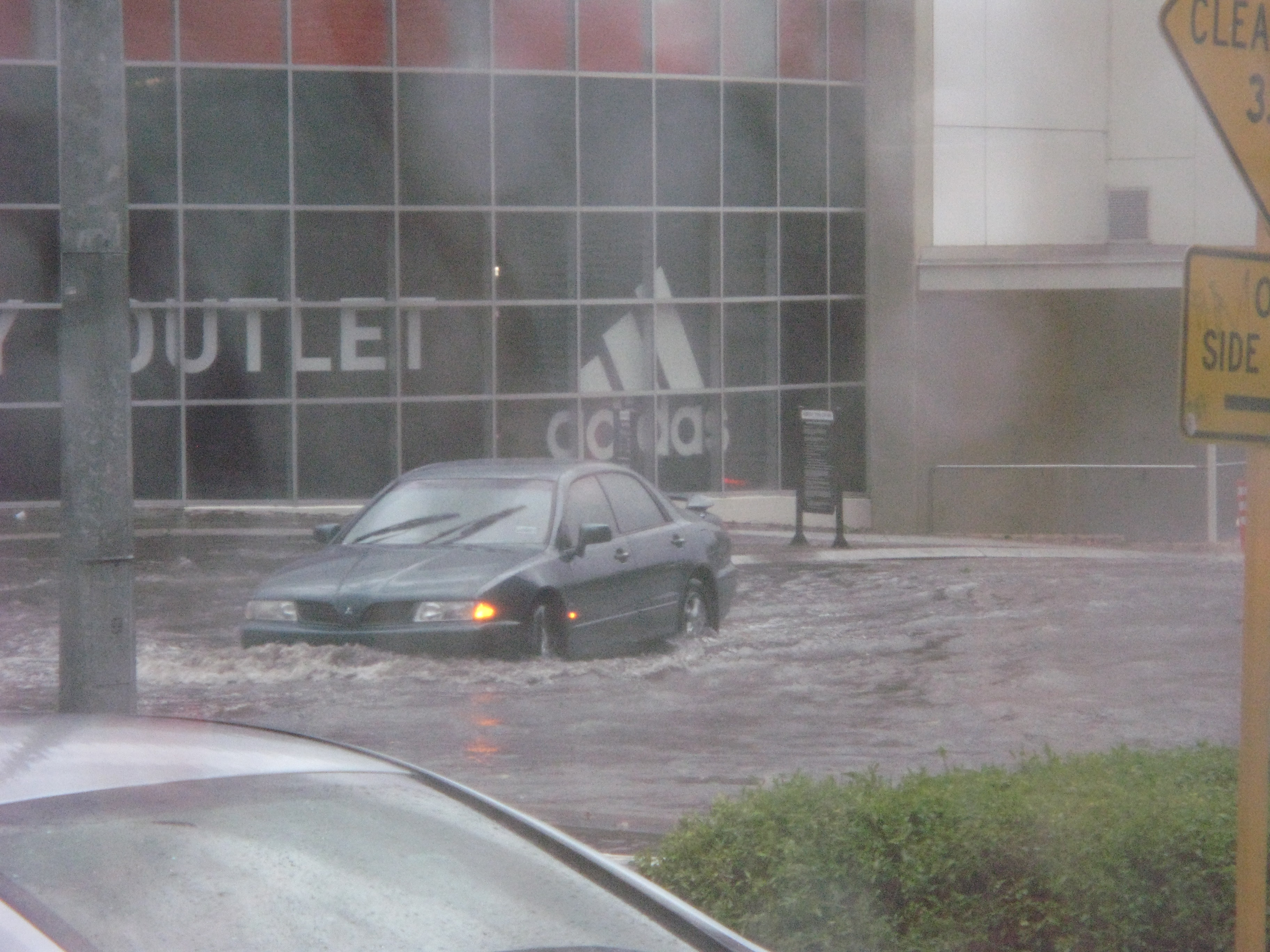
Flash flooding at an intersection in Wellington Street, Perth

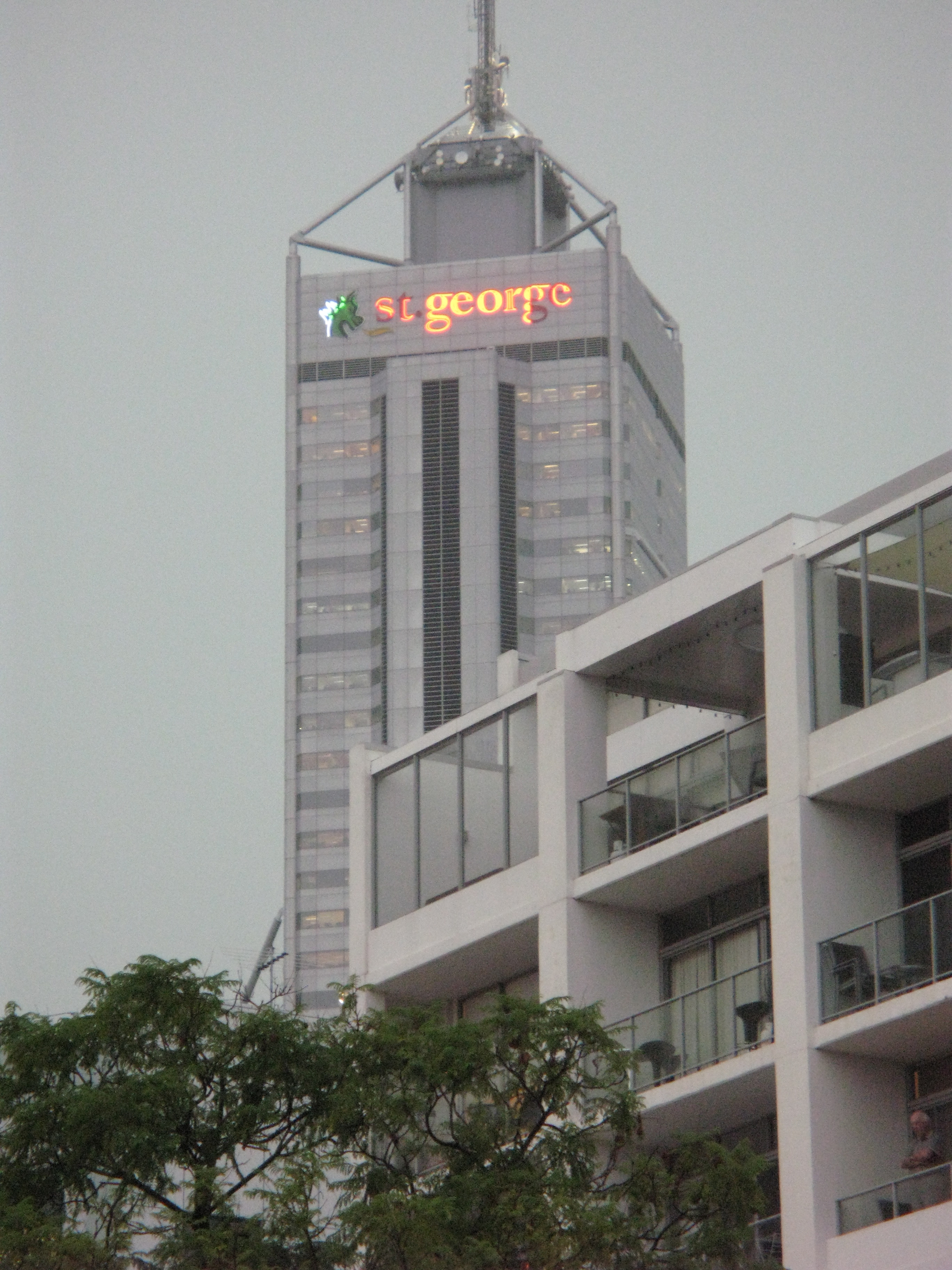
Damage to a sign on the Central Park skyscraper in Perth city caused by hail

Around 12,000 individual insurance claims were made in the 24 hours after the storms. The damage zone was defined by a loop from Geraldton to Mandurah through Cue, Merredin and Katanning. A week after the storm, the damage bill was estimated to have reached $650 million, and was still climbing, making it the most expensive catastrophe in Western Australian history.

Over 100 people were evacuated from apartments near Kings Park in central Perth after heavy rain cause a large mudslide.

Several high schools in Perth's northern suburbs did not open on 23 March due to extensive storm damage. According to the Education Department there was damage to about 70 per cent of classrooms at Ocean Reef High School. Shenton College, Mindarie Senior College, Duncraig Senior High School, Tuart College and Heathridge Primary School were also closed, as was Perth Modern School for students in years 8, 9 and 10.

== Car damage ==
Tens of thousands of cars were damaged by the hail. The cost of fixing the dented panels was high, owing to the hundreds of dents involved, so many of these damaged cars were written off by the insurance companies covering the damage. However, as these vehicles only suffered superficial damage they were often resold by insurance companies once minor repairs were conducted, leaving the dented panels unrepaired.

The storm dropped a lot of large hail on both a major vehicle retail area Osborne Park damaging millions of dollars of new and used cars (both directly and indirectly when buildings were damaged) and on the Kwinana Freeway.

== See also ==
- Severe storms in Australia
- 2010 Victorian storms
- Climate of Perth
- Extreme weather
