= Saginaw Aquifer =

The Saginaw Aquifer is a bedrock aquifer located in central Michigan in the United States. It is part of an aquifer system found in Mississippian or younger stratigraphic units in the Michigan Basin. The aquifer covers approximately 11,000 square miles (28,000 km^{2}) and is estimated to contain 4 cubic miles (17 km^{3}) of water, approximately 50 feet (15 m) to 400 feet (120 m) underground.

The aquifer contains both fresh water and salt water. In areas of the aquifer where fresh water is present, it is a primary source of municipal water, including in Clinton, Ingham and Eaton counties, encompassing the Lansing-East Lansing Metropolitan Area. Only about 0.03 percent of the aquifer is used for drinking, while the rest is for domestic and industrial use.

== See also ==
- List of aquifers
