= Leederville Aquifer =

Western Australian freshwater aquifer

The Leederville Aquifer is a significant freshwater aquifer located in the south west of Western Australia and predominantly beneath the Swan Coastal Plain west of the Darling Scarp.

It is located above the Yarragadee Aquifer, and beneath two superficial aquifers known as the Gnangara Mound and Jandakot Mound. These aquifers are separated by impervious layers with no groundwater, called aquitards.

The aquifer is several hundred meters thick and in some places reaches the surface. Water extracted from this aquifer is used in Perth's water supply. It is ultimately replenished by rainwater, however in recent years the state government has supplemented this by also pumping treated wastewater into the aquifer.

== See also ==
- Yarragadee Aquifer
- Climate of Perth
