= Schwyll Aquifer =

Coordinates: 51.491°N 3.548°W

Schwyll Aquifer (pronounced 'Shwill') was historically known as 'the Great Spring of Glamorgan'. Welsh Water uses the resurgence at the Schwyll Spring near Ewenny in the Vale of Glamorgan as the main source of water for the Bridgend area. Now functioning as a backup supply, it has a number of associated source protection zones policed by Natural Resources Wales.

The aquifer is an underground layer of water-bearing permeable rock. In this case, it consists of an underground waterway in the carboniferous limestone. Due to the delay between local heavy rain and discoloration of the water at the spring, it is believed that the origination is 20 miles away. This would locate the main source in the limestone of the southern edge of the Brecon Beacons. The lack of an access at the rising hinders exploration of the cave system. The only known point of access is at the pumping shaft of the extraction plant at Schwyll. The system was explored by cave divers in 1998 to 440 metres from the shaft. At 400 metres, a large cavern was discovered containing bones which were identified as horse. The bones were submitted for dating.

The outflow of the spring is far larger than any other spring in Wales and greater than that from the Wookey Hole or the Cheddar Gorge risings in England.

== See also ==
- Carboniferous Limestone § South Wales and Bristol area
