= Sunset Hospital =

Former hospital in Dalkeith, Western Australia

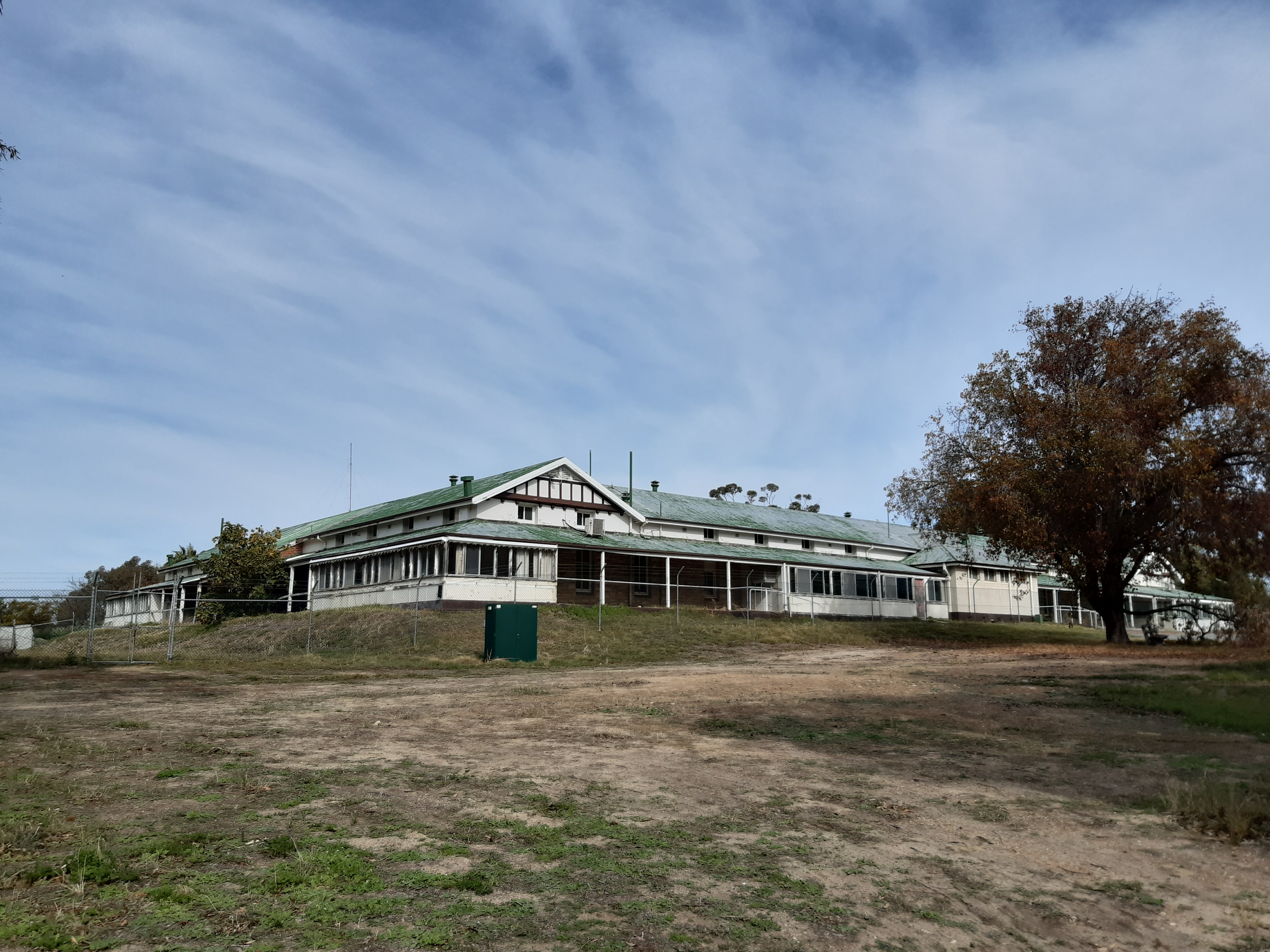
- Sunset Hospital in May 2020

Geography
- Location: Dalkeith, City of Nedlands, Western Australia, Australia
- Coordinates: 32°00′05″S 115°48′13″E

History
- Former names: Claremont Old Men's Home; Sunset Hospital (from 1943)
- Opened: 1906; 120 years ago
- Closed: 1995; 31 years ago

Links
- Lists: Hospitals in Australia
- Building details

General information
- Type: Heritage listed building

Western Australia Heritage Register
- Type: State Registered Place
- Designated: 2 September 1997
- Reference no.: 3374

Australian National Heritage List
- Official name: Sunset Hospital and Reserve
- Type: Historic
- Reference no.: 105913
- Place File Number: 5/11/018/0013

Sunset Hospital is a former hospital and aged care facility located in Dalkeith, Western Australia. Built in 1906 as the Claremont Old Men's Home, it once housed up to 750 men. The design was based on a military model, made from large stone blocks quarried from local limestone with accommodation for 400 men. It included an infirmary and a hospital.

== Design and function ==
The design comprised three main blocks. Each of these in turn had L-shaped dormitories with ablutions placed centrally in an inner quadrangle with two padded cells in B block. There was also a spacious dining room and laundry which had a further 2,000 square metres (0.5 acres) of washing line.

== Migration to Sunset ==
Its name was changed in 1943 to Sunset Hospital, and it was decommissioned in 1995. It was classified by the National Trust in 1993 and heritage listed in 1997.

On 10 January 2013, the Premier of Western Australia, Colin Barnett announced that the site of the former Sunset Hospital would be reopened to the community. A$275,000 was committed to renovate the 8.5 ha (21 acres) site. To pay for the restoration, 1,500 m^{2} (16,000 sq ft) of the site would be sold. Under the plan, all heritage listed buildings would be retained.
