= Sankoty Aquifer =

The Sankoty aquifer is an aquifer in the U.S. state of Illinois that provides groundwater to a number of communities in northwestern and central Illinois. It is an unconsolidated deposit lying in a bedrock valley formerly occupied by the ancestral Mississippi River.

== Type locality ==
The sand which forms the Sankoty aquifer was named after a railroad siding near Peoria, Illinois in 1946 by Leland Horberg. The legal description given by Horberg in identifying the type locality for the Sankoty sand is T9N, R8E, Section 15 (Peoria County, Illinois).

== Lithology and stratigraphy ==
The Sankoty sand is an unconsolidated deposit within a bedrock valley formerly occupied by the ancestral Mississippi River. It is classified as a member of the Banner Formation and occupies the same stratigraphic position as the Mahomet sand.

The Sankoty sand has distinctive characteristics that are readily recognized in sample cuttings. In its most typical aspect, the Sankoty is composed of 70 to 90 percent quartz grains of which 25 percent or more are pink, rounded, and polished. The texture is usually medium-grained but varies from silty fine sand to coarse gravelly sand.

== Groundwater occurrence ==
The Sankoty sand is one of the most extensive aquifers in the state. It frequently is 100 feet (30 m) thick and is typically found below elevations of 520 to 530 feet above sea level. It has been used as a water source in the Peoria area since at least 1892. By 1909, it was observed that groundwater levels at the North Field in Peoria fluctuated with the river stage in the Illinois River. The Sankoty aquifer extends beyond the width of the Illinois River valley and occurs beneath the uplands. In these locations, it is frequently confined by clayey deposits of glacial till (which may include other sands). Consequently, the groundwater may occur under confined (artesian) conditions.

Groundwater pumping has altered historical groundwater flow in the Sankoty aquifer. The flat geography of the area leads to groundwater flows that are perpendicular to the Illinois River; however, municipal groundwater pumping in the Peoria, Illinois area and to a lesser degree agricultural pumping elsewhere over the aquifer has led to numerous cones of depression.
