= Climate of Perth =

Perth

Climate chart (precipitation, max. and min. temperature)
J	F	M	A	M	J	J	A	S	O	N	D
17 31 18	13 32 18	20 30 17	36 26 14	86 22 11	127 20 9	147 19 8	123 19 9	79 21 10	40 24 12	24 27 14	9.4 30 17
- █ Average max. and min. temperatures in °C
- █ Precipitation totals in mm
- Source: BoM
Imperial conversion
J	F	M	A	M	J	J	A	S	O	N	D
0.7 89 65	0.5 89 65	0.8 85 62	1.4 79 57	3.4 72 51	5 67 48	5.8 65 47	4.8 67 47	3.1 69 49	1.6 74 53	1 80 58	0.4 85 62
- █ Average max. and min. temperatures in °F
- █ Precipitation totals in inches

Perth, the capital city of the state of Western Australia, has a Mediterranean climate (Köppen climate classification Csa), with hot, dry summers and mild, wet winters. February is the hottest month of the year, with an average high of 31.7 °C (89.1 °F), and July is the coldest month of the year, with an average low of 8.1 °C (46.6 °F). 77.7% of rain in Perth falls between May and September. Perth has an average of 8.8 hours of sunshine per day, which equates to around 3,200 hours of annual sunshine, and 138.7 clear days annually, making it the sunniest capital city in Australia.

== Classifications ==
Perth climate according to major climate systems
Climatic system	Initials	Description	Ref
Köppen climate classification	Csa	Hot-summer Mediterranean climate	
Trewartha system	Csal	Subtropical dry summer/Mediterranean, hottest month is "hot" (mean temperature of 25.0 °C (77.0 °F)), coldest month is "mild" (mean temperature of 13.2 °C (55.8 °F)).	
Alisov system	—N/a	Subtropical climate	
Strahler system	—N/a	Mediterranean climate	
Thornthwaite system	C1 B'3	Dry sub-humid mesothermal	
Neef system	—N/a	Subtropical (rainy winter, west side of continent)	

== Seasons ==
Seasons in Perth are officially defined as coinciding with calendar months, so summer starts on 1 December, autumn starts on 1 March, winter starts on 1 June and spring starts on 1 September. However, summer-like weather generally occurs from November to early April, and wintery weather can occur between May and September.

=== Summer ===
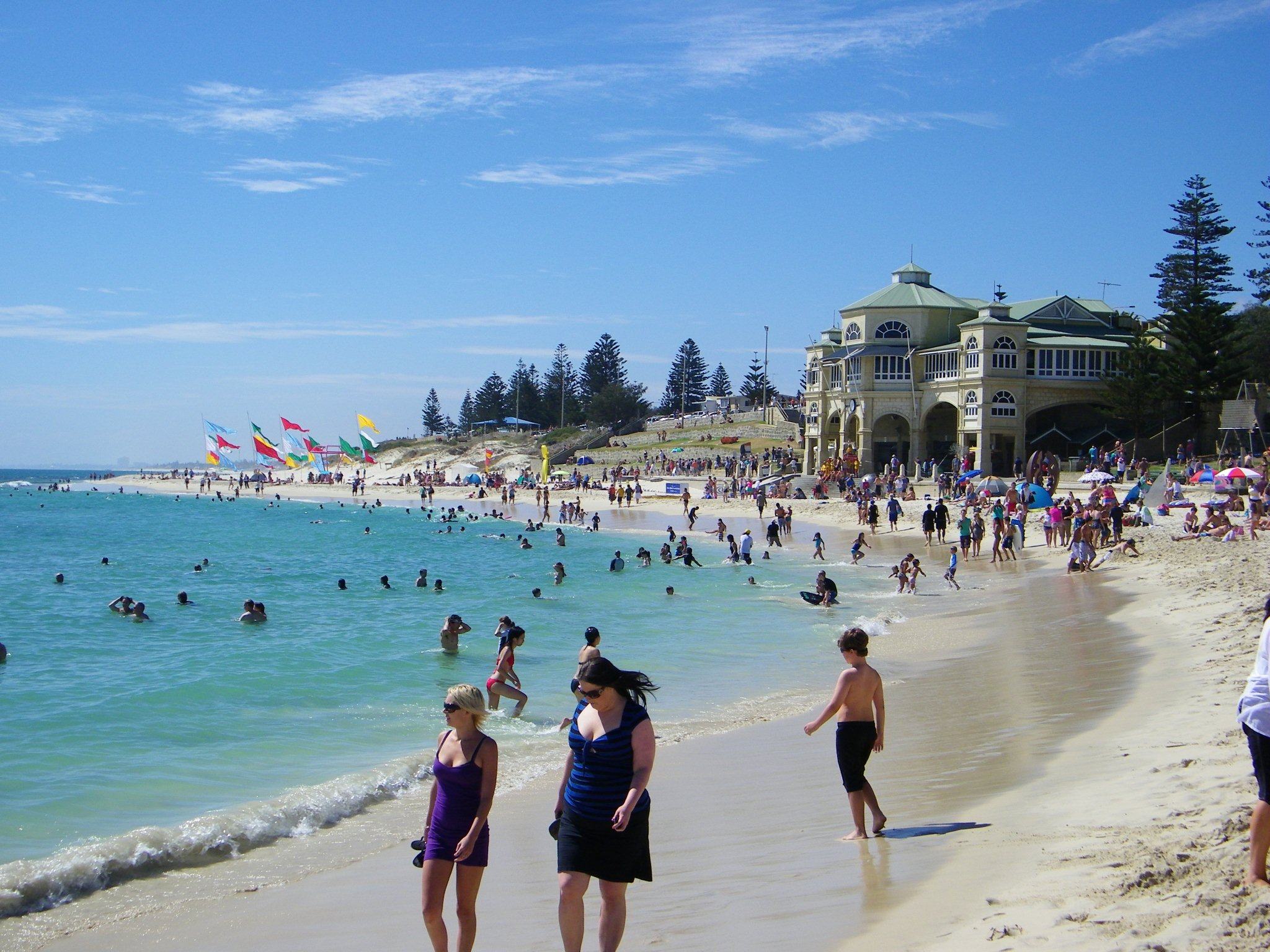
Beaches are popular places to visit in the summer. Pictured here is Cottesloe Beach

Summer is the time of year with the greatest temperature variation for Perth. Maximum temperatures usually range between 25 °C (77 °F) and 36 °C (97 °F), and minimum temperatures usually range between 14 °C (57 °F) and 22 °C (72 °F). The hottest month is February, with the hottest day of the month averaging 36.7 °C (98.1 °F), which is the second highest monthly maximum of the Australian capital cities, only behind Darwin. Humidity during summer is usually low, with an average 3 pm dew point of 12.9 °C (55.2 °F) in February. Perth has colder summer nights than Sydney, Brisbane, and Darwin, however, with the highest minimum monthly temperature being 18.4 °C (65.1 °F), in February.

On most summer afternoons, a sea breeze, known locally as the "Fremantle Doctor", blows from the southwest, providing relief from the hot north-easterly winds. Temperatures often fall below 30 °C (86 °F) a few hours after the arrival of the wind change. The average 3 pm wind speed for January at Swanbourne, on the coast is 27.7 km/h (17.2 mph), making afternoon beach visits sometimes unpleasant. Suburbs closer to the coast generally have lower maximum temperatures than suburbs further inland, as the sea breeze arrives later. When the sea breeze does not arrive, temperatures can reach above 38 °C (100 °F). The sea breeze is strongest in December and January, because the sea and land temperatures have a larger difference than in February and March.

Heat waves usually occur a few times per year where temperatures reach 38 °C (100 °F) and above. They are caused by slow moving high pressure systems that stay in the Great Australian Bight for a few days. They create north-easterly winds, which bring hot, dry air from the outback. The WA Department of Health defines a heat wave to be 3 or more consecutive days, where the forecast minimum and maximum temperatures average at least 36 °C (97 °F). The Bureau of Meteorology defines a heatwave to be three or more days of unusually high maximum and minimum temperatures. Temperatures above 35 °C (95 °F) occur on average 26 times per year, and temperatures above 40 °C (104 °F) occur on average 5 times each year. They occur most often in January and February, but they have been known to occur anytime between November and March. Most days above 40 °C (104 °F) only occur once or twice per heatwave. The most days in a row above 40 °C (104 °F) is six, which occurred from 18 to 23 January 2022. The most days in a single summer above 40 °C (104 °F) is 11, which occurred in the summer of 2021–22. Conversely, summers without a 40 °C (104 °F) day, while rare, have occurred three times in the 21st century: 2001–02, 2017–18 and 2022–23. The humidity for the most part is low when it is hot in Perth, but for the few days after a heatwave, winds are generally south to south-westerly, causing higher than usual humidity.

Visiting the beach is a common summertime activity for Perth, particularly during heatwaves. Sun protection should be used, because the average ultraviolet index during summer is 12 (extreme). The hot, dry and sometimes windy summer conditions in Perth causes bushfires to be common in and around Perth. Minor bushfires occur around Perth most summers, and occasionally major ones can occur as well, with losses of property and sometimes lives. An example of this is the 2014 Perth Hills Bushfire.

The highest temperature recorded for Perth is 46.2 °C (115.2 °F), on 23 February 1991, and the highest temperature recorded in the metropolitan region is 46.7 °C (116.1 °F), at Perth Airport on the same day. The highest minimum temperature recorded for Perth is 29.7 °C (85.5 °F), on 12 January 2014. The lowest maximum temperature recorded in summer for Perth is 14.9 °C (58.8 °F), on 17 December 1952, and the lowest minimum temperature recorded in summer for Perth is 6.6 °C (43.9 °F), on 1 December 2020.

Although summers are dry in Perth, they are not completely devoid of rain, with sporadic rainfall in the form of short-lived thunderstorms and cold fronts. The average rainfall for December to February is 43.1 mm (1.70 in), on 4.9 rain days. Tropical cyclones have never hit Perth, as the sea surface temperatures are too low for tropical cyclones to exist there, however remnants of ex-tropical cyclones from the north-west of Western Australia can bring heavy rain. This happens more often from late summer to mid autumn compared to early and mid summer.

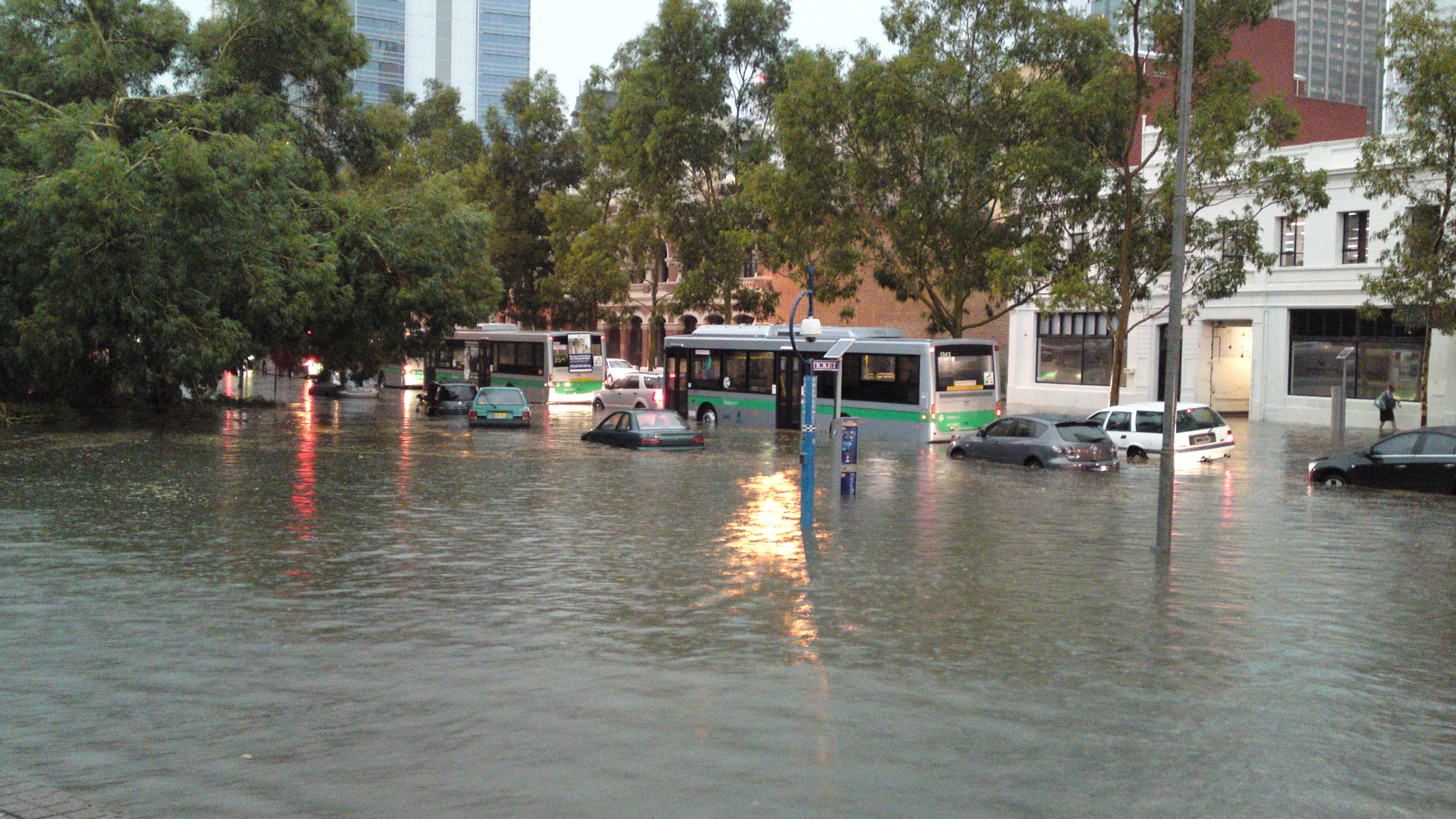
Flooding in Perth after the 2010 Western Australian storms

Summer has a greater number of extreme rainfall events than winter, and these have increased in number in recent years. Perth's highest one day rainfall totals are all during summer. Some notable examples of extreme weather in summer are:

- Slow-moving storms on 8 and 9 February 1992 that brought 120.6 millimetres (4.75 in) of rain to Perth, and 173 mm (6.8 in) of rain to Jandakot Airport, which is the highest one day rainfall total in the metropolitan region.
- 2010 Western Australian storms, which hit Perth on 22 March 2010. Perth recorded 40.2 mm (1.58 in) of rain, and large hail caused significant damage across the metropolitan area. This is the costliest natural disaster in Western Australian history, with the damage bill estimated at A$1.08 billion. This was the highest March one day rainfall total until it was broken in 2026.
- Heavy rainfall associated with a tropical low on 10 February 2017, which brought 114.4 millimetres (4.5 in) of rain. This is the highest one day rainfall total Perth has ever recorded.
- Remnants of ex-Tropical Cyclone Joyce on 15 January 2018, which brought 96.2 millimetres (3.79 in) of rain to Perth, and 142 mm (5.6 in) to Rottnest Island.
- The outer bands of the decaying Tropical Cyclone Narelle delivered 62.8 millimetres (2.47 in) to Perth and 102.8 millimetres (4.05 in) to neighbouring Mandurah on 28 March 2026, with minor flooding in the latter city reported.. This broke the March daily rainfall set in 2010.

Since the mid-1970s, Perth and south-west Western Australia have experienced a greater number of extreme rainfall events in the summer months.

=== Autumn ===
Autumn is a transitional season between summer and winter. Summer conditions can last until the middle of April, and wintery conditions can appear in May. Heat waves are still common in March, with temperatures above 38 °C (100 °F). March and April are the most common months for the remnants of ex-tropical cyclones to impact Perth, even more so than January and February. May is generally the first month where there is much rainfall typical of winter. The temperatures are also colder, but not as cold as winter, with days in the mid-20s still common.

The sea temperatures are at their hottest in autumn. Wind speeds are less than the wind speeds in spring and summer.

=== Winter ===
Perth has a smaller range in temperatures during winter, with maximum temperatures usually ranging between 16 °C (61 °F) and 22 °C (72 °F), and minimum temperatures usually ranging between 3 °C (37 °F) and 13 °C (55 °F). The coldest month is July, with an average maximum temperature of 18.4 °C (65.1 °F), which is lower than that of 2 other Australian capital cities: Brisbane and Darwin, and an average minimum temperature of 7.9 °C (46.2 °F), which is lower than that of Sydney, Brisbane and Darwin.

Frost can occasionally form in Perth. Temperatures below 2 °C (36 °F) happen on average four times per year. Temperatures below 0 °C (32 °F) happen on average once every five years. The lowest temperature ever recorded for Perth is −0.7 °C (30.7 °F), on 17 June 2006, and the lowest temperature ever recorded in the metropolitan region is −3.4 °C (25.9 °F) at Jandakot Airport on the same day. Jandakot Airport tends to be the coldest part of Perth during winter, with temperatures below 2 °C (36 °F) occurring on average 14.6 times per year, and temperatures below 0 °C (32 °F) occurring on average 3.5 times per year. The lowest maximum temperature recorded for Perth is 8.8 °C (47.8 °F), on 26 June 1956. The highest maximum temperature recorded in winter for Perth is 30 °C (86 °F), on 28 August 2019, and the highest minimum recorded in winter for Perth is 17.1 °C (62.8 °F), on 7 August 2013.

Perth receives significant rainfall during winter, with an average of 397.3 mm (15.64 in), on 47.6 rain days, between June and August. Generally rainy days receive much rain, and they are interspersed by many sunny, clear days. The rainiest area in the metropolitan region is in the Perth Hills. Bickley has an average winter rainfall of 591.7 mm (23.30 in), and Kalamunda has an average winter rainfall of 595.9 mm (23.46 in).

Perth's winter rainfall is influenced by the southern annular mode (SAM). When the SAM is positive, rainfall in Perth is decreased, and when the SAM is negative, rainfall in Perth is increased.

While snow has never been recorded in the Perth CBD, light snowfalls have been reported in outer suburbs of Perth in the Perth Hills around Kalamunda, Roleystone and Mundaring. The most recent snowfall was in 1968.

=== Spring ===
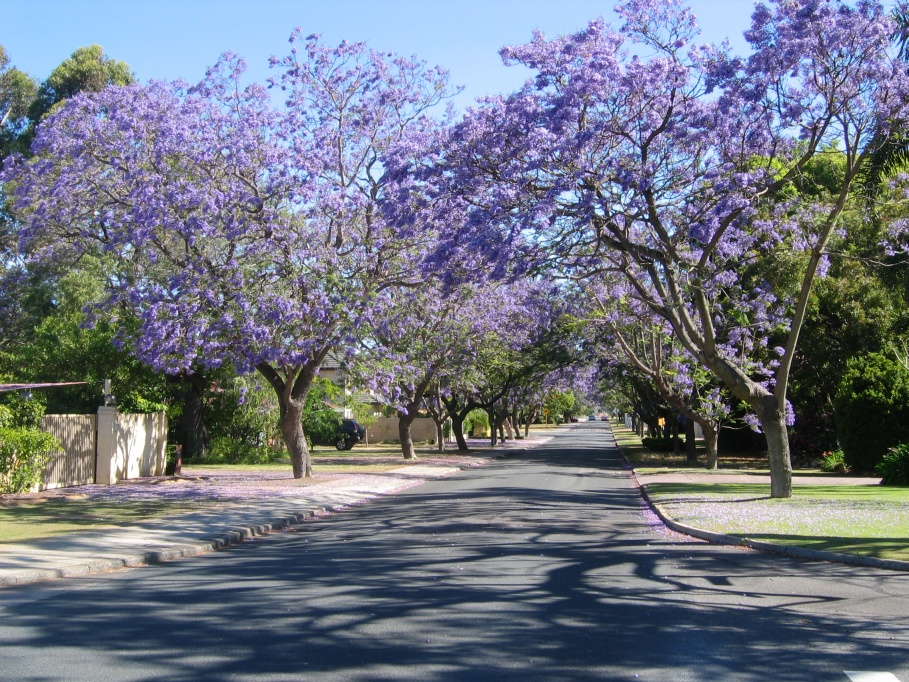
Jacarandas blooming in spring in Applecross

Spring is a transitional season between winter and summer. Cold weather still occurs during September, with an average low of 9.5 °C (49.1 °F), but with a few warmer days. Rainfall lessens and temperatures increase as spring goes by. By November, summer weather occurs again, with heatwaves occurring and little rain. The earliest day above 40 °C (104 °F) to occur in spring is 11 November 2003, when it hit 40.3 °C (104.5 °F).

Wind speeds are stronger in spring than autumn.

== Aboriginal seasons ==
The Noongar people live in the south west corner of Western Australia, including Perth. The Noongar calendar has six seasons. The months listed here are approximate, as the Noongar seasons are based on what is happening with the weather rather than dates on a calendar.

- Birak – December to January. Hot and dry. Easterly winds in the morning and sea breezes in the afternoon.
- Bunuru – February to March. Hottest part of the year with little to no rain. Hot easterly winds and cooling sea breeze on most afternoons close to the coast.
- Djeran – April to May. Cooler weather starts. Cool nights cause dew in the mornings. Lighter breezes from the south. Rainy days occur.
- Makuru – June to July. Coldest and wettest part of the year. More frequent storms occur.
- Djilba – August to September. Transitional time of year with a mix of cold, warm, rain and clear.
- Kambarang – October to November. Longer dry periods and warmer weather.

== Climate change ==
In 2090, Perth is predicted to have the rainfall of Yanchep today and the temperature of Geraldton today using the RCP 4.5 scenario. Rainfall is predicted to fall between 29% (226 mm) and 8% (66 mm) and temperature predicted to rise between 0.9 °C (1.6 °F) and 4 °C (7.2 °F). Perth may see the number of days above 35 °C (95 °F) increase from 28 per year on average to 36 in 2030, and to between 40 and 63 in 2090. While frost days will decrease, rainfall will increase in intensity while decreasing on average. Drought days in the south west as a whole may increase by as much as 80% versus 20% for Australia. The danger from fire will increase with more fire days for all of Western Australia.

== Weather stations ==
The official weather station for Perth is the Perth Metro station, which is operated by the Bureau of Meteorology (BoM) and opened in 1993. It is located 4 kilometres (2.5 miles) north of the Perth central business district and 11 km (6.8 mi) east of the Indian Ocean, in the suburb of Mount Lawley. Prior to that, Perth's official weather station was at the BoM Perth Regional Office in various different locations in Perth, West Perth and East Perth.

Perth main weather stations
Years open	Location
1876–1885	Old Treasury Building, Barrack Street, Perth
1885–1896	Perth Gardens, corner of Barrack Street and St Georges Terrace, Perth
1897–1963	Old Perth Observatory, Havelock Street, West Perth
1963–1967	Site of old Hale School, Havelock Street, West Perth
1967–1992	Corner of Hill Street and Bishops Row, East Perth
1993–present	Stancliffe Street, Mount Lawley

Other weather stations in the Perth metropolitan region are located at Perth Airport, Bickley, Garden Island, Gooseberry Hill, Hillarys Boat Harbour, Jandakot Airport, Millendon (Swan Valley), Bullsbrook (RAAF Base Pearce), Rottnest Island, Gosnells and Swanbourne.

== Climate data ==
Climate data for Perth
Month	Jan	Feb	Mar	Apr	May	Jun	Jul	Aug	Sep	Oct	Nov	Dec	Year
Record high °C (°F)	45.8 (114.4)	46.2 (115.2)	42.4 (108.3)	39.5 (103.1)	34.3 (93.7)	28.1 (82.6)	26.3 (79.3)	30.0 (86.0)	34.2 (93.6)	37.3 (99.1)	40.4 (104.7)	44.2 (111.6)	46.2 (115.2)
Mean maximum °C (°F)	40.4 (104.7)	40.1 (104.2)	38.6 (101.5)	33.9 (93.0)	28.7 (83.7)	24.2 (75.6)	22.7 (72.9)	24.5 (76.1)	27.3 (81.1)	33.0 (91.4)	36.9 (98.4)	39.5 (103.1)	41.8 (107.2)
Mean daily maximum °C (°F)	31.4 (88.5)	31.7 (89.1)	29.7 (85.5)	26.0 (78.8)	22.4 (72.3)	19.5 (67.1)	18.5 (65.3)	19.2 (66.6)	20.6 (69.1)	23.5 (74.3)	26.8 (80.2)	29.6 (85.3)	24.9 (76.8)
Mean daily minimum °C (°F)	18.1 (64.6)	18.4 (65.1)	16.9 (62.4)	13.8 (56.8)	10.5 (50.9)	8.7 (47.7)	8.1 (46.6)	8.5 (47.3)	9.7 (49.5)	11.7 (53.1)	14.4 (57.9)	16.6 (61.9)	13.0 (55.4)
Mean minimum °C (°F)	12.6 (54.7)	13.1 (55.6)	10.0 (50.0)	7.6 (45.7)	4.3 (39.7)	2.3 (36.1)	1.8 (35.2)	2.6 (36.7)	3.6 (38.5)	5.4 (41.7)	8.8 (47.8)	11.1 (52.0)	1.1 (34.0)
Record low °C (°F)	8.9 (48.0)	8.7 (47.7)	6.3 (43.3)	4.1 (39.4)	1.3 (34.3)	−0.7 (30.7)	0.0 (32.0)	1.3 (34.3)	1.0 (33.8)	2.2 (36.0)	5.0 (41.0)	6.6 (43.9)	−0.7 (30.7)
Average rainfall mm (inches)	16.7 (0.66)	13.1 (0.52)	20.0 (0.79)	35.9 (1.41)	86.2 (3.39)	127.1 (5.00)	147.0 (5.79)	122.7 (4.83)	79.3 (3.12)	39.5 (1.56)	24.2 (0.95)	9.4 (0.37)	723.9 (28.50)
Average precipitation days (≥ 1 mm)	1.5	1.2	2.6	4.7	8.7	11.8	14.8	13.1	10.7	5.7	3.8	1.8	80.4
Average afternoon relative humidity (%) (at 15:00)	39	38	40	46	50	56	57	54	53	47	44	41	47
Average dew point °C (°F)	12.6 (54.7)	12.7 (54.9)	11.7 (53.1)	11.0 (51.8)	9.7 (49.5)	8.7 (47.7)	8.0 (46.4)	7.9 (46.2)	8.3 (46.9)	8.8 (47.8)	10.1 (50.2)	11.1 (52.0)	10.0 (50.0)
Mean daily sunshine hours	11.5	11.0	9.6	8.3	6.9	5.9	6.1	7.2	7.7	9.6	10.6	11.5	8.8
Source: Bureau of Meteorology; Temperatures: 1993–2020; Extremes: 1897–2020; Rain data: 1993–2020; Relative humidity: 1994–2011

Climate data for Swanbourne
Month	Jan	Feb	Mar	Apr	May	Jun	Jul	Aug	Sep	Oct	Nov	Dec	Year
Record high °C (°F)	44.3 (111.7)	43.0 (109.4)	42.8 (109.0)	37.3 (99.1)	31.5 (88.7)	26.2 (79.2)	25.9 (78.6)	30.2 (86.4)	34.2 (93.6)	37.1 (98.8)	41.1 (106.0)	43.0 (109.4)	44.3 (111.7)
Mean maximum °C (°F)	39.5 (103.1)	39.6 (103.3)	38.2 (100.8)	33.2 (91.8)	27.9 (82.2)	23.9 (75.0)	22.5 (72.5)	23.7 (74.7)	26.5 (79.7)	31.8 (89.2)	35.8 (96.4)	38.3 (100.9)	41.2 (106.2)
Mean daily maximum °C (°F)	29.8 (85.6)	30.4 (86.7)	28.8 (83.8)	25.2 (77.4)	22.1 (71.8)	19.4 (66.9)	18.4 (65.1)	18.9 (66.0)	19.9 (67.8)	22.2 (72.0)	25.3 (77.5)	28 (82)	24.0 (75.2)
Mean daily minimum °C (°F)	18.3 (64.9)	18.7 (65.7)	17.6 (63.7)	15.2 (59.4)	12.5 (54.5)	10.7 (51.3)	9.9 (49.8)	10.1 (50.2)	11.0 (51.8)	12.4 (54.3)	14.7 (58.5)	16.7 (62.1)	14.0 (57.2)
Mean minimum °C (°F)	12.8 (55.0)	13.4 (56.1)	11.4 (52.5)	9.8 (49.6)	7.2 (45.0)	5.7 (42.3)	4.7 (40.5)	5.2 (41.4)	5.9 (42.6)	7.3 (45.1)	9.8 (49.6)	11.4 (52.5)	4.0 (39.2)
Record low °C (°F)	9.9 (49.8)	11.0 (51.8)	7.5 (45.5)	7.5 (45.5)	4.8 (40.6)	2.9 (37.2)	2.4 (36.3)	3.1 (37.6)	3.1 (37.6)	5.0 (41.0)	7.1 (44.8)	5.7 (42.3)	2.4 (36.3)
Average rainfall mm (inches)	17.5 (0.69)	12.5 (0.49)	22.0 (0.87)	39.9 (1.57)	88.0 (3.46)	128.5 (5.06)	152.7 (6.01)	118.9 (4.68)	79.3 (3.12)	44.5 (1.75)	22.4 (0.88)	10.2 (0.40)	734.5 (28.92)
Average precipitation days (≥ 1 mm)	1.2	1.0	2.6	4.8	8.8	12.5	15.4	13.2	10.8	6.1	3.5	1.8	81.7
Average afternoon relative humidity (%) (at 15:00)	55	54	52	57	59	62	63	63	62	59	58	54	58
Source: Bureau of Meteorology; Temperatures and rain data: 1993–2020; Relative humidity: 1993–2010

Climate data for Perth Airport
Month	Jan	Feb	Mar	Apr	May	Jun	Jul	Aug	Sep	Oct	Nov	Dec	Year
Record high °C (°F)	46.0 (114.8)	46.7 (116.1)	43.8 (110.8)	39.6 (103.3)	35.3 (95.5)	27.8 (82.0)	25.7 (78.3)	29.9 (85.8)	34.5 (94.1)	37.7 (99.9)	41.1 (106.0)	44.5 (112.1)	46.7 (116.1)
Mean maximum °C (°F)	41.0 (105.8)	40.4 (104.7)	38.6 (101.5)	33.2 (91.8)	28.4 (83.1)	23.5 (74.3)	22.1 (71.8)	23.9 (75.0)	27.2 (81.0)	32.2 (90.0)	36.2 (97.2)	39.3 (102.7)	42.1 (107.8)
Mean daily maximum °C (°F)	31.8 (89.2)	32.0 (89.6)	29.8 (85.6)	25.7 (78.3)	21.8 (71.2)	19.0 (66.2)	18.0 (64.4)	18.6 (65.5)	20.3 (68.5)	22.8 (73.0)	26.1 (79.0)	29.2 (84.6)	24.6 (76.3)
Mean daily minimum °C (°F)	17.1 (62.8)	17.6 (63.7)	16.0 (60.8)	13.0 (55.4)	10.4 (50.7)	9.0 (48.2)	8.1 (46.6)	8.1 (46.6)	8.9 (48.0)	10.3 (50.5)	12.8 (55.0)	15.0 (59.0)	12.2 (54.0)
Mean minimum °C (°F)	10.4 (50.7)	11.1 (52.0)	8.9 (48.0)	6.4 (43.5)	4.4 (39.9)	2.9 (37.2)	2.3 (36.1)	2.6 (36.7)	3.4 (38.1)	4.6 (40.3)	6.9 (44.4)	8.7 (47.7)	1.2 (34.2)
Record low °C (°F)	6.0 (42.8)	5.7 (42.3)	3.1 (37.6)	1.2 (34.2)	−0.4 (31.3)	−1.3 (29.7)	−1.0 (30.2)	0.1 (32.2)	−0.2 (31.6)	1.2 (34.2)	3.2 (37.8)	4.8 (40.6)	−1.3 (29.7)
Average rainfall mm (inches)	10.5 (0.41)	14.8 (0.58)	16.5 (0.65)	39.9 (1.57)	96.7 (3.81)	155.9 (6.14)	155.2 (6.11)	118.5 (4.67)	72.6 (2.86)	43.2 (1.70)	26 (1.0)	10.8 (0.43)	760.1 (29.93)
Average precipitation days (≥ 1 mm)	1.4	1.5	2.3	5.3	9.7	13.7	14.9	13	10.2	6.7	4.2	2.1	85
Average afternoon relative humidity (%) (at 15:00)	37	37	39	46	53	60	60	56	54	49	44	41	48
Mean daily sunshine hours	11.5	11.0	9.5	8.1	6.9	6.0	6.1	7.1	7.8	9.6	10.8	11.5	8.8
Source: Bureau of Meteorology; Temperatures and rain data: 1944–2020; Relative humidity: 1994–2010

Climate data for Gosnells
Month	Jan	Feb	Mar	Apr	May	Jun	Jul	Aug	Sep	Oct	Nov	Dec	Year
Record high °C (°F)	44.4 (111.9)	46.0 (114.8)	43.3 (109.9)	39.5 (103.1)	35.5 (95.9)	26.1 (79.0)	27.0 (80.6)	28.0 (82.4)	34.8 (94.6)	38.2 (100.8)	41.5 (106.7)	44.2 (111.6)	46.0 (114.8)
Mean maximum °C (°F)	41.5 (106.7)	40.9 (105.6)	39.2 (102.6)	34.1 (93.4)	29.0 (84.2)	24.3 (75.7)	23.3 (73.9)	24.9 (76.8)	27.9 (82.2)	33.4 (92.1)	37.5 (99.5)	40.2 (104.4)	42.7 (108.9)
Mean daily maximum °C (°F)	33.0 (91.4)	33.0 (91.4)	30.3 (86.5)	26.4 (79.5)	22.7 (72.9)	19.7 (67.5)	18.6 (65.5)	19.4 (66.9)	20.9 (69.6)	24.1 (75.4)	27.6 (81.7)	30.4 (86.7)	25.5 (77.9)
Mean daily minimum °C (°F)	18.6 (65.5)	18.9 (66.0)	17.3 (63.1)	14.7 (58.5)	11.8 (53.2)	9.8 (49.6)	8.9 (48.0)	9.0 (48.2)	10.1 (50.2)	11.8 (53.2)	14.5 (58.1)	16.4 (61.5)	13.5 (56.3)
Mean minimum °C (°F)	12.3 (54.1)	13.1 (55.6)	10.9 (51.6)	8.7 (47.7)	6.0 (42.8)	4.4 (39.9)	3.3 (37.9)	3.7 (38.7)	4.6 (40.3)	6.0 (42.8)	9.2 (48.6)	10.8 (51.4)	2.4 (36.3)
Record low °C (°F)	9.5 (49.1)	9.8 (49.6)	6.5 (43.7)	4.0 (39.2)	2.5 (36.5)	0.5 (32.9)	0.5 (32.9)	2.2 (36.0)	2.0 (35.6)	3.2 (37.8)	6.5 (43.7)	8.0 (46.4)	0.5 (32.9)
Average rainfall mm (inches)	10.2 (0.40)	15.2 (0.60)	16.3 (0.64)	40.6 (1.60)	99.5 (3.92)	160.5 (6.32)	155.8 (6.13)	120.2 (4.73)	77.9 (3.07)	43.9 (1.73)	29.1 (1.15)	11.0 (0.43)	776.9 (30.59)
Average precipitation days (≥ 1 mm)	1.4	1.5	2.5	4.8	8.9	11.7	13.3	11.4	9.1	5.8	3.8	1.9	76.1
Average afternoon relative humidity (%) (at 15:00)	38	37	41	48	53	61	61	60	56	49	46	41	49
Source: Bureau of Meteorology; Temperatures: 1991–2020; Rain data: 1961–2020; Relative humidity: 1992–2010

Climate data for Jandakot Airport
Month	Jan	Feb	Mar	Apr	May	Jun	Jul	Aug	Sep	Oct	Nov	Dec	Year
Record high °C (°F)	45.7 (114.3)	46.6 (115.9)	43.0 (109.4)	39.2 (102.6)	33.4 (92.1)	25.6 (78.1)	25.9 (78.6)	29.4 (84.9)	34.2 (93.6)	37.4 (99.3)	40.3 (104.5)	44.0 (111.2)	46.6 (115.9)
Mean maximum °C (°F)	40.3 (104.5)	40.2 (104.4)	38.5 (101.3)	33.5 (92.3)	28.2 (82.8)	23.7 (74.7)	22.3 (72.1)	24.0 (75.2)	26.9 (80.4)	32.2 (90.0)	36.6 (97.9)	39.2 (102.6)	42.0 (107.6)
Mean daily maximum °C (°F)	31.5 (88.7)	31.6 (88.9)	29.6 (85.3)	25.7 (78.3)	22.0 (71.6)	19.1 (66.4)	18.0 (64.4)	18.7 (65.7)	20.2 (68.4)	22.9 (73.2)	26.4 (79.5)	29.4 (84.9)	24.6 (76.3)
Mean daily minimum °C (°F)	16.9 (62.4)	17.2 (63.0)	15.7 (60.3)	12.5 (54.5)	9.4 (48.9)	7.6 (45.7)	7.1 (44.8)	7.3 (45.1)	8.3 (46.9)	9.8 (49.6)	12.7 (54.9)	14.9 (58.8)	11.6 (52.9)
Mean minimum °C (°F)	9.4 (48.9)	10.3 (50.5)	7.2 (45.0)	5.0 (41.0)	2.5 (36.5)	1.0 (33.8)	−0.1 (31.8)	0.8 (33.4)	1.6 (34.9)	3.0 (37.4)	5.8 (42.4)	7.9 (46.2)	−0.9 (30.4)
Record low °C (°F)	4.7 (40.5)	6.5 (43.7)	1.6 (34.9)	2.3 (36.1)	−0.6 (30.9)	−3.4 (25.9)	−2.8 (27.0)	−1.4 (29.5)	−1.3 (29.7)	−1.0 (30.2)	0.8 (33.4)	3.2 (37.8)	−3.4 (25.9)
Average rainfall mm (inches)	15.1 (0.59)	17.4 (0.69)	17.1 (0.67)	41.5 (1.63)	104.2 (4.10)	150.9 (5.94)	174.4 (6.87)	128.8 (5.07)	83.2 (3.28)	46.9 (1.85)	27.7 (1.09)	10.0 (0.39)	811.5 (31.95)
Average precipitation days (≥ 1 mm)	1.4	1.4	2.4	4.8	9.7	13.0	15.1	13.0	13.5	6.5	3.9	1.8	83.3
Average afternoon relative humidity (%) (at 15:00)	37	36	38	45	51	57	58	55	53	48	43	39	47
Source: Bureau of Meteorology; Temperatures: 1989–2020; Rain data: 1972–2020; Relative humidity: 1990–2010

Climate data for Bickley (Perth Hills)
Month	Jan	Feb	Mar	Apr	May	Jun	Jul	Aug	Sep	Oct	Nov	Dec	Year
Record high °C (°F)	41.8 (107.2)	42.0 (107.6)	41.0 (105.8)	36.5 (97.7)	31.0 (87.8)	22.0 (71.6)	22.0 (71.6)	26.6 (79.9)	30.5 (86.9)	35.8 (96.4)	38.9 (102.0)	41.0 (105.8)	42.0 (107.6)
Mean maximum °C (°F)	38.9 (102.0)	38.3 (100.9)	36.8 (98.2)	31.2 (88.2)	25.8 (78.4)	20.9 (69.6)	19.5 (67.1)	21.5 (70.7)	24.8 (76.6)	30.8 (87.4)	34.6 (94.3)	37.8 (100.0)	39.9 (103.8)
Mean daily maximum °C (°F)	30.6 (87.1)	30.5 (86.9)	27.9 (82.2)	23.5 (74.3)	19.3 (66.7)	16.1 (61.0)	15.1 (59.2)	16.0 (60.8)	17.7 (63.9)	21.1 (70.0)	24.9 (76.8)	28.3 (82.9)	22.6 (72.7)
Mean daily minimum °C (°F)	15.4 (59.7)	15.9 (60.6)	14.7 (58.5)	12.7 (54.9)	10.1 (50.2)	8.2 (46.8)	7.3 (45.1)	7.6 (45.7)	8.3 (46.9)	9.7 (49.5)	11.8 (53.2)	13.8 (56.8)	11.3 (52.3)
Mean minimum °C (°F)	9.8 (49.6)	10.3 (50.5)	8.9 (48.0)	7.4 (45.3)	5.5 (41.9)	3.9 (39.0)	3.0 (37.4)	3.2 (37.8)	3.5 (38.3)	4.9 (40.8)	7.0 (44.6)	8.4 (47.1)	2.4 (36.3)
Record low °C (°F)	8.0 (46.4)	8.0 (46.4)	5.0 (41.0)	4.4 (39.9)	3.0 (37.4)	2.4 (36.3)	1.0 (33.8)	1.0 (33.8)	1.0 (33.8)	3.0 (37.4)	4.0 (39.2)	5.0 (41.0)	1.0 (33.8)
Average rainfall mm (inches)	19.5 (0.77)	20.9 (0.82)	27.3 (1.07)	55.4 (2.18)	129.7 (5.11)	196.8 (7.75)	219.1 (8.63)	176.5 (6.95)	123.3 (4.85)	66.9 (2.63)	42.4 (1.67)	14.1 (0.56)	1,096.1 (43.15)
Average precipitation days (≥ 1 mm)	1.9	2.0	2.8	5.3	9.5	13.0	14.6	13.1	10.6	7.2	4.8	2.1	86.9
Average afternoon relative humidity (%) (at 15:00)	35	34	39	49	58	67	68	65	60	51	44	38	51
Source: Bureau of Meteorology; Temperatures: 1994–2020; Rain data: 1969–2020; Relative humidity: 1994–2010

Climate data for Rottnest Island
Month	Jan	Feb	Mar	Apr	May	Jun	Jul	Aug	Sep	Oct	Nov	Dec	Year
Record high °C (°F)	41.1 (106.0)	41.5 (106.7)	40.8 (105.4)	35.2 (95.4)	29.2 (84.6)	24.9 (76.8)	23.4 (74.1)	25.3 (77.5)	30.8 (87.4)	35.2 (95.4)	36.6 (97.9)	40.6 (105.1)	41.5 (106.7)
Mean maximum °C (°F)	36.5 (97.7)	36.1 (97.0)	35.3 (95.5)	30.4 (86.7)	25.8 (78.4)	22.3 (72.1)	21.2 (70.2)	21.6 (70.9)	24.0 (75.2)	28.8 (83.8)	32.5 (90.5)	35.3 (95.5)	38.8 (101.8)
Mean daily maximum °C (°F)	26.6 (79.9)	27.2 (81.0)	26.1 (79.0)	23.7 (74.7)	21.1 (70.0)	18.8 (65.8)	17.9 (64.2)	17.9 (64.2)	18.9 (66.0)	20.6 (69.1)	23.0 (73.4)	25.2 (77.4)	22.3 (72.1)
Mean daily minimum °C (°F)	19.1 (66.4)	19.5 (67.1)	18.8 (65.8)	17.3 (63.1)	15.2 (59.4)	13.4 (56.1)	12.5 (54.5)	12.4 (54.3)	12.9 (55.2)	14.0 (57.2)	15.9 (60.6)	17.7 (63.9)	15.7 (60.3)
Mean minimum °C (°F)	15.1 (59.2)	15.3 (59.5)	14.2 (57.6)	13.1 (55.6)	11.1 (52.0)	9.9 (49.8)	8.8 (47.8)	8.7 (47.7)	8.8 (47.8)	10.0 (50.0)	11.5 (52.7)	13.4 (56.1)	7.8 (46.0)
Record low °C (°F)	11.3 (52.3)	10.9 (51.6)	9.5 (49.1)	10.3 (50.5)	8.8 (47.8)	7.0 (44.6)	6.6 (43.9)	6.2 (43.2)	6.7 (44.1)	7.2 (45.0)	6.6 (43.9)	10.8 (51.4)	6.2 (43.2)
Average rainfall mm (inches)	14.5 (0.57)	10.9 (0.43)	19.0 (0.75)	33.7 (1.33)	71.3 (2.81)	100.5 (3.96)	112.7 (4.44)	87.4 (3.44)	52.6 (2.07)	28.1 (1.11)	19.5 (0.77)	10.3 (0.41)	564.5 (22.22)
Average precipitation days (≥ 1 mm)	1.1	1.0	2.4	4.8	8.2	11.4	14.3	13.1	9.5	5.2	3.5	1.7	76.2
Average afternoon relative humidity (%) (at 15:00)	63	61	60	61	60	63	64	64	64	63	63	61	62
Source: Bureau of Meteorology; Temperatures and rain data: 1983–2020; Relative humidity: 1991–2010

Climate data for RAAF Base Pearce (Bullsbrook)
Month	Jan	Feb	Mar	Apr	May	Jun	Jul	Aug	Sep	Oct	Nov	Dec	Year
Record high °C (°F)	46.0 (114.8)	45.7 (114.3)	42.9 (109.2)	40.7 (105.3)	35.4 (95.7)	27.2 (81.0)	29.6 (85.3)	29.6 (85.3)	33.0 (91.4)	38.0 (100.4)	43.1 (109.6)	44.2 (111.6)	46.0 (114.8)
Mean maximum °C (°F)	41.9 (107.4)	41.6 (106.9)	39.1 (102.4)	34.0 (93.2)	28.9 (84.0)	23.5 (74.3)	22.2 (72.0)	23.7 (74.7)	26.8 (80.2)	32.7 (90.9)	36.9 (98.4)	39.9 (103.8)	43.4 (110.1)
Mean daily maximum °C (°F)	33.6 (92.5)	33.3 (91.9)	30.6 (87.1)	26.4 (79.5)	22.1 (71.8)	19.0 (66.2)	17.9 (64.2)	18.4 (65.1)	20.2 (68.4)	23.6 (74.5)	27.3 (81.1)	30.6 (87.1)	25.2 (77.4)
Mean daily minimum °C (°F)	17.0 (62.6)	17.6 (63.7)	16.1 (61.0)	13.3 (55.9)	10.7 (51.3)	9.3 (48.7)	8.4 (47.1)	8.2 (46.8)	8.8 (47.8)	10.2 (50.4)	12.6 (54.7)	14.7 (58.5)	12.2 (54.0)
Mean minimum °C (°F)	11.0 (51.8)	11.3 (52.3)	8.8 (47.8)	7.1 (44.8)	4.2 (39.6)	3.0 (37.4)	2.4 (36.3)	2.7 (36.9)	3.8 (38.8)	4.9 (40.8)	6.8 (44.2)	8.7 (47.7)	1.2 (34.2)
Record low °C (°F)	7.4 (45.3)	6.8 (44.2)	4.5 (40.1)	2.0 (35.6)	−0.6 (30.9)	−2.9 (26.8)	−1.9 (28.6)	0.5 (32.9)	0.5 (32.9)	1.2 (34.2)	2.8 (37.0)	5.3 (41.5)	−2.9 (26.8)
Average rainfall mm (inches)	10.0 (0.39)	12.9 (0.51)	16.4 (0.65)	33.9 (1.33)	82.3 (3.24)	130.1 (5.12)	134.3 (5.29)	106.8 (4.20)	67.6 (2.66)	37.1 (1.46)	22.2 (0.87)	10.7 (0.42)	675.8 (26.61)
Average precipitation days (≥ 1 mm)	0.8	1.2	1.7	3.6	6.6	9.1	10.2	9.3	7.1	4.6	2.8	1.3	58.3
Average afternoon relative humidity (%) (at 15:00)	30	31	35	43	60	60	61	57	54	46	39	33	46
Source: Bureau of Meteorology; Temperatures: 1940–2020; Rain data: 1937–2020; Relative humidity: 1944–2011

=== Daylight ===
Climate data for Perth
Month	Jan	Feb	Mar	Apr	May	Jun	Jul	Aug	Sep	Oct	Nov	Dec	Year
Mean daily daylight hours	14.0	13.0	12.0	11.0	10.0	10.0	10.0	11.0	12.0	13.0	14.0	14.0	12.0
Source: Bureau of Meteorology (daylight hours)

=== UV Index ===
Climate data for Perth
Month	Jan	Feb	Mar	Apr	May	Jun	Jul	Aug	Sep	Oct	Nov	Dec	Year
Average ultraviolet index	12	11	9	6	4	2	3	4	6	8	10	12	7.2
Source: Bureau of Meteorology (UV index)

=== Sea temperature ===
Climate data for Perth
Month	Jan	Feb	Mar	Apr	May	Jun	Jul	Aug	Sep	Oct	Nov	Dec	Year
Average sea temperature °C (°F)	21.0 (69.8)	21.6 (70.9)	21.8 (71.2)	21.3 (70.3)	21.1 (70.0)	20.3 (68.5)	20.1 (68.2)	19.2 (66.6)	18.7 (65.7)	19.1 (66.4)	20.3 (68.5)	20.1 (68.2)	20.4 (68.7)
Source: METOC (sea temperature)

== See also ==
- Climate change in Australia
- Climate of Australia
- Environment of Australia
