= Yarragadee Aquifer =

The Yarragadee Aquifer is a significant freshwater aquifer located in the south west of Western Australia and predominantly beneath the Swan Coastal Plain west of the Darling Scarp. It has a north–south range from about Geraldton to the south coast, but with a split in the formation south of Perth, Western Australia. The southern part is known as the South West Yarragadee Aquifer.

The aquifer is quite deep, situated hundreds of metres below ground level and with a thickness ranging up to about two kilometres.

In the Perth area, the Yarragadee Aquifer is located beneath the Leederville Aquifer, which itself is located beneath two superficial aquifers known as the Gnangara Mound and Jandakot Mound. These aquifers are separated by impervious layers with no groundwater, called aquitards.

The Yarragadee Aquifer stores about 1000 cubic kilometres of water, compared to about 20 cubic kilometres in the Gnangara Mound. As such it is seen as a potential source of water, and the Water Corporation of Western Australia currently extracts about 45 gigalitres per year from the aquifer. One cubic kilometre is equivalent to 1000 GL.

Ultimately the Yaragadee Aquifer is replenished by rainfall. This recharging is usually where there are outcroppings near other aquifers like the Leederville Aquifer. There are also outcrops near the surface in the vicinity of the Blackwood River. Current models estimate this recharge at about 280 to 340 GL per year. This groundwater can remain in the aquifer for many years; in some areas the age of the groundwater is over 30,000 years.

Geologically, the aquifer is part of what is known as the Yarragadee Formation, which is a relatively thick geological unit in the Perth Basin. Formed during the Jurassic Period, the Yarragadee Formation is composed primarily of non-marine fluviatile feldspathic, poorly sorted sandstones which are porous and poorly cemented, hence allowing for considerable groundwater reserves. It grades from a shale-siltstone dominated base to a cleaner sandstone in the upper portions of the formation, probably representing increased subsidence or filling of the basin during the late Jurassic.

The Dalkeith Hot Pool was formed by water from the Yarragadee Aquifer.
