= Purapurani Aquifer =

Natural reservoir of underground water

Purapurani Aquifer is a natural reservoir of underground water extending across the Bolivian municipalities of El Alto, Laja, Pucarani and Viacha in the Altiplano. The aquifer has its recharge area in its northern fringes. The water supply of La Paz, El Alto and Viacha depends on the aquifer. Some of its shallow waters in the north are contaminated.
