= Dalkeith, Western Australia =

Dalkeith
- Suburb
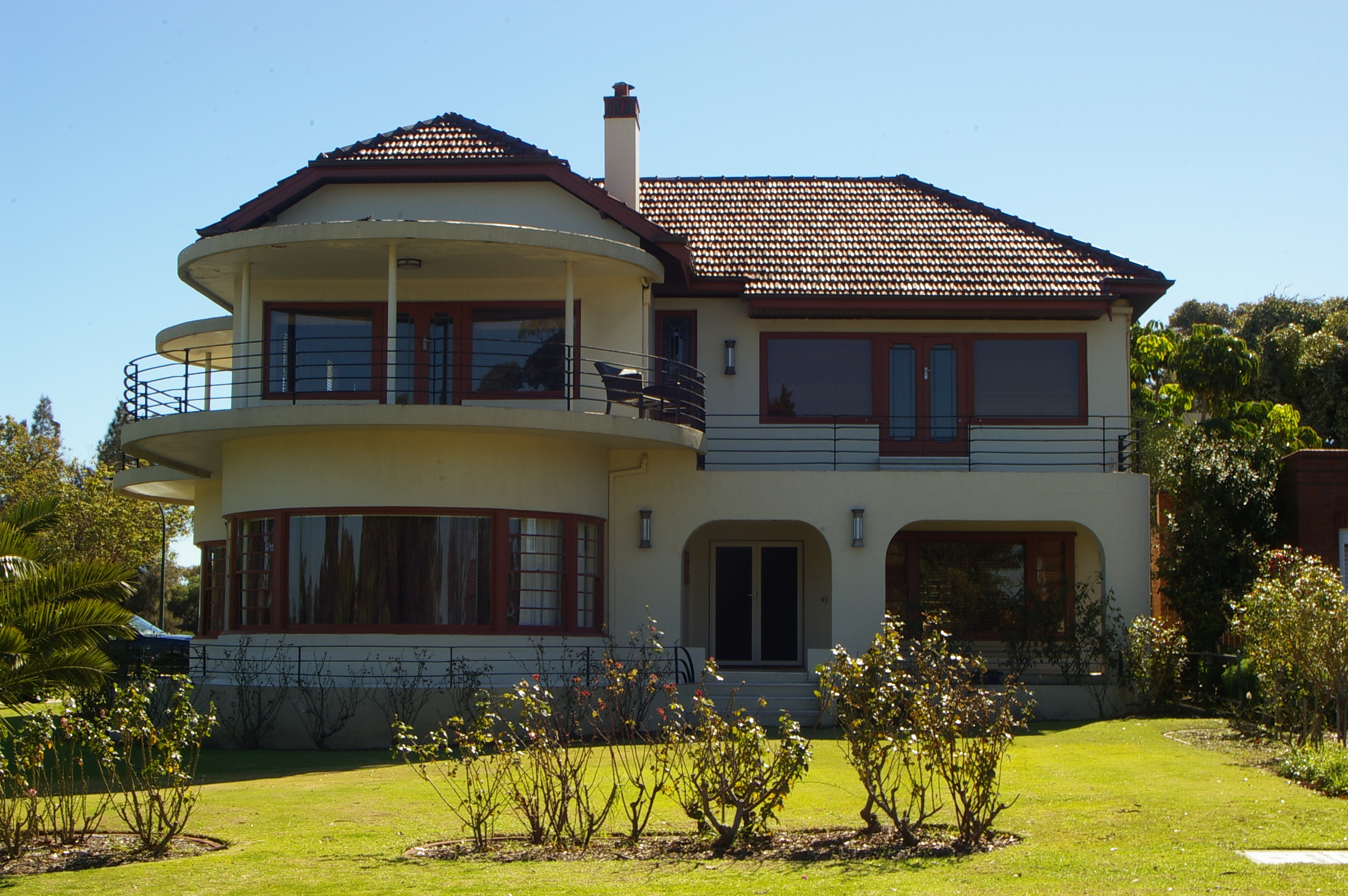
- Kylemore, on Jutland Parade, built 1938
- Interactive map of Dalkeith
- Coordinates: 31.997°S 115.797°E
- Country: Australia
- State: Western Australia
- City: Perth
- LGA: City of Nedlands
- Location: 6 km (3.7 mi) SW of Perth CBD
- Established: 1897

Government
  - State electorate: Nedlands
  - Federal division: Curtin

Population
  - Total: 4,398 (SAL 2021)
- Postcode: 6009
Suburbs around Dalkeith
Claremont	Nedlands	Nedlands
Swan River	Dalkeith	Swan River
	Swan River

Dalkeith is an affluent suburb of Perth, Western Australia within the City of Nedlands. It is also the richest suburb in Perth. This suburb had a median house price of $2.9 million in 2021.

== History ==
The suburb takes its name from a cottage built in 1833 by Captain Adam Armstrong and his sons, early settlers of the area who arrived aboard Gilmore. Armstrong, previously the manager of the Earl of Dalkeith's estate in Scotland, named the house "Dalkeith Cottage". The cottage was on a farm bought by James Gallop, who built a two-storey house c. 1872, now known as Gallop House. In 1897 the farm was sold off in lots for residential use. The house was bought by the state government in 1911, and was neglected for several decades before being restored in 1963/64. It is the oldest extant private residence in Dalkeith and the City of Nedlands. The suburb is also surrounded on three sides by the Swan River. As at 2021, Dalkeith was the most expensive suburb for houses in Western Australia, with a median price of $2.9 million. Jutland Parade is the most expensive street in Dalkeith and considered one of the most expensive streets in Perth.

At the riverside lies Sunset Hospital, built in 1904 and closed in 1995. Several of the buildings are heritage listed. In 2005 the University of Western Australia entered into an agreement with the state government to redevelop the site, including a museum, aged care and residential apartments. In September 2007 UWA withdrew from the agreement, citing delays and restrictions caused by the heritage status of the site.

== Secession ==
In early 2009, residents of Dalkeith formed a movement to secede from the City of Nedlands and form their own local government area, ostensibly the Shire of Dalkeith. The residents suggested secession as economically viable - the Shire of Peppermint Grove, the smallest local government area in Australia, was established in 1895 and currently has about 1,600 residents, whereas Dalkeith currently has over 4,000.

== Notable residents ==
Notable residents include Gina Rinehart, Kerry Stokes, Michael Bambang Hartono, Malcolm McCusker and Angela Bennett.

== Transport ==
Dalkeith is served by Transperth bus routes 23 and 24.
