= Balanegra Aquifer =

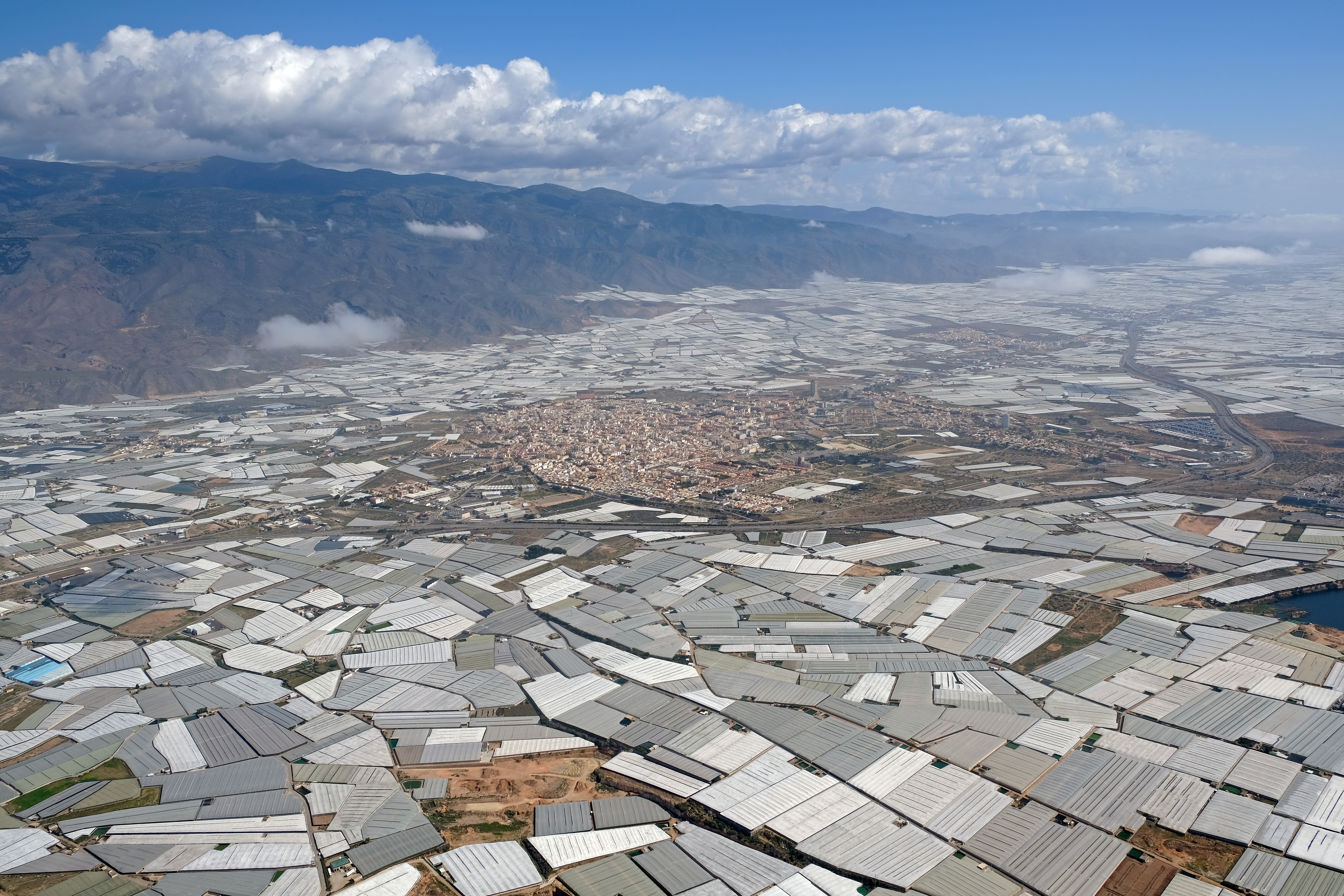
Coastal plain in Poniente Almeriense where the aquifer lies.

Balanegra Aquifer is an aquifer on a coastal plain in southern Spain. It lies in an area of dolomite rock. The aquifer have had problems of saltwater intrusion due to overexploitation but some areas are more protected from seawater intrusions than others since sediments of Neogene age locally separates dolomite from seawater.
