= Alnarpsströmmen =

Aquifer in Sweden

Coordinates: 55°39′34″N 013°18′58″E

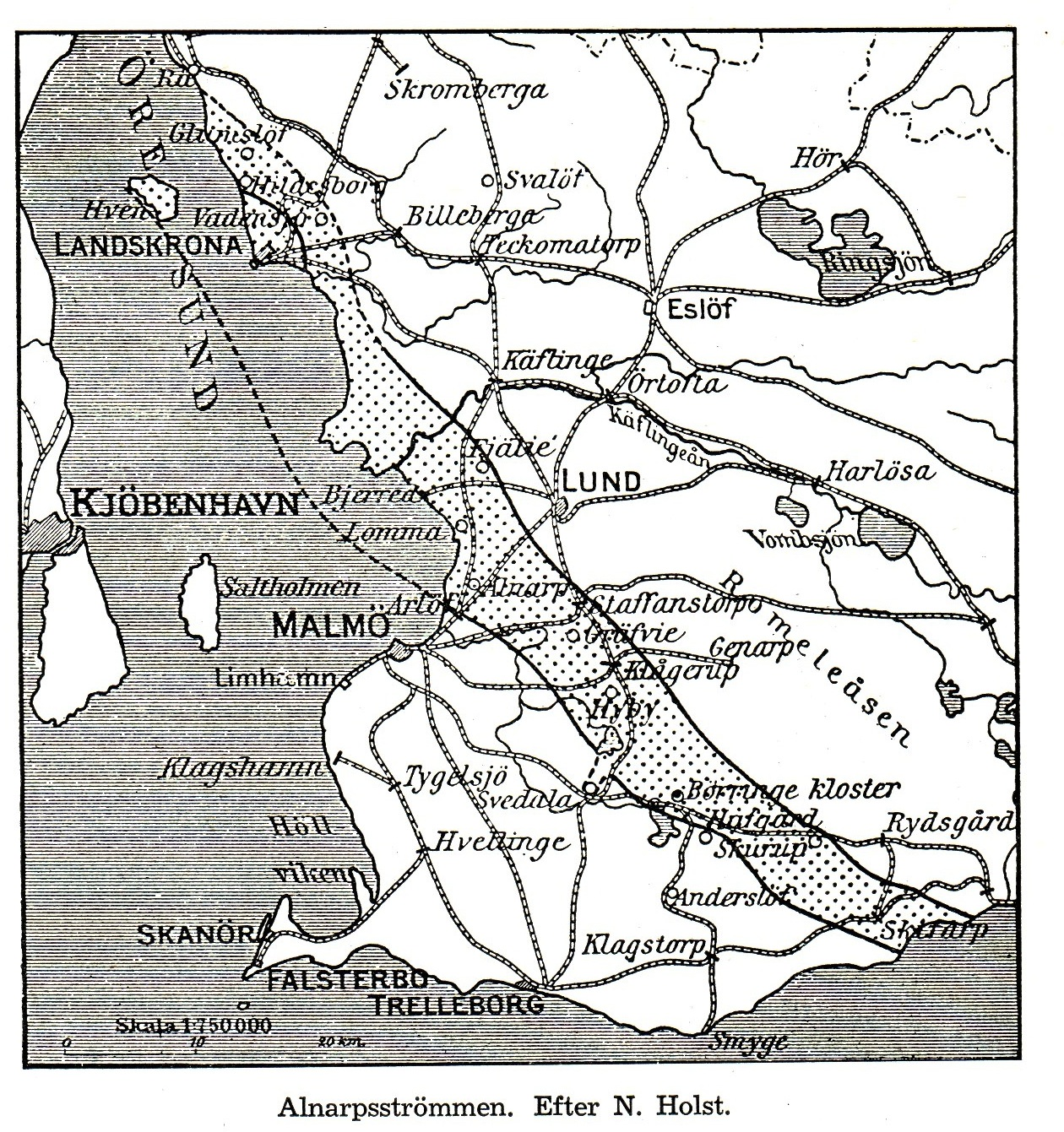
Map of Alnarpsströmmen

Alnarpsströmmen is a subterranean aquifer under the Swedish province of Scania. It has been used for wells since at least the 18th century and as a fresh water source for Malmö since 1901. Several other towns use it today. Due to its artesian character, wells occasionally turn into fountains. About 400 litres of groundwater naturally flow into Öresund from Alnarpsströmmen every second through the quaternary moraine. The width of the aquifer is around 20 km, and the flow of the water is just 10 metres a year.
