= Jandakot Mound =

Aquifer in Perth, Western Australia

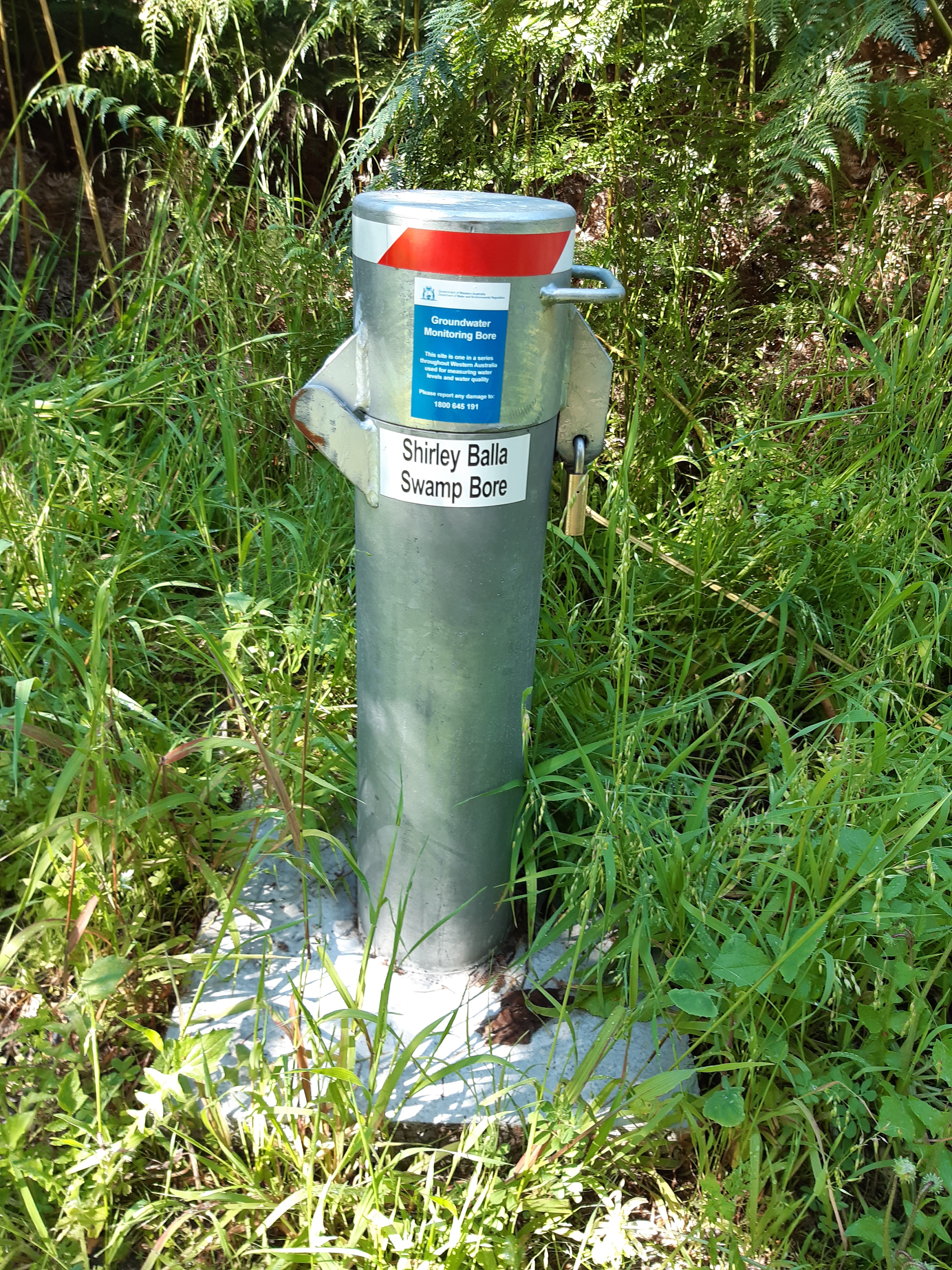
A Groundwater monitoring bore at Shirley Balla Swamp Reserve, Banjup

The Jandakot Mound, or Jandakot Groundwater Mound, is an unconfined aquifer in south-western Western Australia. It is the smaller of the two main shallow aquifers near Perth (the other being the Gnangara Mound, north of the Swan River) that together supply about 40% of Perth's drinking water. Its highest point lies about 18 km (11 mi) south of Perth's central business district. It stretches from the Swan River in the north to the Serpentine River in the south, and from the Indian Ocean in the west to the Darling Scarp and Southern River in the east, covering an area of about 760 km^{2} (290 sq mi).

The Jandakot Mound is a sand aquifer with a saturated thickness of up to 40 m (130 ft). It contains an estimated 4,200 gigalitres (150 billion cubic feet) of fresh water, and the annual recharge can reach 76 gigalitres (2.7 billion cubic feet). It contributes 9 gigalitres (320 million cubic feet) annually to Perth's municipal supply of drinking water and is also heavily used for private supplies. Where it is close to the surface, it supports extensive wetland systems, the most important of which are Beeliar Wetlands, Forrestdale and Thomsons Lakes. It also recharges the deeper confined aquifers in the area, the Leederville and Yarragadee Aquifers.
