= List of rivers of South Carolina =

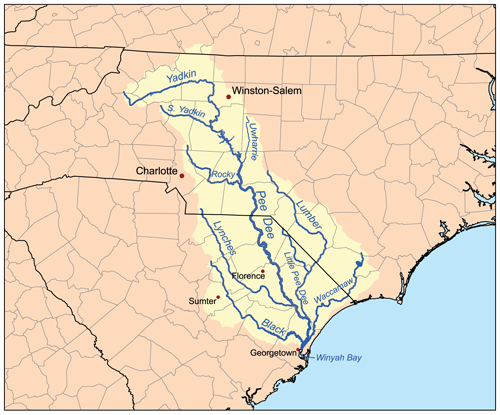
Yadkin–Pee Dee drainage basin

This is a list of rivers in the U.S. state of South Carolina:

== By drainage basin ==
This list is arranged by drainage basin, from north to south, with respective tributaries indented under each larger stream's name. All rivers in South Carolina drain to the Atlantic Ocean.

- Little River
- Pee Dee River
  - Old Dead River
  - Sampit River
  - Black River
    - Black Mingo Creek
    - Pocotaligo River
  - Little Pee Dee River
    - Lumber River
  - Lynches River
    - Little River
  - Jeffries Creek
  - Black Creek

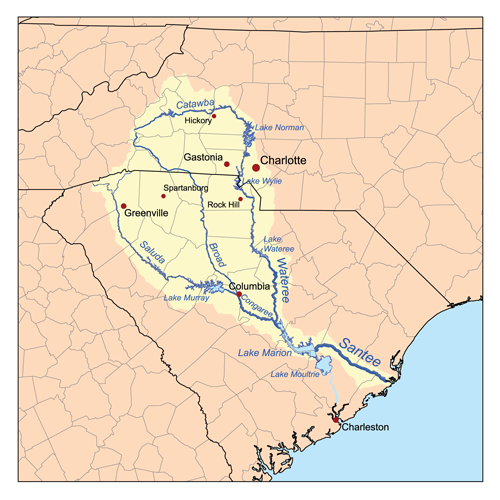
Santee drainage basin

- Santee River (North Santee River and South Santee River are distributaries)
  - Little River
  - Wateree River
    - Catawba River
      - Fishing Creek
  - Congaree River
    - Dead River
    - Old Dead River
    - Broad River
      - Little River
      - Enoree River
      - Tyger River
        - Fairforest Creek
        - North Tyger River
          - Middle Tyger River
        - South Tyger River
      - Sandy River
        - Little Sandy River
      - Pacolet River
        - Lawsons Fork Creek
        - North Pacolet River
        - South Pacolet River
    - Saluda River
      - Little Saluda River
      - Bush River
      - Little River
      - Reedy River
      - North Saluda River
      - Middle Saluda River
      - South Saluda River
        - Oolenoy River
    - Gills Creek

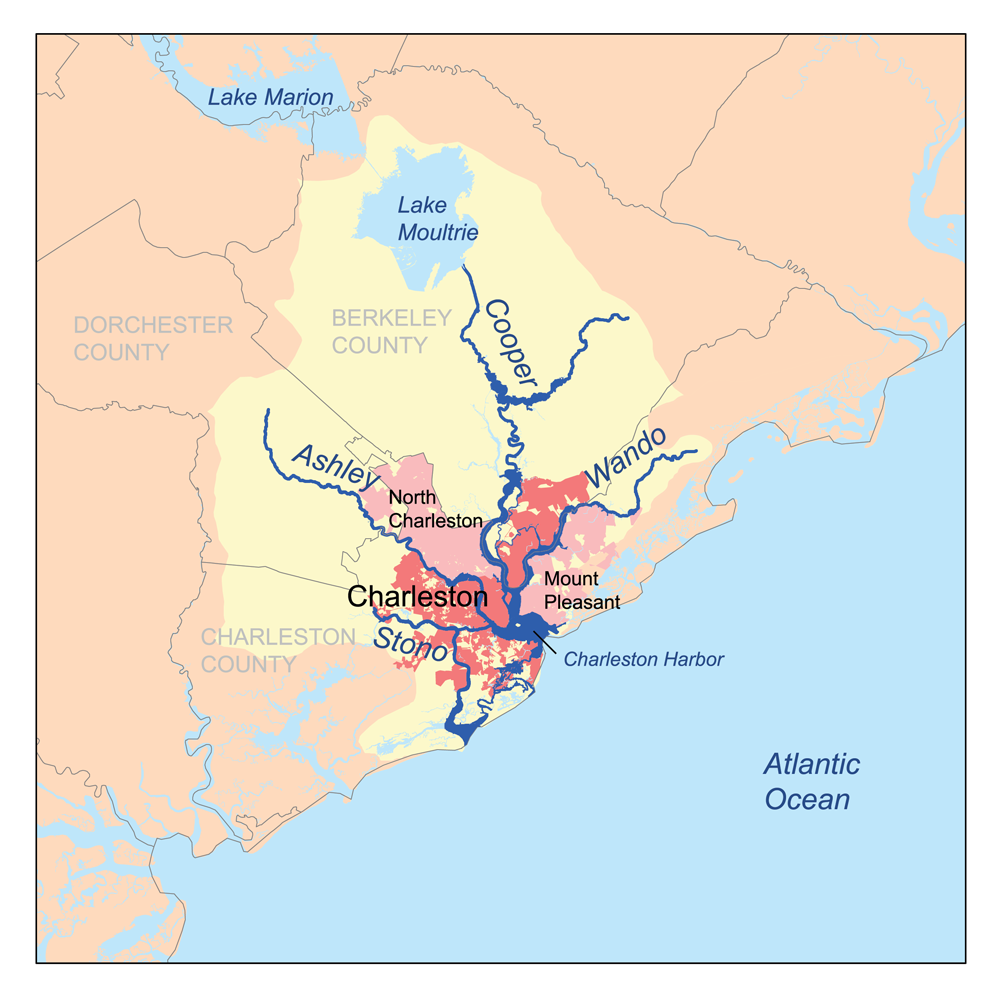
Rivers flowing to Charleston Harbor

- Wando River
- Cooper River
  - Back River
- Ashley River
- Stono River
- Kiawah River

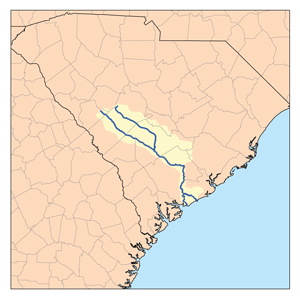
Edisto drainage basin

- Edisto River (North Edisto River and South Edisto River are distributaries)
  - Four Holes Swamp
  - North Fork Edisto River
    - Bull Swamp Creek
  - South Fork Edisto River
    - Little River
- Ashepoo River
- Combahee River
  - Little Salkehatchie River
  - Salkehatchie River
- Coosaw River
- Morgan River (SC)
- Story River
- Beaufort River
- Broad River
  - Colleton River
  - Pocotaligo River
  - Coosawhatchie River
    - Tulifiny River
- May River
- New River
- Wright River

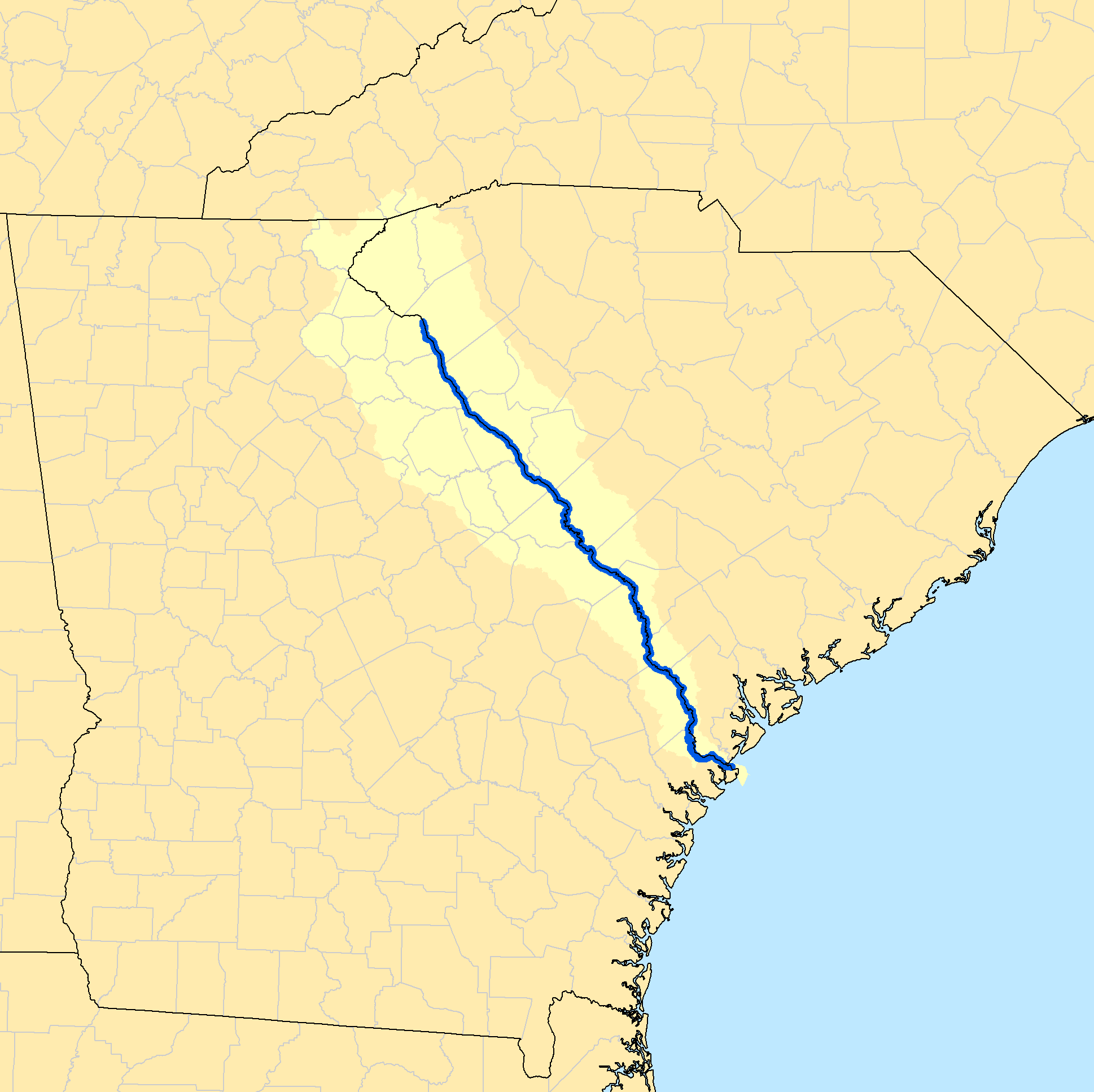
Savannah drainage basin

- Savannah River
  - Stevens Creek
  - Little River
  - Rocky River
  - Seneca River
    - Keowee River
      - Little River
        - Flat Shoals River
      - Toxaway River
        - Horsepasture River
      - Whitewater River
        - Thompson River
  - Tugaloo River
    - Chauga River
    - Chattooga River
      - East Fork Chattooga River

== Alphabetically ==
- Ashepoo River
- Ashley River
- Back River
- Bates Old River
- Beaufort River
- Black River
- Black Mingo Creek
- Broad River (northern)
- Broad River (southern)
- Bull Swamp Creek
- Bush River
- Catawba River
- Chattooga River
- Chauga River
- Chechessee River
- Combahee River
- Colleton River
- Congaree River
- Cooper River (incl. East & West Branches, and Back River)
- Coosaw River
- Coosawhatchie River
- Dead River
- East Fork Chatooga River
- Edisto River (incl. North & South Forks)
- Enoree River
- Flat Shoals River
- Four Holes Swamp
- Gills Creek
- Great Pee Dee River
- Grove Creek
- Harbor River
- Horsepasture River
- Keowee River
- Little Lynches River
- Little Pee Dee River
- Little River (Broad River tributary)
- Little River (Edisto River tributary)
- Little River (Horry County, South Carolina)
- Little River (Lynches River tributary)
- Little River (McCormick County, South Carolina)
- Little River (Oconee County, South Carolina)
- Little River (Saluda River tributary)
- Little River (Santee River tributary)
- Little Salkehatchie River
- Little Saluda River
- Little Sandy River
- Lumber River
- Lynches River
- May River
- Morgan River (SC)
- New River
- Oolenoy River
- Okatee River
- Old Dead River (Marlboro County)
- Old Dead River (Richland County, Congaree National Park)
- Pacolet River (incl. North, South, and Lawson's Fork Creek)
- Pocotaligo River (Black River tributary)
- Pocotaligo River (Broad River tributary)
- Reedy River
- Rocky River
- Salkehatchie River
- Saluda River (incl. North, Middle, and South Forks)
- Sampit River
- Sandy River
- Santee River (incl. North & South)
- Savannah River
- Seneca River
- Stevens Creek
- Stono River
- Story River
- Thompson River
- Toxaway River
- Tugaloo River
- Tyger River (incl. North, Middle, and South)
- Waccamaw River
- Wando River
- Wateree River
- Whitewater River
- Wright River

== See also ==
- List of rivers in the United States
- List of lakes in South Carolina
