= Sandy River (South Carolina) =

River in South Carolina, United States

Coordinates: 34.65639°N 81.32694°W

The Sandy River and its tributary the Little Sandy River are short rivers in north-central South Carolina in the United States. The Sandy is a tributary of the Broad River; via the Broad and Congaree Rivers, it is part of the watershed of the Santee River, which flows to the Atlantic Ocean.

The Sandy River flows for nearly its entire length in Chester County. It rises near Lowrys, about 7 mi (11 km) north-northwest of the town of Chester, and flows generally southwestwardly; about 1 mi (2 km) of its lowermost course is used to define the boundary between Chester and Fairfield Counties. It flows into the Broad River from the east on this boundary, in the Sumter National Forest, about 3 mi (5 km) southwest of the town of Carlisle.

The Little Sandy River, also known historically as "Hueys Creek" and "Prices Fork", flows for its entire length in southern Chester County, rising about 5 mi (8 km) south of the town of Chester and flowing westwardly to the Sandy River about 4 mi (7 km) northeast of the Sandy's mouth at the Broad River.

== See also ==
- List of South Carolina rivers
