= Tyger River =

Stream in the U.S. state of South Carolina

Coordinates: 34°29′43″N 81°25′26″W

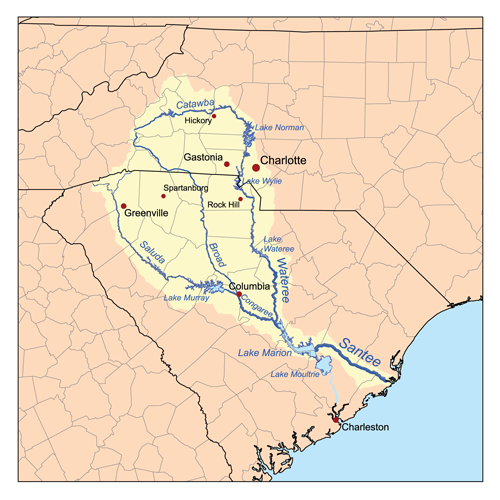
- The Tyger River is part of the Santee River Basin

Location
- Country: United States
- State: South Carolina
- Counties: Spartanburg, Union, Newberry

Physical characteristics
- Source
  - location: Near Woodruff, South Carolina
- Mouth
  - location: Broad River, Near Blythewood, South Carolina
  - coordinates: 34.495038, -81.423987
- Basin size: 807.9 mi^{2}
- Width
  - average: 50 ft
- Depth
  - average: 3 ft
- Discharge
  - location: Broad River, Near Blythewood, South Carolina

Basin features
- River system: Santee
- Tributaries
  - left: Jimmies Creek
  - right: Tinker Creek, Fairforest Creek, Dutchman Creek

The Tyger River is a stream in the U.S. state of South Carolina, and a tributary of the Broad River. It is part of the Santee River Basin. It is a generally shallow and narrow river. Pollution in the north fork was the source of dispute in Friends of the Earth, Inc. v. Laidlaw Environmental Services, Inc.

== Etymology ==
There are several theories to how the river got its name. A local legend says the river got its name for its "tiger-like" current. Another legend states that it was named after a French explorer named Tygert. One legend states that a wild cat and bear fought on the riverbank, with the wild cat winning. The Cherokee called the river Amoyescheck.

According to the Geographic Names Information System, variant names for the river include A Moyes Chek, Tiger River, and Tygar River.

== Course ==
The Tyger River starts as three forks in Spartanburg County, in upstate South Carolina, the north, middle, and south Tyger Rivers. The rivers flow generally southeastward until joining near Woodruff. The river continues flowing southeast until becoming the border for Union and Newberry Counties, while flowing 26 miles through Sumter National Forest. The river continues until joining the Broad River north of the Parr Reservoir. This point is the tri-point between Newberry, Union, and Fairfield Counties.

Via the Broad River, the Tyger River is part of the Santee River Basin.

== Crossings ==
=== Spartanburg County ===
SC 14 - Crosses South River

SC 357 - Crosses South and Middle forks

SC 290 (E Poinsett Street Extension) - Crosses South Fork

I-85 - Crosses all 3 forks

SC 296 (Reidville Road)

SC 417

US 221 - Crosses North and South Forks

I-26

SC 56

=== Union County ===
SC 49 (Cross Keys Hwy)

US 176 (Whitmire Hwy)

SC 72 (Carsile Whitmire Hwy)

== See also ==
- List of rivers of South Carolina
