= Columbia Canal =

- U.S. National Register of Historic Places
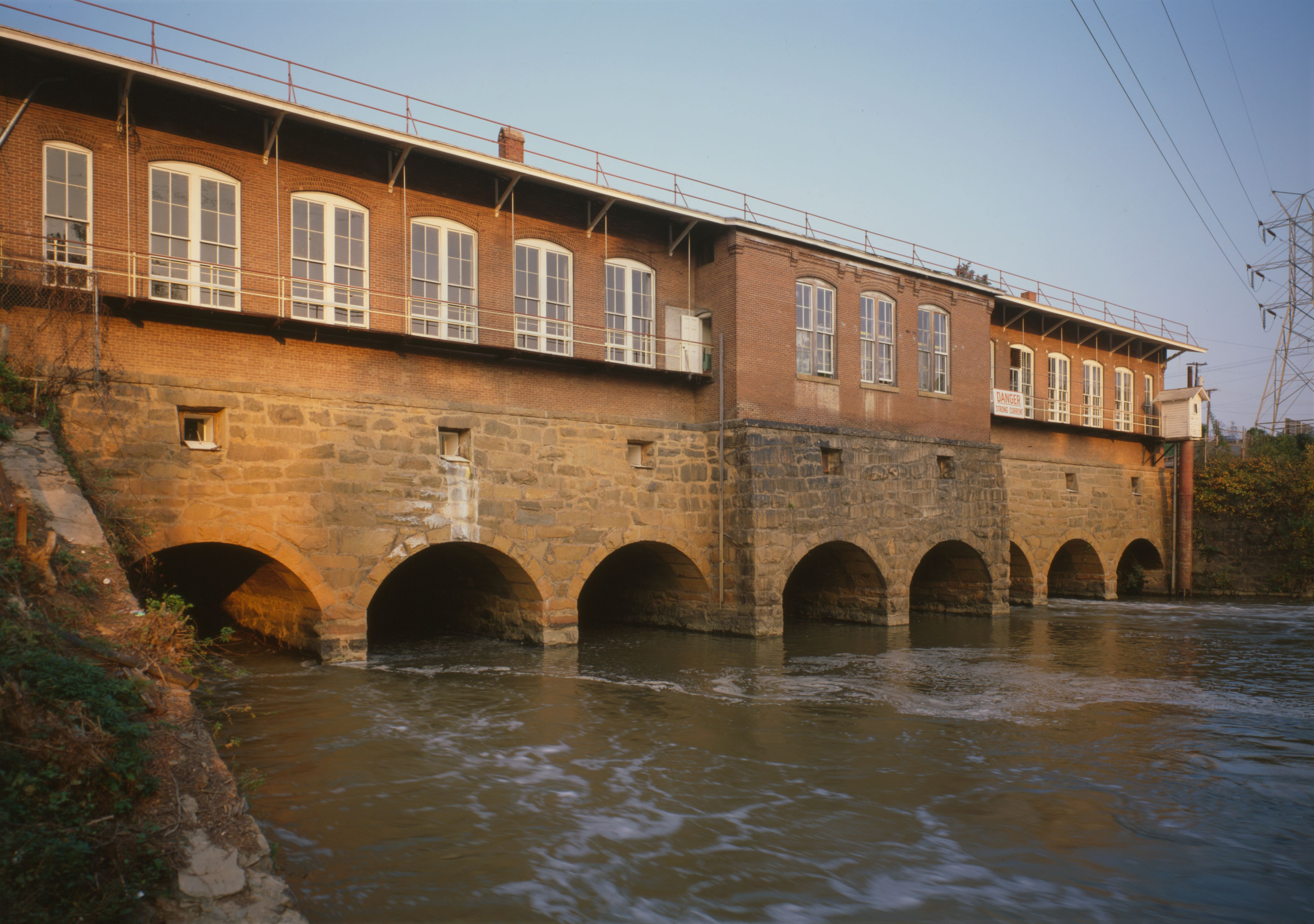
- Columbia Canal Power Plant and Canal Races
- Location: E bank of the Broad and Congaree Rivers from the Diversion dam to the Southern RR Bridge; Richland County, South Carolina
- Nearest city: Columbia, South Carolina
- Coordinates: 34°01′15″N 81°03′43″W
- Built: 1824 & 1893
- NRHP reference No.: 79002392
- Added to NRHP: 15 January 1979

The Columbia Canal is the surviving canal of a series of canals built by the State of South Carolina in 1824 using the labor of indentured Irishmen to provide direct water routes between the upstate settlements and the towns on the Fall Line. It is on the Congaree and Broad rivers in Columbia, South Carolina. It is the focal point of the Riverfront Park in Columbia. The canal is now used to generate hydroelectric power by the South Carolina Electric & Gas Co.

The Columbia Canal is on the National Register of Historic Places, No. 79002392. The South Carolina Department of Archives and History has additional pictures and information, and copies of the nomination forms.

There are additional pictures, and information available from the Historic American Engineering Record at the Library of Congress.

== History ==
=== 1824 Canal ===
In 1820, construction started on a canal to navigate the rapids where the Broad River and the Saluda River form the Congaree River. It used a natural ravine that was between the City of Columbia and the Congaree and Broad Rivers. The canal started between Lumber (currently Calhoun) and Richland Streets. It ran along the Congaree for about 3.1 mi (5 km). It ended across from Granby Landing just north of the current railroad bridges across the Congaree. The canal was completed in 1824. It was 12 ft (3.7 m) wide and 2.5 ft (0.8 m) deep north of Senate St. South of Senate St., the canal was 18 ft (5.5 m) wide and 4 ft (1.2 m) deep. It had an 8 ft (2.4 m) wide towpath on either side. The canal had four lifting locks and one guard lock for the 34 ft (10 m) descent of the river. A diversion dam was built across the Broad River to allow access from the Saluda Canal. There were three waste weirs to prevent flooding of the canal.

A separate canal, which was called Bull Sluice, was constructed north of Columbia Canal on the Broad River, This ½ mi (0.8 km) long canal had one lock. The 1891 canal extended the Columbia Canal upstream of Bull Sluice.

In 1840, the State of South Carolina dropped its subsidy of the canal. In 1842, the railroads came to Columbia and the traffic on the canal decreased. During the Civil War, the hydraulic power of the canal was used to make gunpowder. Mills that used the canal for power were a grist mill run by the State Penitentiary, another grist mill, and a saw mill.

Portions of the 1824 canal south of Gervais St. survive today. Also parts of the Bull Sluice canal remain.

=== 1891 Canal ===
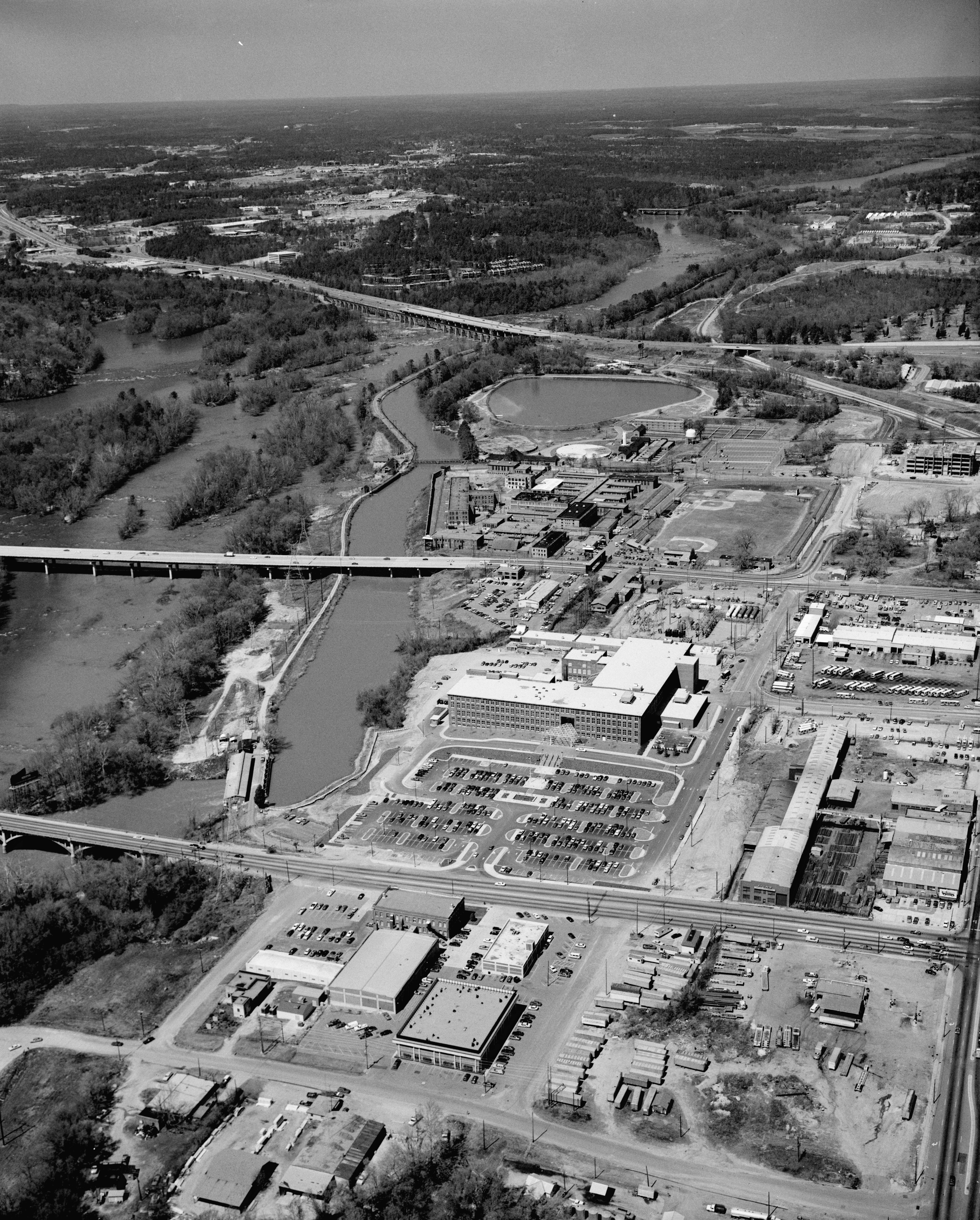

In 1888, the canal was redesigned as an industrial power source. The revised design started at Gervais St. and extended about 3½ mi(5.6 km) north along the Congaree and Broad Rivers. It was about 150 ft (46 m) wide and 10 ft (3 m) deep. It included a new diversion dam, an entry lock, and a waste weir. It was opened in 1891.

The Columbia Mill, now known as the South Carolina State Museum, was built on high ground north of Gervais Street. To power the alternating current motors in the mills, a powerhouse was built on the canal about 600 ft (183 m) away. This made it the first textile mill in the world to use AC motors and generate power away from the mill.

The Columbia Hydro plant was built at the southern end of the canal. This produced power for industry, the City of Columbia, and the street railway system. It was once operated by the South Carolina Electric & Gas Co.

=== 2008 ===
In September 2008, the St Columbia division of the Ancient Order of Hibernians dedicated a memorial to the Irish canal workers that built the Columbia Canal. Known as the South Carolina Irish Memorial, this granite memorial pays tribute to the Irish workers that built and also died digging this canal, many that are buried at the nearby St. Peter's Catholic Church.

=== 2015 ===
As a result of catastrophic flooding in early October, the canal was breached. Shortly after, the South Carolina Army National Guard made a claim that repair was underway. In 2021 the funding for repairs, coming from the Dept. of Housing and Urban Development, was approved and repairs have been estimated to be completed by 2023. As of February 2024, repairs on the canal have yet to begin. They still remain in the planning stage.

== See also ==
- List of canals in the United States
