= Reedy River =

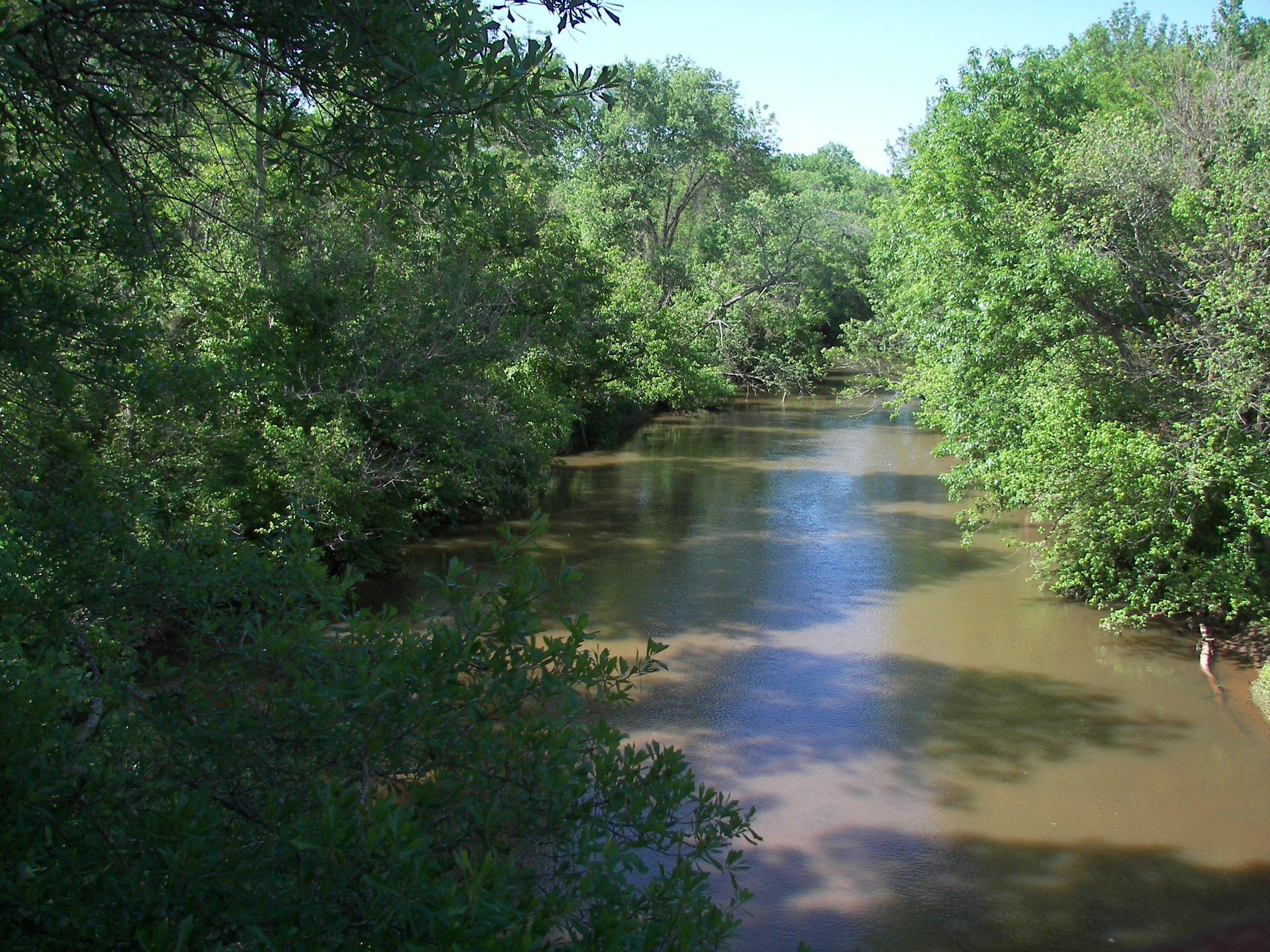
- The Reedy River in Lake Conestee Nature Park

Physical characteristics
- Source
  - location: Greenville County, South Carolina
  - coordinates: 34.98956°N 82.47151°W
- Mouth
  - location: Saluda River
  - coordinates: 34.30401°N 82.08928°W
- Length: 65 mi (105 km)

The Reedy River is a tributary of the Saluda River, about 65 miles (105 km) long, in northwestern South Carolina in the United States. Via the Saluda and Congaree rivers, it is part of the watershed of the Santee River, which flows to the Atlantic Ocean.

== The Reedy River Falls: Big Brother ==
Big Brother, or "The Falls", is a large waterfall that flows through Falls Park in Greenville, South Carolina. It is overseen by the Liberty Bridge. Sliding down the falls is illegal according to Greenville law, but it is still practiced by many kayakers and other adventure seekers.

== Course ==
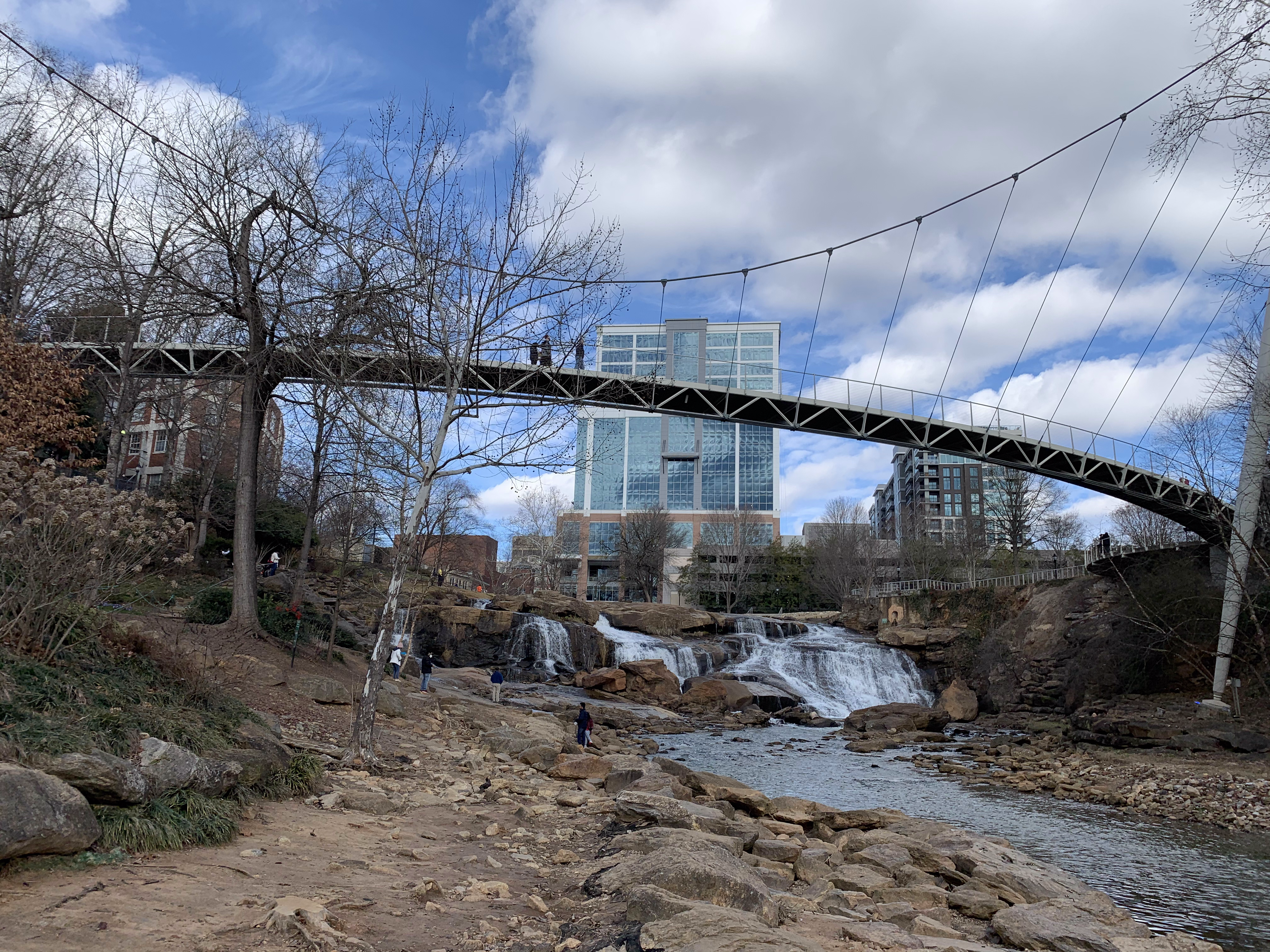
The Reedy River Falls with the Liberty Bridge in the foreground.

The Reedy River rises in Greenville County in the foothills of the Blue Ridge Mountains, about 10 miles (16 km) northwest of the city of Greenville, and flows generally south-southeastwardly through Greenville, Lake Conestee Nature Park, and the Piedmont region into Laurens County. It joins the Saluda River in Laurens County, 9 miles (14 km) northeast of Greenwood, as part of Lake Greenwood, which is formed by a dam on the Saluda.

== Pollution ==
The pollution in the river was identified to be unfit for humans because of E. coli. Children were commonly seen sliding down rocks in a section of the river in Falls Park and the practice is now discouraged by signage and mild policing. Though it's not necessarily unsafe to wade in the waters, it's under studied.

There are ongoing efforts to improve water quality along the whole of the Reedy River by the city, volunteers, and private companies. Educating on clean water practices (e.g. Cleaning up after pets in the park) and Enacting programs such as 319 grant that offer grants to people with septic malfunctions instead of letting the issue go without maintenance, polluting ground water.

== Crossings ==
The following is a list of crossings of the Reedy River from Greenville downstream starting in downtown Greenville at US 123. This list may at times be incomplete.

- City of Greenville
  - US 123/S Academy Street
  - River Street bridge
  - Pedestrian bridge at the Peace Center, converted from a former railroad bridge
  - Main Street bridge at Camperdown
  - Liberty Bridge
  - US 29/S Church Street
  - McDaniel Avenue
  - Woodland Way in Cleveland Park
  - E Faris Road
  - Cleveland Street
  - S Pleasantburg Drive, SC 291
  - Interstate 85
- Greenville County
  - Mauldin Road
  - Conestee Road
  - Ashmore Bridge Road
  - Interstate 185
  - Log Shoals Road
  - W Georgia Road
  - New Harrison Bridge Road
  - Jenkins Bridge Road and SC 418
  - McKelvey Road in Fork Shoals
  - McKittrick Bridge Road
  - Hillside Church Road
  - Dunklin Bridge Road
- Laurens County
  - US 76 in Hickory Tavern
  - SC 252
  - Ekom Beach Road
  - Indian Mound Road
  - Riverfork Road over Lake Greenwood

== See also ==
- List of South Carolina rivers

== Sources ==
- Columbia Gazetteer of North America entry
- DeLorme (1998). South Carolina Atlas & Gazetteer. Yarmouth, Maine: DeLorme. ISBN 0-89933-237-4.
- U.S. Geological Survey Geographic Names Information System: Reedy River
- American Whitewater
