= Bush River (South Carolina) =

Coordinates: 34.119182°N 81.598306°W

The Bush River is a tributary of the Saluda River, 30 mi (48 km) long, in the Piedmont region of western South Carolina in the United States. Via the Saluda and Congaree Rivers, it is part of the watershed of the Santee River, which flows to the Atlantic Ocean.

According to the Geographic Names Information System, it has also been known as "Bush Creek." The United States Board on Geographic Names settled on "Bush River" as the stream's name in 1973.

== Course ==
The Bush River rises in Laurens County, just south of the town of Clinton, and flows generally southeastwardly into Newberry County, past Joanna. It joins into the Saluda River about 11 mi (17 km) south of Newberry as part of Lake Murray, which is formed on the Saluda by Saluda Dam.

== See also ==
- List of South Carolina rivers

== Sources ==
- DeLorme (1998). South Carolina Atlas & Gazetteer. Yarmouth, Maine: DeLorme. ISBN 0-89933-237-4.
- U.S. Geological Survey Geographic Names Information System: Bush River
