= Broad River (Carolinas) =

River in North and South Carolina, United States

Coordinates: 34.007356°N 81.059137°W

Broad River Rocky Broad River
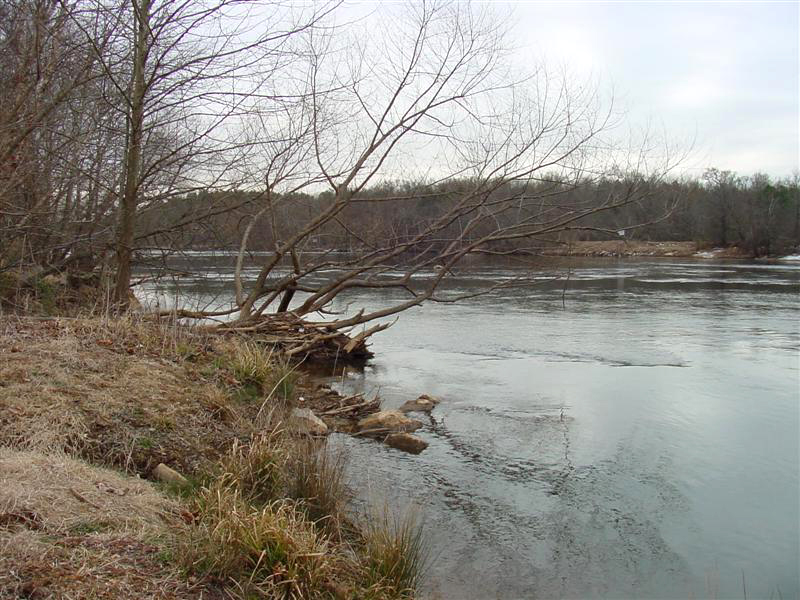
- The Broad River near Blacksburg, South Carolina

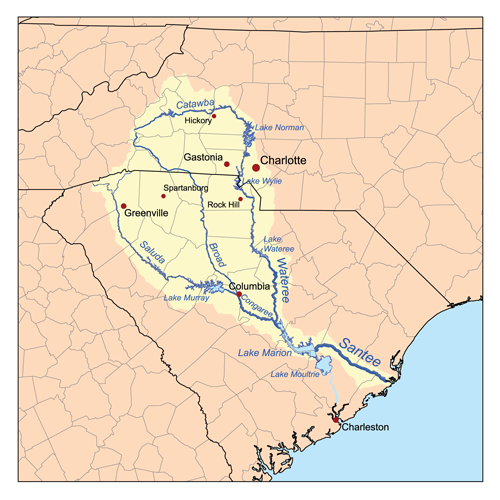
- Map of the Santee River watershed showing the Broad River.

Location
- Country: United States
- State: North Carolina, South Carolina

Physical characteristics
- Source
  - location: Black Mountain, Buncombe County, North Carolina
  - elevation: 2,890 ft (880 m)
- Mouth: Congaree River
  - location: Columbia, Richland County, South Carolina
  - elevation: 128 ft (39 m)
- Length: 150 mi (240 km)
- Discharge
  - location: Congaree River, Columbia, South Carolina

Basin features
- Progression: Broad → Congaree → Santee → Atlantic Ocean
- River system: Broad River
- Tributaries
  - left: Little River, Green River
  - right: Pacolet River, Enoree River

The Broad River is a principal tributary of the Congaree River, about 150 miles (240 km) long, in western North Carolina and northern South Carolina in the United States. Via the Congaree, it is part of the watershed of the Santee River, which flows to the Atlantic Ocean. It is called the Rocky Broad River in the Hickorynut Gorge in North Carolina near the communities of Bat Cave and Chimney Rock.

== Course ==
The Broad River originates in the Blue Ridge Mountains of eastern Buncombe County, North Carolina and flows generally south-southeastwardly, through or along the boundaries of Rutherford, Polk and Cleveland Counties in North Carolina; and Cherokee, York, Union, Chester, Fairfield, Newberry and Richland Counties in South Carolina. In North Carolina, the river is dammed to form Lake Lure; in South Carolina it passes through the Sumter National Forest and the communities of Cherokee Falls and Lockhart before joining the Saluda River to form the Congaree River in the city of Columbia.

Principal tributaries of the Broad River include the Green, Second Broad and First Broad Rivers in North Carolina; and the Bowens, Pacolet, Sandy, Tyger, Enoree and Little Rivers in South Carolina.

== Dams ==
This is an incomplete list of dams starting at Lake Lure and moving downstream

North Carolina

- Lake Lure
- Cliffside Steam Station (Duke Energy) on the Border of Rutherford and Cleveland Counties.

South Carolina

- Gaston Shoals Dam (Gaffney)
- Cherokee Falls
- Ninety Nine Islands Dam adjacent to the abandoned Cherokee Nuclear Power Plant
- Dam and canal at Lockhart
- Neal Shoals Dam
- Parr Shoals Dam forming Parr Reservoir
- Columbia Canal and Dam in Columbia

== Crossings ==
The Broad River is crossed several times by many highways (Note: this list at times may be incomplete)

North Carolina

- Rutherford County
  - US 64 / US 74 Alt. (Local traffic only as of 4 August 2026)
  - NC 108 (Tryon Road)
  - Grays Road
  - Union Road
  - US 74
  - Poors Ford Road
  - Big Island Road
  - Jack McKinney Road
  - US 221
  - US 221 Alt.
- Cleveland County
  - NC 150 (Gaffney Road)

South Carolina

- Gaffney/Cherokee County
  - SC 18 (Shelby Highway)
  - I-85
  - US 29 (Cherokee Avenue)
  - SC 211 (Hickory Grove Road)
- Chester and Union Counties
  - SC 9 / SC 49 (Pinkney Road) in Lockhart
  - SC 72 / SC 215 in Carlisle
- Fairfield and Newberry Counties
  - SC 34 (Newberry Road)
  - SC 213 (Parr Road) in Peak
- Columbia
  - I-20
  - US 176 (Broad River Road)
  - I-126

== Variant names ==
According to the Geographic Names Information System, the Broad River has also been known as

- Eswa Huppeday
- Eswawpuddenah
- Line River
- Main Broad River
- Eswan Happedaw

It was also known in colonial times as the English Broad River to distinguish it from the French Broad River which also originates in western North Carolina, but flows northwest.

The present name is descriptive of the river's width.

The portion of the river upstream of Lake Lure, near Chimney Rock, is commonly known as the Rocky Broad River by locals. In 2024, the river experienced severe flooding during Hurricane Helene, which caused major damage to surrounding communities.

== See also ==
- French Broad River
- List of North Carolina rivers
- List of South Carolina rivers
