= Liberty Bridge at Falls Park on the Reedy =

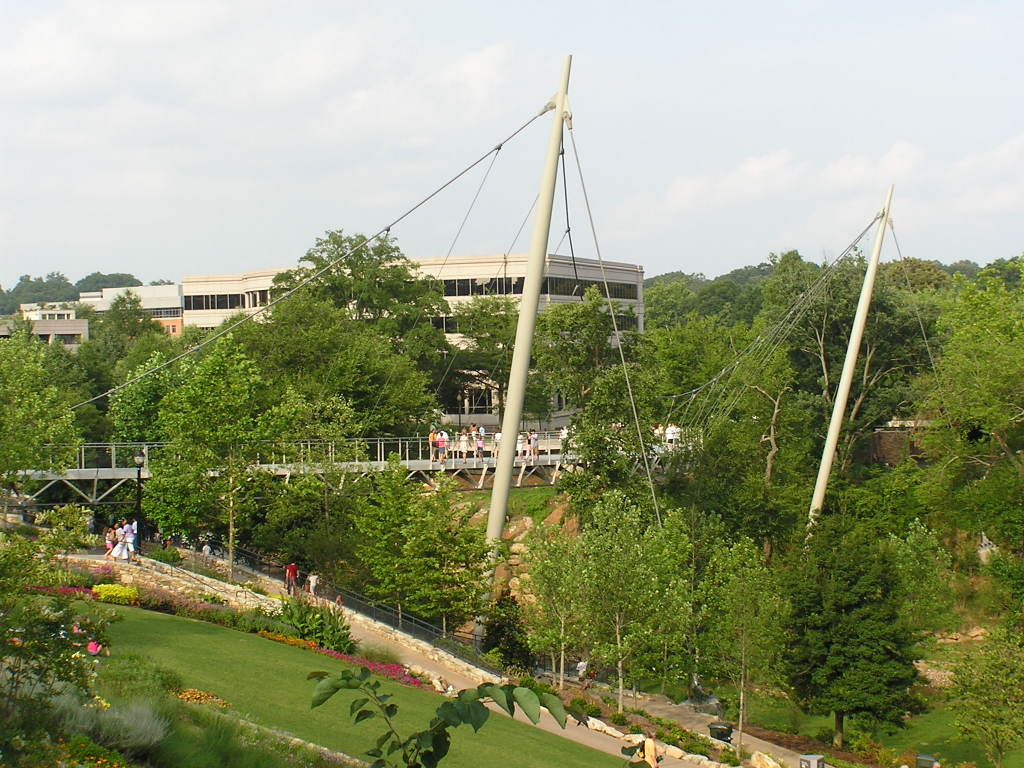
- The Liberty Bridge
- Coordinates: 34°50′40.3″N 82°24′4.7″W
- Carries: Pedestrians
- Crosses: Reedy River
- Locale: Greenville, South Carolina

Characteristics
- Design: Single suspension with 2 inclined towers
- Total length: 345 ft (105 m)
- Width: 12 ft (3.7 m)
- Longest span: 200 ft (61 m)

History
- Construction start: 2003
- Construction end: 2004
- Opened: September 10, 2004

Location
- Interactive map of Liberty Bridge at Falls Park on the Reedy

The Liberty Bridge is a pedestrian bridge in Greenville, South Carolina. It is located at Falls Park on the Reedy, where it crosses the Reedy River above the Reedy River Falls.

== Description ==
Downtown Greenville is bisected by a wooded valley park containing the falls of the Reedy River. The Liberty Bridge is located just downstream from this group of waterfalls, replacing a six-lane highway bridge that was demolished to improve the visibility and accessibility to the falls and adjacent park. The bridge has a curved clear span over the river that curves away from the falls, providing visitors with an aerial amphitheater from which to view the cascading water. The link gently slopes into the ravine and is supported by twin inclined towers and a single suspension cable with thin cable suspenders only on the side away from the falls, allowing for unobstructed views. The bridge, with a total length of approximately 345 ft (105 m) and a clear span of 200 ft (61 m), appears to float over the landscape. The twin towers and suspension cable are visible from vantage points around the city, calling attention and drawing visitors to the public park, falls and river.

== Design and construction ==
Prior to the construction of the bridge, the Reedy River was the original site of the four-lane Camperdown Bridge. The original bridge was criticized for not only blocking the view of the Reedy River, but for also attracting criminals. The Camperdown Bridge was demolished in July 2002 as part of the city's redesign. Originally named the Reedy Falls Bridge, the bridge was redesigned after construction plans went overbudget by $1.8 million. On September 11, 2003, it was announced that the Reedy Falls bridge would be renamed to Liberty Bridge, after Liberty Corporation donated $3 million to the project.

The Liberty Bridge was completed in 2004, with Miguel Rosales of Boston-based transportation architects Rosales + Partners providing conceptual, preliminary, and final designs, construction services, and community participation to the City of Greenville. Rosales + Partners collaborated with structural engineers Schlaich Bergermann & Partner and Arbor Engineering. The bridge was officially opened on September 10, 2004.

In October 2014, about a decade after the bridge's opening, mayor Knox H. White said that "Greenville never had an iconic image" before the bridge's construction, adding "the bridge became that".
