= Chatuga River =

Chatuga River is a variant spelling for three rivers in the United States:

- Chattooga River, forming the boundary between Georgia and South Carolina
- Chattooga River (Alabama-Georgia), in Chattooga County, Georgia, flowing into Alabama
- Chauga River in South Carolina
