= Friends of the Earth, Inc. v. Laidlaw Environmental Services, Inc. =

Friends of the Earth, Inc., et al. v. Laidlaw Environmental Services, Inc.
- Supreme Court of the United States

Argued October 12, 1999 Decided January 12, 2000
- Full case name: Friends of the Earth, Incorporated, et al. v. Laidlaw Environmental Services (TOC), Incorporated
- Citations: 528 U.S. 167 (more) 120 S. Ct. 693; 145 L. Ed. 2d 610; 2000 U.S. LEXIS 501; 49 ERC (BNA) 1769; 163 A.L.R. Fed. 749; 2000 Cal. Daily Op. Service 289; 2000 Daily Journal DAR 375; 30 ELR 20246; 1999 Colo. J. C.A.R. 142; 13 Fla. L. Weekly Fed. S 37

Case history
- Prior: 956 F. Supp. 588 (D.S.C. 1997); vacated and remanded, 149 F.3d 303 (4th Cir. 1998); cert. granted, 525 U.S. 1176 (1999).

Holding
- Plaintiff residents in the area of North Tyger River had standing to sue an industrial polluter against whom various deterrent civil penalties were being pursued.

Court membership
- Chief Justice William Rehnquist Associate Justices John P. Stevens · Sandra Day O'Connor; Antonin Scalia · Anthony Kennedy; David Souter · Clarence Thomas; Ruth Bader Ginsburg · Stephen Breyer

Case opinions
- Majority: Ginsburg, joined by Rehnquist, Stevens, O'Connor, Kennedy, Souter, Breyer
- Concurrence: Stevens
- Concurrence: Kennedy
- Dissent: Scalia, joined by Thomas

Laws applied
- U.S. Const. Art. III

Friends of the Earth, Inc. v. Laidlaw Environmental Services, Inc., 528 U.S. 167 (2000), was a United States Supreme Court case that addressed the law regarding standing to sue and mootness.

The Court held that the plaintiff residents in the area of South Carolina's North Tyger River had standing to sue an industrial polluter, against whom various deterrent civil penalties were being pursued. Standing was properly based on the fact that the residents alleged that they would have used the river for recreational purposes, but could not because of the pollution.

The defendant polluter also claimed that the case was moot because it had ceased polluting, and had closed the factory responsible for the pollution complained of. The Court noted that the polluter still retained its license to operate such a factory, and could reopen similar operations elsewhere if not deterred by the fine sought. Therefore, the case was held not to be moot.

The Supreme Court's majority in Friends ruled that plaintiffs did not need to prove an actual (particular) harm to residents. Writing for the majority, Ruth Bader Ginsburg held that injury to the plaintiff came from lessening the "aesthetic and recreational values of the area" for residents and users of the river because of their knowledge of Laidlaw's repeated violations of its clean water permit.

In addition, the case held that a civil penalty could be enforced against an entity even though the interests protected were private. The court agreed with Congress in holding that civil penalties in the Clean Water Act cases "do more than promote immediate compliance by limiting the defendant's economic incentive to delay its attainment of permit limits; they also deter future violations."

The 7–2 decision was written by Justice Ginsburg, and joined by Justices Rehnquist, Stevens, O'Connor, Kennedy, Souter, and Breyer. Stevens and Kennedy each filed a concurring opinion. Justice Scalia wrote a dissenting opinion, which was joined by Justice Thomas.

== See also ==
- Friends of the Earth (US)
