= Lake Greenwood =

Lake Greenwood may refer to:

- Lake Greenwood (South Carolina), a lake in the U.S. state of South Carolina
- Greenwood Lake, a lake between the U.S. states of New Jersey and New York
