= Crab Creek (Little River tributary) =

Stream in North and South Carolina, U.S.

Coordinates: 35°14′28″N 82°38′09″W

Crab Creek is a stream in the U.S. states of North Carolina and South Carolina. It is a tributary of the Little River.

Crab Creek derives its name from the crabapple trees lining its course.

== See also ==
- List of rivers of North Carolina
- List of rivers of South Carolina
