= South Carolina State Museum =

- Columbia Mills Building
- U.S. National Register of Historic Places
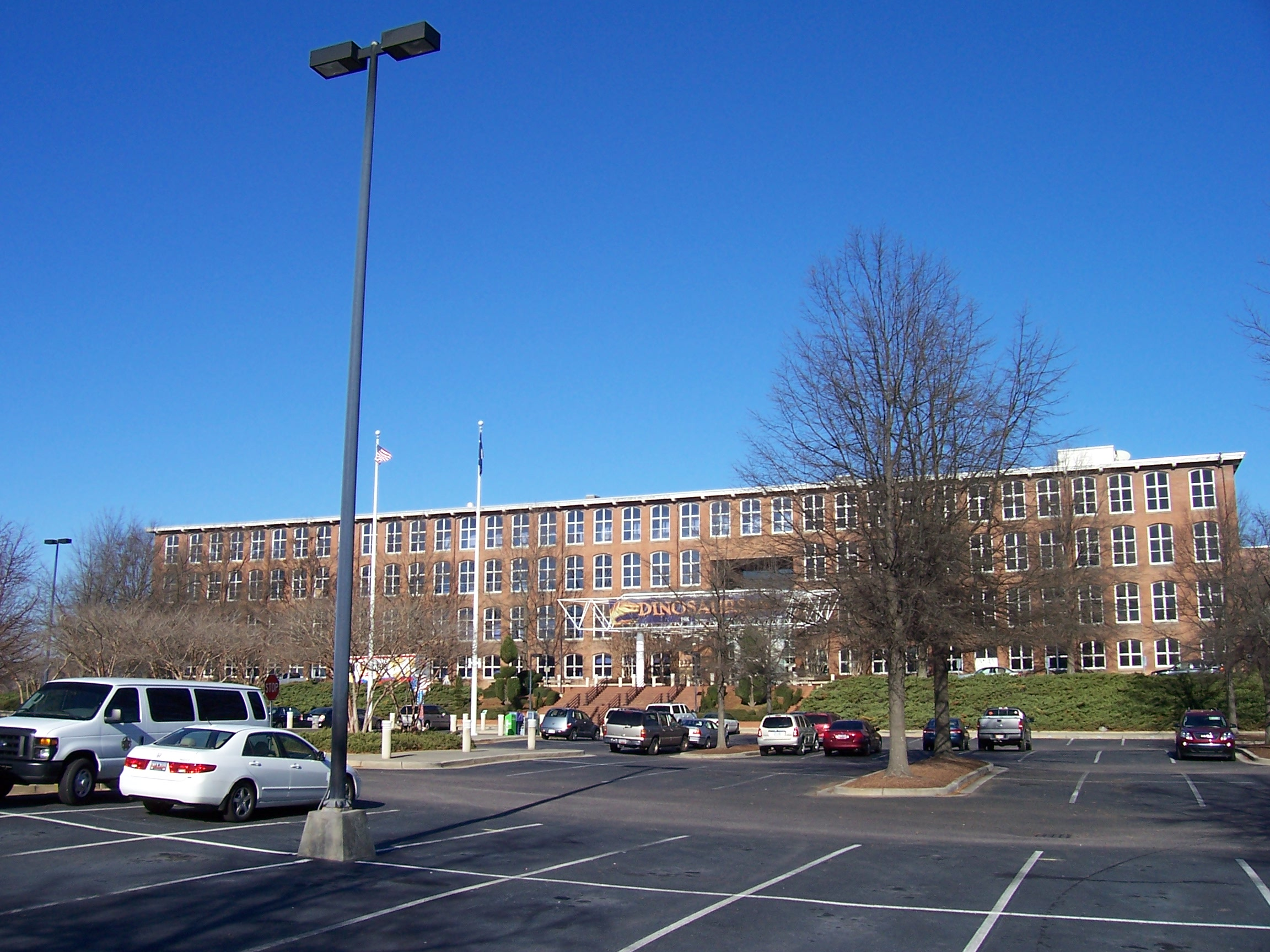
- The former Columbia Mills Building, now the South Carolina State Museum

- Location within South Carolina Location within the United States
- Location: 301 Gervais St, Columbia, South Carolina
- Coordinates: 33°59′55″N 81°2′53″W
- Built: 1894 (126 years ago)
- Architect: Lockwood, Greene, & Co.; Chapman, William A., Co.
- MPS: Columbia MRA
- NRHP reference No.: 82003902
- Added to NRHP: May 24, 1982

The South Carolina State Museum is a museum dedicated to the history of South Carolina. It has four floors of permanent and changing exhibits, a digital dome planetarium, 4D interactive theater, and an observatory (all opened in 2014). The State Museum is located along the banks of the Congaree River in downtown Columbia, South Carolina. It is the largest museum in the state, and is a Smithsonian Affiliate and part of the American Alliance of Museums. Positioned on an old shipping canal (Columbia Canal) that dates back to pre-Civil War times, the museum is widely recognized as a resource for South Carolina history and lifestyle.

== History ==
The museum opened on October 29, 1988, and is housed in what it calls its largest artifact: the former Columbia Mills Building, listed on the National Register of Historic Places in 1982. When the mill opened in 1894, manufacturing cotton duck cloth (a canvas-like material), it was the first completely electric textile mill in the world. It was also the first major industrial installation for the General Electric corporation. On certain levels of the museum, the original flooring has been kept intact, distinguishable by the textile brads and rings (that carried the threads during the spinning process) that became embedded in the floor while it was still being used as a mill. The South Carolina Confederate Relic Room & Military Museum is located within the Columbia Mills Building and is the oldest museum exhibit (est. 1896) in Columbia.

== Collections ==
The museum represents four distinct sections of South Carolina history: art, cultural history, science and technology, and natural history. Exhibits include life-size replicas of the Best Friend of Charleston- the first American-built locomotive in 1830, and the Civil War's H.L. Hunley, the first submarine to sink an enemy ship in combat.

The second floor on natural history is notable for its recreation of a 3.6-million-year-old megalodon, named Finn, suspended mid-air just around a corner, and for a life-size Columbian mammoth (which was once native to SC). The Museum's first natural history curator was Rudy Mancke, who went on to produce a national program on South Carolina Educational Television called NatureScene.

There is also the Lipscomb art gallery on the first floor, which features an iron gate made by Charleston's Philip Simmons. The Cotton Mill Exchange gift shop sells South Carolina souvenirs and books and is located on the first floor. The museum restaurant, the Crescent Café, sells sandwiches and drinks. The museum has a 1989 mural of the nearby Gervais Street Bridge by Columbia's Blue Sky (artist) in a room next to the Café. It has topiary sculpted by Bishopville's Pearl Fryar in the parking lot. The Stringer Discovery Center for small children opened in 1997.

The Lipscomb Gallery re-opened in September 2025, after a two year closure. Over 100 new items from the museum's collections are now on display.

In early 2026, 'Big Percy' a sweetgrass basket weighing 80 pounds and 5-foot-tall by 6-foot-wide was placed on display in the Museum. The sweetgrass basket was created by Corey Alston, a fifth-generation basketmaker.

== Traveling Exhibitions ==
Traveling exhibitions at the State Museum have included "Spanish Explorations in the Caribbean and the US, 1492-1570" (for the 500th anniversary of Columbus' discovery) in 1990, WWII and SC in 1991 (for 50 years since the Pearl Harbor attack), "Rock, Roll, and Remember: Hootie & the Blowfish and Other SC Greats" in 1997, The World of Insects in 1998, Star Trek: The Exhibition in 1999, The Magic School Bus in 1999, Inside Africa in 2004, Prehistoric Predators in 2004, Napoleon Bonaparte in 2006, Aliens: Worlds of Possibilities in 2007, Leonardo da Vinci in 2008, a 2008 exhibit on several of the movies (like The Patriot and Forrest Gump) filmed in SC ("Hollywood Comes to South Carolina"), "Football in the Palmetto State, 1889-2000" in 2008, Pirates in 2010, 150 years of the Civil War in SC in 2011, Body Worlds Vital in 2012, Titanic: the Artifact Exhibition (100 yr. anniversary) in 2012, Secrets of the Maya in 2012, King Tut in 2003 and 2013, Dinosaurs: A Bite Out of Time in 2014, Julius Caesar: Roman Military Might in 2015, "RACE: Are We So Different?" in 2016, Savage Ancient Seas in 2017, the 2017 Solar Eclipse in Columbia exhibit in the observatory, The Wizard of Oz in 2017 for Halloween, Hall of Heroes (superheroes) in 2019, 50 Years of the Apollo 11 Moon Landing (with items from SC astronaut Charles Duke) in 2019, and Sherlock Holmes: the International Exhibition in 2020 (with items from the Museum of London).
