= Wateree River =

River in South Carolina, United States

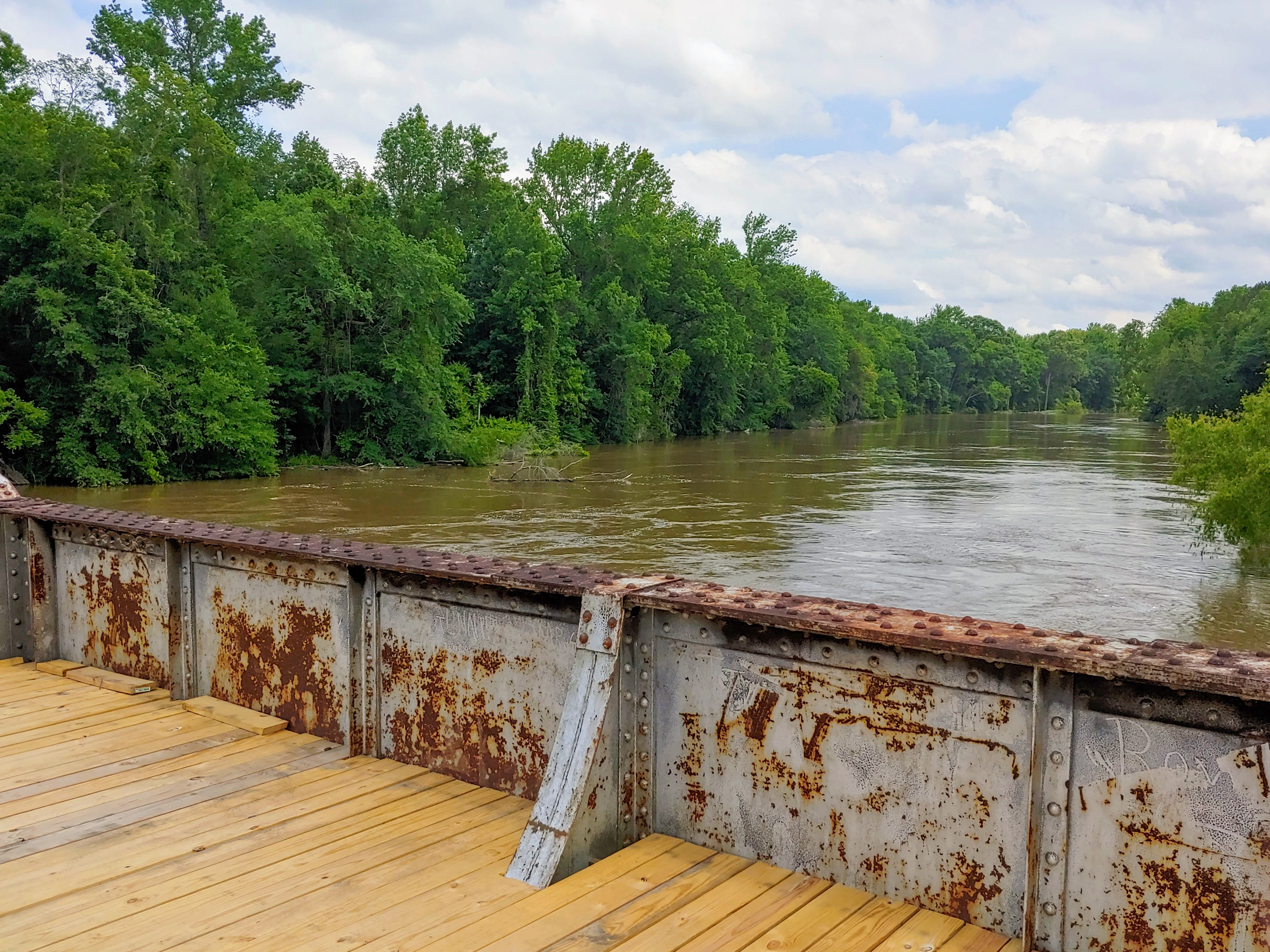
- Wateree River from the Palmetto Trail near Eastover, South Carolina

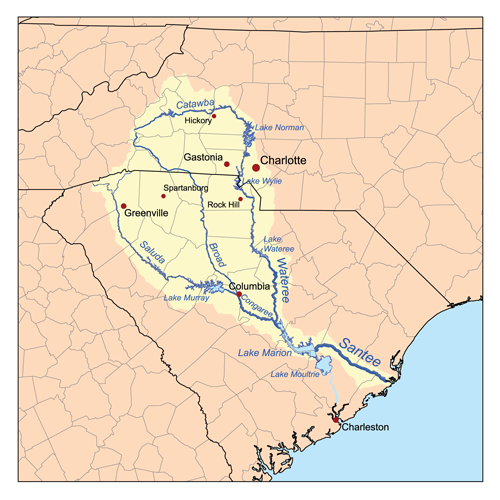
- The Wateree River

- Location of the mouth of Wateree River in South Carolina

Location
- Country: United States
- States: South Carolina
- Counties: Edgefield, Fairfield, Kershaw, Sumter, Richland

Physical characteristics
- Source: Catawba River
  - location: Liberty Hill, South Carolina
  - coordinates: 34°28′04″N 80°53′17″W
  - elevation: 223 ft (68 m)
- Mouth: Santee River
  - location: Fort Motte, South Carolina
  - coordinates: 33°44′39″N 80°37′09″W
  - elevation: 75 ft (23 m)
- Length: 75 mi (121 km)

Basin features
- Progression: Wateree → Santee → Atlantic Ocean
- River system: Catawba River

The Wateree River, about 75 mi (120 km) long, is a tributary of the Santee River in central South Carolina in the United States, which flows to the Atlantic Ocean. It was named for the Wateree Native Americans, a tribe who had migrated to this area from western North Carolina. They lived here until the early 18th century, when they were set upon and displaced by mostly English settlers during the Yamasee War. Survivors merged with the larger Catawba people, becoming extinct as a tribe.

== Course ==
The Wateree River is a continuation of the Catawba River, which flows from the Blue Ridge Mountains in North Carolina; this river had the different names of Catawba and Wateree assigned to different sections by different groups of settlers.

Today the name change is marked at the point where Wateree Creek empties into Lake Wateree. This is a manmade lake formed by Wateree Hydro Station Dam, a Duke Energy hydroelectric project built in the 20th century in Kershaw County, South Carolina.

The Wateree flows generally southward through Kershaw County and along the common boundary of Richland and Sumter counties, past the Piedmont town of Camden. It joins the Congaree River to form the Santee River about 35 mi (55 km) southeast of Columbia.

== Crossings ==
The following is a list of crossings along the short length of the Wateree

- US Route 1/US 601 in Camden & Lugoff
- Railroad bridge in Camden
- Interstate 20 in Camden
- Garner's Ferry Road US 378 near Stateburg & Eastover
- Two railroad bridges near the confluence with the Congaree River near Eastover

== See also ==
- List of South Carolina rivers

== Sources ==
- Columbia Gazetteer of North America entry
- DeLorme (1998). South Carolina Atlas & Gazetteer. Yarmouth, Maine: DeLorme. ISBN 0-89933-237-4.
- U.S. Geological Survey Geographic Names Information System: Wateree River, retrieved 6 February 2006
