= Friends of the Earth (US) =

American environmental organization

Friends of the Earth, U.S
- Founded: San Francisco, CA in 1969
- Type: Non-governmental organization
- Headquarters: Washington, DC and Berkeley, California
- President: Erich Pica
- Website: foe.org

Friends of the Earth U.S. is a non-governmental environmental organization headquartered in Washington, D.C., founded in 1969 by environmentalist David Brower. Friends of the Earth U.S. campaigns on issues including climate change, pollution, nuclear technology, genetic engineering, deforestation, pesticides, food and agriculture and economic policy. It is a founding member of Friends of the Earth International.

== Background ==
Friends of the Earth U.S. was founded in California in 1969 by environmentalist David Brower after he left the Sierra Club over his opposition to the Diablo Canyon nuclear plant. The organization was launched with the help of Donald Aitken, Jerry Mander and a $200,000 donation from the personal funds of Robert O. Anderson, founder of the ARCO petroleum company. One of its first major campaigns was the protest of nuclear power, particularly in California.

The organization merged with the Environmental Policy Center and the Oceanic Society in 1989.

Friends of the Earth International was founded in 1971 and today is a network of environmental organizations in 75 countries. In its early years, Friends of the Earth US was headquartered in San Francisco, but it was a largely decentralized organization, giving significant power and freedom to its local branches.

=== Friends of the Earth, Inc. v Laidlaw Environmental Services, Inc. ===
In 1999, Friends of the Earth represented residents near the North Tyger River in South Carolina in a case against Laidlaw Environmental Services, Inc. The case addressed the industrial pollution of the river. Although Laidlaw claimed that the case was moot, since the factory responsible for polluting the river had been closed, the Supreme Court held that the plaintiff had standing to sue because the residents alleged that they would have used the river for recreational purposes, but could not because of the pollution. Ruth Bader Ginsburg, writing for the majority wrote that the "aesthetic and recreational values of the area" had been lessened because of the defendant's repeated violations of its clean water permit.

== Projects and campaigns ==
=== Oceans and forests ===
The cruise industry has been criticized for the environmental impacts of their ships such as carbon emissions, air pollution, disposal of sewage and wastewater, and oil spills. This campaign has worked to pressure the International Maritime Organization to tighten and enforce international ship emissions standards including the Polar Code.

=== Economic policy ===
The campaign also targets some World Trade Organization agreements that are said to strike down environmental regulation to encourage profits.

== See also ==
- Biodiversity
- Ecology
- Environmentalism
- Genetically modified organisms
- Recycling
- Sustainability
- Environmental history of the United States
