= Oolenoy River =

Coordinates: 35.0008071°N 82.6938269°W

The Oolenoy River is a minor tributary of the Saluda River sourced near Sassafras Mountain in northern Pickens County, South Carolina. Approximately 37 miles in length, it empties into the South Fork Saluda River near Pumpkintown. It is part of the Santee River System.
