= Salkehatchie River =

River in South Carolina, United States

Coordinates: 32°47′31″N 80°52′47″W

The Salkehatchie River originates near the City of Barnwell, South Carolina and accepts drainage from Turkey Creek and Whippy Swamp before merging with the Little Salkehatchie River to form the Combahee River Basin, which empties into Saint Helena Sound and the Atlantic Ocean. Prior to the confluence, the Little Salkehatchie River accepts drainage from Lemon Creek, Buckhead Creek, and Willow Swamp.

United States General William Tecumseh Sherman of the American Civil War marched his troops across this river and the swamps surrounding it on his way to capture Columbia, South Carolina. This crossing included winning the Battle of Rivers' Bridge, defeating a Confederate force led by Major General Lafayette McLaws.

The University of South Carolina named its two-year regional campus after the Salkehatchie River. The river flows through Allendale, Bamberg, Barnwell, Colleton and Hampton counties, the same area served by University of South Carolina Salkehatchie.
