= Falls Park on the Reedy =

Park in Greenville, South Carolina, United States

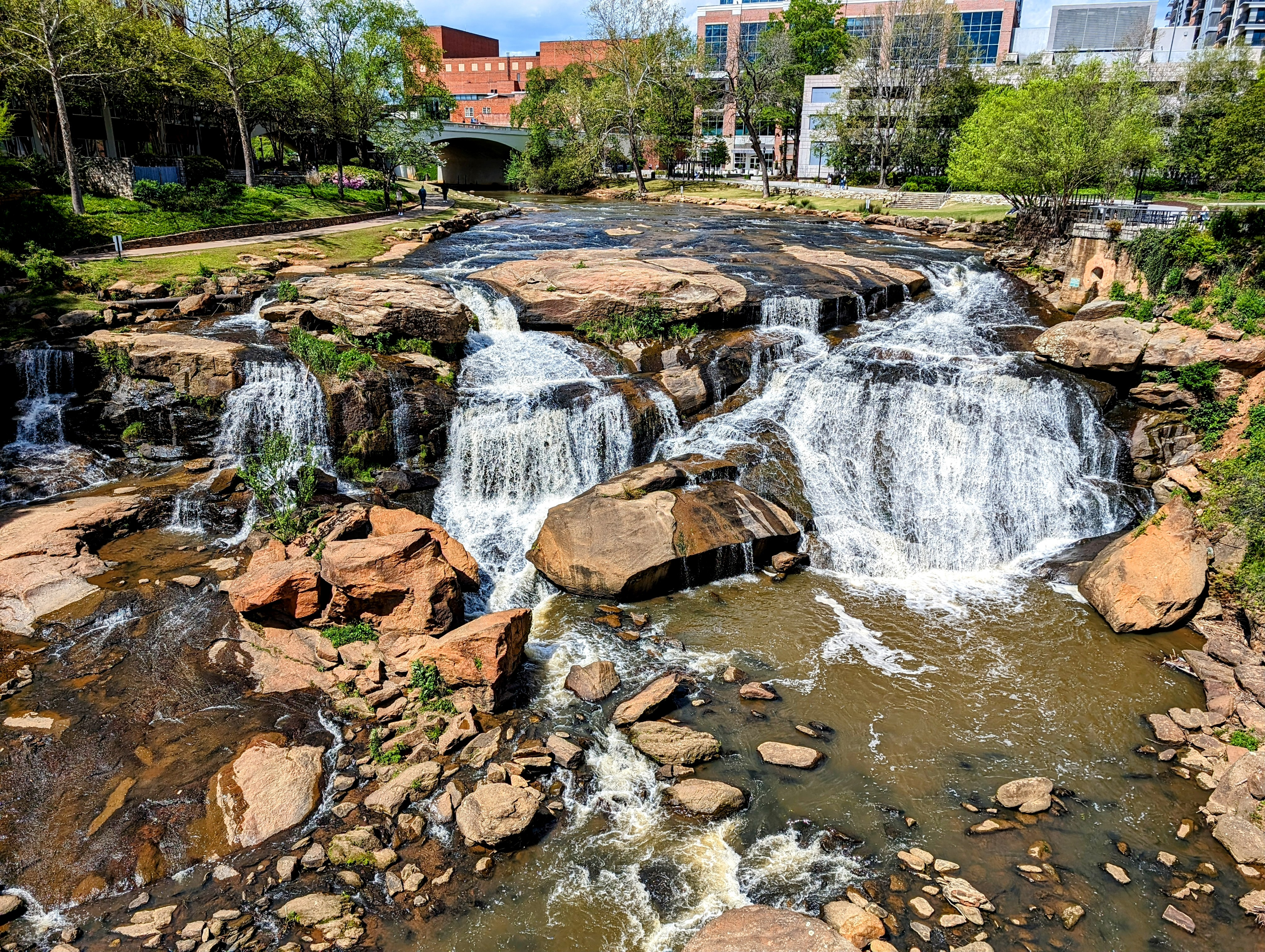

- Location within South Carolina Location within the United States
- Type: Urban park
- Location: Greenville, SC
- Coordinates: 34°50′40.6″N 82°24′04.5″W
- Area: 32 acres (0.13 km^{2})
- Created: 1967
- Owner: Greenville, SC
- Status: Open all year

- Reedy River Falls Historic Park and Greenway
- U.S. National Register of Historic Places
- Liberty Bridge

- Location within South Carolina Location within the United States
- Location: Both banks of Reedy River from the falls to Church St., Greenville, South Carolina
- Coordinates: 34°50′40″N 82°24′4″W
- Area: 8 acres (3.2 ha); 6 acres (2.4 ha) increase
- Built: 1812
- NRHP reference No.: 73001711 (original); 78003205 (increase)

Significant dates
- Added to NRHP: April 23, 1973
- Boundary increase: November 17, 1978

- Reedy River Industrial District
- U.S. National Register of Historic Places
- U.S. Historic district
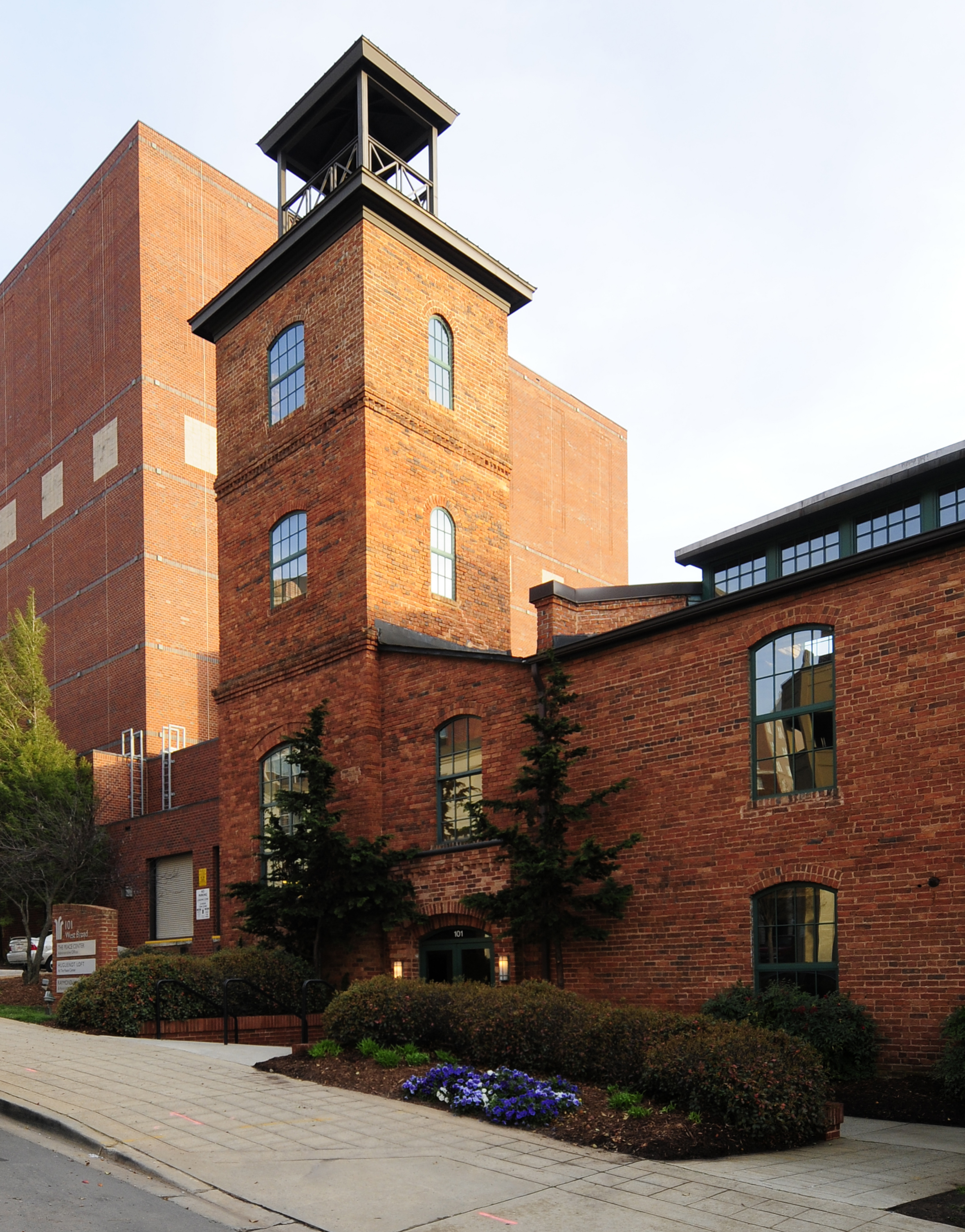

- Location within South Carolina Location within the United States
- Location: Along Reedy River between River St. and Camperdown Way, Greenville, South Carolina
- Coordinates: 34°50′48″N 82°24′6″W
- Area: 8 acres (3.2 ha)
- Architectural style: Italianate
- NRHP reference No.: 79002383
- Added to NRHP: February 14, 1979

Falls Park on the Reedy is a 32-acre (130,000 m^{2}) park adjacent to downtown Greenville, South Carolina, in the historic West End district. Considered the birthplace of Greenville, the park was founded in 1967 when the Carolina Foothills Garden Club reclaimed 26 acres (110,000 m^{2}) of land that had been previously used by textile mills. Renovation accelerated in the late 1990s under Mayor Knox H. White, prompting the formation of the Falls Park Endowment, a private charity supporting ongoing development. Each summer the park is home to the Upstate Shakespeare Festival.

The park's most striking feature is a unique pedestrian bridge that curves around a waterfall on the Reedy River. Named the Liberty Bridge at Falls Park on the Reedy, the 355-foot (108 m) long suspension bridge is supported by cables on only one side, giving an unobstructed view of the falls. It was designed by Boston firm Rosales + Partners with German firm Schlaich Bergermann & Partner as structural engineers and completed in September 2004. It was awarded the Arthur G. Hayden medal for innovative design in 2005.

Near the bridge, the Main Street entrance to the park is graced by Bryan Hunt's 16 ft (4.9 m) bronze sculpture Fall Lake Falls and contains a restaurant and other visitor amenities at the new Falls Park Center.

The park also features a collection of public gardens and a wall from the original 1776 grist mill built on the site.

Falls Park on the Reedy in Greenville, SC

== Bell Tower Mall and county offices ==
The men's campus of Furman University, now located outside of the nearby town of Travelers Rest, was situated in the southern area of the park and on the bluff further to the south overlooking the area between 1851 and 1958. In 1961 feasibility studies for new development on the land were taken, and in 1965, Bell Tower Associates announced plans for the 'Bell Tower Shopping Mall', which opened in July 1970. In 1982, the mall's primary anchor, Woolco, shuttered, and the mall entered a decline. In 1984 the Furman Company, now Furman Realty would suggest local government utilize the building as office space. After some additions and modifications, Greenville County would move its offices into the building in 1987. As of 2023, plans to demolish the building and once again relocate the county offices have been put into motion.
