= Lake Lure (North Carolina) =

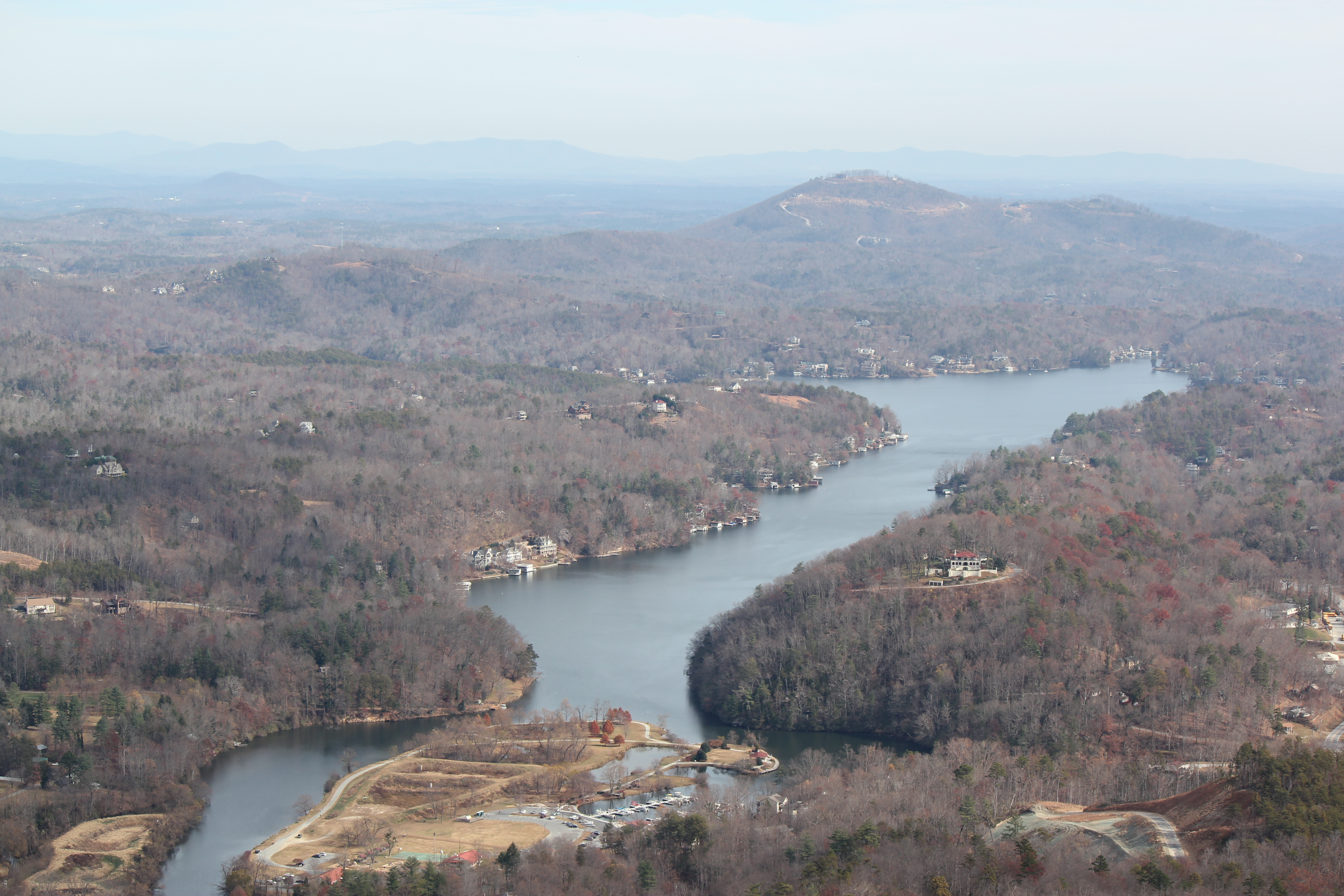

- Location within North Carolina Location within the United States
- Location: Rutherford County, North Carolina
- Coordinates: 35°25′55″N 82°11′50″W
- Lake type: reservoir
- Primary inflows: Broad River
- Primary outflows: Broad River
- Basin countries: United States
- Surface area: 717 acres (2.9 km^{2})
- Surface elevation: 990 ft (300 m)
- Settlements: Lake Lure, North Carolina

Lake Lure is a reservoir, located near the eponymous town of Lake Lure, North Carolina.

== History ==
In 1925, the Morse family created Carolina Mountain Power Company. This company funded dam construction on the Broad River which produced the lake after which the town is named. The dam took two years to build and Lake Lure was finally impounded and filled by 1927. At ordinary water levels, Lake Lure covers approximately 720 acres (2.9 km^{2}) and has a shoreline of approximately 27 miles (43 km). In 1928, the hydroelectric plant began generating electricity for the Blue Ridge Power Company, one of the companies taken over by Duke Power.

Lake Lure, including the dam, was used for filming multiple scenes in the 1987 film Dirty Dancing.

The lake is the primary attraction and source of money for the town of Lake Lure. Canoeing, fishing, water skiing, and pleasure boating are some of the activities usually enjoyed on the lake; both motorized and non-motorized boats are allowed on the lake. Fishers can catch rainbow trout, brown trout, crappie, largemouth bass, and catfish on the lake and the nearby streams of the Hickory Nut gorge.

During Hurricane Helene in 2024, Lake Lure received excessive rain over two days, causing the lake to fill and overtop the dam, which compromised structural supports and eroded both sides around the dam, prompting local officials to call for mandatory evacuations for areas downstream of the dam. In 2025, the Army Corps of Engineers drained most of the lake so that sediment and debris from the 2024 flood could be removed. On April 20, 2026, the lake reached its normal operating range of 989.60 feet, and began a "soft opening" process, where boats were allowed on the lake with a strict no wake requirement.
