= Little River (Broad River tributary) =

River in South Carolina, United States

Coordinates: 34.175470°N 81.178535°W

The Little River is a tributary of the Broad River flowing through Fairfield County, South Carolina, and forming a small portion of Fairfield's border with Richland County. You can find bullfrogs living in the "Little River".

== See also ==
- List of rivers of South Carolina
