= Downtown Greenville, South Carolina =

Central district of Greenville, South Carolina, United States

Downtown Greenville
- District of Greenville, South Carolina
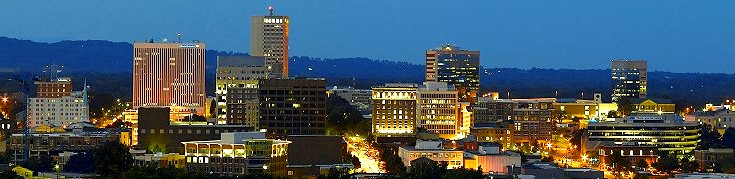

- Location within South Carolina Location within the United States
- Coordinates: 34°50′56″N 82°24′01″W
- Country: United States
- State: South Carolina
- County: Greenville
- City: Greenville
- Elevation: 984 ft (300 m)
- Time zone: UTC-5 (Eastern (EST))
  - Summer (DST): UTC-4 (EDT)
- ZIP code: 29601
- Area codes: 864, 821
- FIPS code: 45045
- GNIS feature ID: 1245842
- Website: https://www.greenvillesc.gov

Downtown Greenville is the downtown area of Greenville, South Carolina, United States. It contains the city's central business district and urban areas such as Falls Park on the Reedy and the Landmark Building. It is also home to many restaurants, hotels and stores such as Anthropologie, Free People, J. McLaughlin, Lululemon, Orvis, Warby Parker and other national chains and locally owned stores.

The boundary extends about 2 miles around with the center being the Poinsett Hotel.

The downtown area encompasses the City Hall and Bon Secours Wellness Arena.

== See also ==
- Greenville, South Carolina
