= Bull Swamp Creek (South Carolina) =

Stream in South Carolina, United States

Coordinates: 33°34′39″N 81°02′05″W

Bull Swamp Creek is a stream that flows from a small pond in Gaston, in Lexington County, South Carolina, United States to the North Fork Edisto River in North in Orangeburg County.
