= Lake Greenwood (South Carolina) =

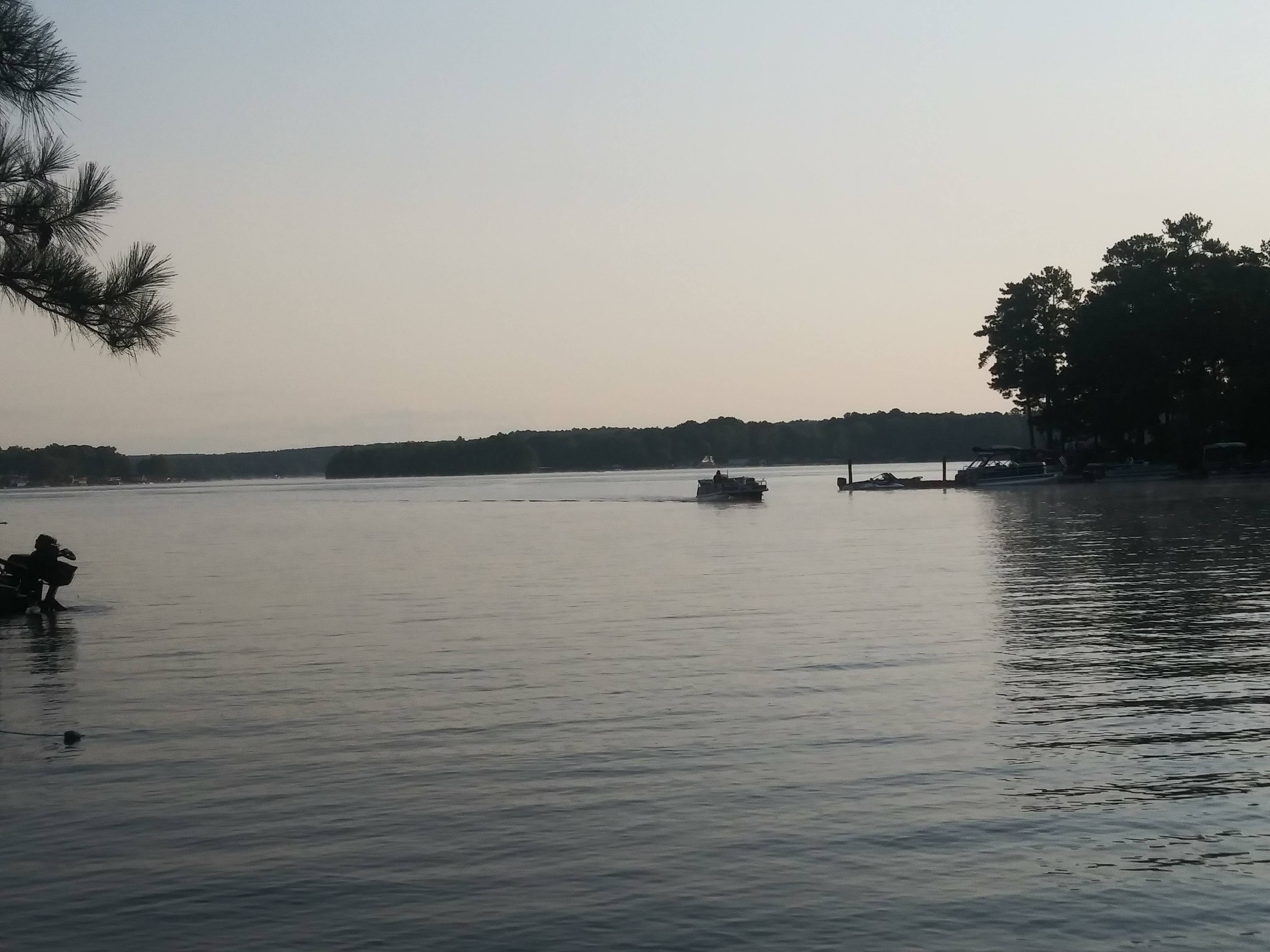

- Location within South Carolina
- Location: Greenwood / Laurens / Newberry counties, South Carolina, United States
- Coordinates: 34.228835°N 81.977835°W
- Type: reservoir
- Primary inflows: Saluda River
- Primary outflows: Saluda River
- Basin countries: United States
- Surface area: 11,400 acres (46 km^{2})
- Average depth: 21.8 ft (6.6 m)
- Max. depth: 69.3 ft (21.1 m)
- Surface elevation: 439 ft (134 m)

Lake Greenwood was formed by a hydroelectric dam built across the Saluda River near Chappells SC. The impoundment was licensed by the Federal Power Commission, predecessor to the current Federal Energy Regulatory Commission (FERC), as the Buzzards Roost Project. The project was re-licensed by FERC in 1995. The FERC Project No is P-1267. The lake has 212 miles (341 km) of shoreline and 11,400 acres (46 km^{2}). While the waters of Lake Greenwood extend into three counties (Greenwood, Laurens and Newberry counties), Greenwood County actually owns the entire lake bed, having purchased all properties comprising the bed of the lake from farmers along both sides of the rivers in the late 1930s. Funding was provided by loans from the Public Works Administration during the Great Depression. All loans were later repaid in full. The Saluda River, the Reedy River and Rabon Creek come together to feed Lake Greenwood. There is also a local watershed surrounding the basin from which local rain also drains into the reservoir. Water released from Lake Greenwood feeds into the Saluda River at Chappells, which ultimately feeds into Lake Murray.

Because the Buzzards Roost Project was formed to provide hydroelectric power to the local area, in direct competition with Duke Power Company, and at significantly lower rates, Duke Power vigorously challenged the project on various legal grounds. However, a ruling by the United States Supreme Court ultimately cleared the way for the project to be built using the federal loans.

Greenwood County, via the Greenwood County Electric Power Commission, a special purpose directed created by Act of the S.C. General Assembly, operated the Buzzards Roost Project until the mid-1960s. At that time, Duke Power made an offer to purchase the county's electric distribution network and customer base for $10,000,000, as well as to lease the hydroelectric facility from Greenwood County, for a period of 40 years, at an annual rental of $250,000 per year. Some local residents favored the sale. Others opposed the sale. Articles published in the local Greenwood newspaper, the Index Journal, present a wealth of information about different views of the proposed sale. The S.C. General Assembly ultimately decided to put the matter to a referendum before the voters in Greenwood County. Greenwood state Senator Frances B. Nicholson opposed the sale, and Greenwood state Representative John W. Drummond supported the sale. Drummond simultaneously challenged Nicholson in his bid for re-election to the senate seat. The referendum was passed by the voters, and Drummond defeated Nicholson in the race for the Greenwood senate seat. However, Senator Nicholson, fearing that local officials might spend the purchase money unwisely, had caused a provision to be inserted into the South Carolina Constitution stating that the proceeds from the sale could never be spent, but instead, had to be invested so that Greenwood County could only receive the interest. Section 13 of Article XVII of the S.C. Constitution is unique to the state constitution, and it can only be amended by a statewide vote, among other requirements. In addition, Senator Nicholson added the requirement that Duke Power pay all costs of repairs during the lease as well as pay all costs of re-licensing with FERC in 1985. An additional provision, suggested by an employee of Duke Power, was that all customers of Greenwood County at the time of the sale would continue to keep their existing county power rates forever, unless one of a couple of triggers occurred, at which point the customers would be switched to the Duke power rates. It has been estimated that about 9,000 properties fell under those provisions at the time of the sale. For a period of time, Duke power rates fell below the county power rate, and many owners elected to give up their grandfathered status. However, after the inflationary increases in the cost of electricity in the early 1970s, all customers who were still receiving the old county rate at that time effectively had their rates locked in forever (still subject to a few possible triggers). Duke Power attempted to avoid having to honor that provision of its agreement, but the S.C. Supreme Court rejected all of Duke's arguments. In the early 2000s, it was estimated that approximately 3,000 properties in Greenwood County still had the old county rate for electricity and that the net cost to Duke was approximately $1,000,000 a year in lost profits for those customers.

Residential and commercial uses adjoining Lake Greenwood have contributed tremendously to the economic development of this rural area. Lake Greenwood is also used for recreational boating and fishing, and Greenwood County regularly stocks the lake with fish in consultation with the S.C. Department of Natural Resources and the U.S. Fish and Wildlife Service.

== See also ==
- List of lakes in South Carolina
