= Gills Creek =

Stream in Richland County, South Carolina, U.S.

Coordinates: 33.909277°N 81.014708°W

Gills Creek is a stream in Richland County, South Carolina which drains into the Congaree River. Gills Creek was settled primarily in the 1780s and since the 1960s the creek area has become highly urbanized as part of the region around Columbia, South Carolina. The watershed includes over 70 miles of streams and tributaries and has become significantly polluted with the urbanization.

== Geography ==
Gills Creek is located entirely in what is currently metropolitan Columbia, South Carolina and empties into the Congaree River. The creek originates at a small spring-fed pond.

The mean streamflow is 77 cubic feet per second.

== Watershed ==
The Gills Creek watershed includes over 70 miles and 47,000 acres of land made up of Gills Creek and a number of tributaries (including Jackson Creek and Little Jackson Creek, among others). The watershed is considered "one of the largest impaired urban watersheds" in South Carolina. A 1999 United States Geological Survey report found high pesticide levels in Gills Creek which could be harmful to fish populations (although not above Environmental Protection Agency drinking standards) and fecal coliform levels that make the creek not "safe for swimming or other direct bodycontact activities."

== History ==
The creek was named after James Gill, a settler in the 1740s. In the 1780s, Wade Hampton I and Thomas Taylor bought large tracts of land and set up plantations on the East and West sides of the Gills Creek. Part of Taylor's plantation would eventually become the city of Columbia with legislation passed in 1786. The area remained largely agricultural until the Gills Creek swamp was drained and Camp Jackson was founded in 1917. Additional drainage and damming followed and led to the incorporation of the city of Forest Acres in 1935. Urban development followed in the early 1960s and the area is now largely settled and there is little barren or agricultural land use.

From October 1–5, 2015, a large portion of South Carolina and southern North Carolina received over a foot of rain, and totals exceeded 20 inches across much of eastern South Carolina. Columbia (the capital) broke its all-time wettest 1-day, 2-day, and 3-day periods on record with Sunday, October 4 being the wettest day in the history of the city. This event was characterized as a 1000 year rainfall event. A Federal state of emergency was declared for South Carolina on October 3. Five dams in the Gills Creek Watershed breached: Pinetree Lake, Semmes Lake, Upper Rocky Ford Lake, Rocky Ford Lake, and Cary Lake. The extensive flooding has caused several deaths, displaced an unknown number of residents, washed out a number of roads and bridges, and caused a yet-to-be-determined amount of property damage.

== Crossings ==
The following is a list of crossings of Gills Creek. List may be incomplete. Begins at the Congaree River

- Bluff Road
- Interstate 77
- Shop Road
- Garners Ferry Road
- Rosewood Drive
- Devine Street
- Fort Jackson Blvd
- Kilbourne Road
- Quail Lane
- Forest Drive
- Eastshore Road
- Boyden Arbor Road
- (2 Unknown Roads)
- Park Road
- 6TH Division Road
- Percival Road
- Marsh Deer Way
- Interstate 20
- Gills Crossing Road

== Advocacy groups ==
The Gills Creek Watershed Association is a partnership of citizens, government, organizations, and business dedicated to restoring and protecting the Gills Creek Watershed.
