= Saluda River =

River in South Carolina, USA

Coordinates: 34.005756°N 81.063046°W

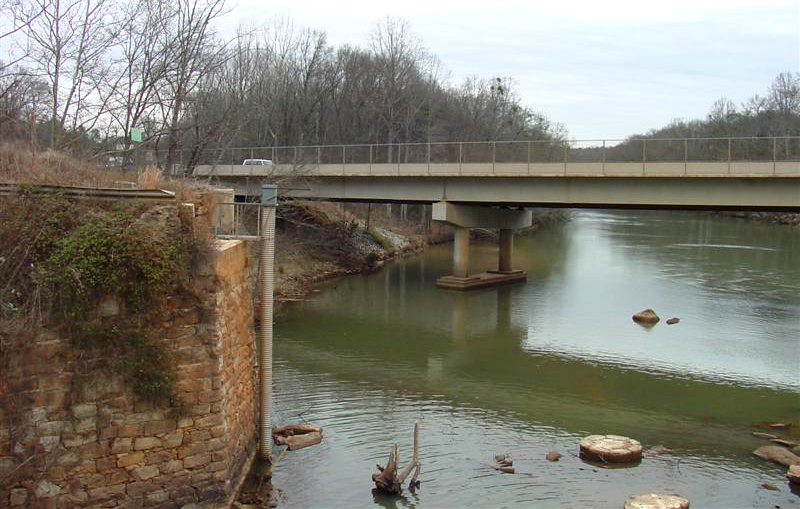
- The Saluda River at Pelzer, South Carolina

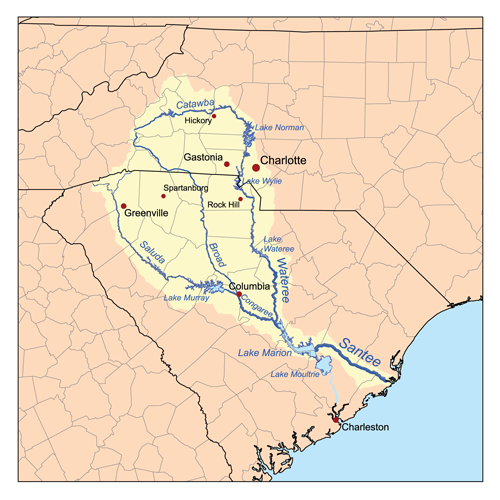
- Map of the Santee River watershed showing the Saluda River.

Location
- Country: United States
- State: South Carolina

Physical characteristics
- Source
  - location: Greenville County, South Carolina, South Carolina
- Mouth: Congaree River
  - location: Columbia, Richland County, South Carolina
  - elevation: 118 ft (36 m)
- Length: 200 mi (320 km)
- Discharge
  - location: Congaree River, Columbia, South Carolina

Basin features
- Progression: Saluda → Congaree → Santee → Atlantic Ocean
- River system: Saluda River
- Tributaries
  - left: Reedy River
  - right: Little Saluda River

The Saluda River is a principal tributary of the Congaree River, about 200 mi (320 km) long, in northern and western South Carolina in the United States. Via the Congaree River, it is part of the watershed of the Santee River, which flows to the Atlantic Ocean.

== Course ==
The Saluda River is formed about 10 mi (15 km) northwest of the city of Greenville, on the common boundary of Greenville and Pickens Counties, by the confluence of its north and south forks, each of which rises in the Blue Ridge Mountains very near the border of North Carolina at Saluda, North Carolina:

- The North Saluda River flows generally south-southwestwardly through northern Greenville County, past Marietta.
- The South Saluda River flows generally southeastwardly on the Greenville-Pickens County border, receiving the Oolenoy River and the Middle Saluda River, which rises in Jones Gap State Park and flows generally southward through northwestern Greenville County.

From this confluence the Saluda River flows generally southeastwardly through the Piedmont region, through or along the boundaries of Pickens, Greenville, Anderson, Abbeville, Laurens, Greenwood, Newberry, Saluda, Lexington and Richland Counties, past the towns of Piedmont, West Pelzer, Pelzer, Ware Shoals and West Columbia. It joins the Broad River in Columbia to form the Congaree River.

== Dams ==
Dams on the Saluda include:

- The uppermost dam on the Saluda River, on the border of Greenville and Pickens Counties, forming Saluda Lake
- the old textile mill dam in Piedmont
- The textile mill dam at Pelzer
- The Pelzer Mills Dam, near Williamston
- The Lee Steam Plant Dam near Williamston
- The Holiday Dam near Belton
- a still-operating dam built to power the textile mill in Ware Shoals
- Greenwood dam, creating Lake Greenwood
- Dreher Shoals Dam creating Lake Murray

== Principal tributaries ==
- The Reedy River flows into Lake Greenwood from the north in Laurens County.
- The Little River flows into the Saluda from the north in Newberry County.
- The Bush River flows into Lake Murray from the north in Newberry County.
- The Little Saluda River flows into Lake Murray from the south in Saluda County; it is formed at the town of Saluda by the confluence of Mine Creek and Red Bank Creek.

== Crossings ==
As it travels downstream, the Saluda river is crossed several times. (Note: this list may at times be incomplete)

- Greenville County/Pickens County/Anderson County
  - Old Hunts Bridge Road
  - SC 183/Farrs Bridge Road
  - Saluda Dam Road
  - SC 124/Old Easley Highway
  - New Easley Highway (U.S. 123)
  - Old Easley Bridge Road
  - Anderson Road (Old Dunham Bridge - SC 81) Powdersville/Greenville
  - Frontage Road
  - Interstate 85
  - SC 153
  - Anderson Street in Piedmont, South Carolina (SC 86)
  - Piedmont Highway (SC 20) in Pelzer, South Carolina
  - SC 8 in Pelzer
  - Lee Steam Plant Road
  - Cooley Bridge Road in Belton, South Carolina
  - Holiday Dam Road
  - US 76 in Honea Path, South Carolina
- Laurens County/Abbeville County/Greenwood County
  - Erwin Mill Road
  - Maddox Bridge Road
  - SC 252 (Old Bridge) in Ware Shoals, South Carolina
  - East Main Street in Ware Shoals
  - US 25 in Ware Shoals
- Lake Greenwood
  - Old Laurens-Greenwood Highway
  - Greenwood Highway (SC 72/US 221) in Lake Shores, South Carolina
- Newberry County/Saluda County
  - Ninety-Six Highway (SC 34)
  - SC 39 in Chappells, South Carolina
  - Newberry Highway (SC 121)
- Lake Murray
  - Kempson Bridge Road (SC 395)
  - SC 391 near Prosperity, South Carolina (also crosses the Little Saluda River)
  - Dreher Shoals Dam (SC 6)
- Columbia/West Columbia
  - Interstate 20
  - Interstate 26
  - Riverbanks Zoo (footbridge)

== Variant names ==
According to the Geographic Names Information System, the Saluda River has also been known as:

- Chickawa
- Corn River
- Saludy River
- Saluta River
- Salutah River
- Santee River
- Seleuda River

The river is named after an Indian tribe that once lived along its banks near the community of Chappells, South Carolina.

== Save Our Saluda ==
In 2008, a collective of local citizens (or Citizens Action Group) based in Marietta, Greenville County, South Carolina initiated a campaign to "Save Our Saluda" following what they perceived to be aggressive property development. Their mission is to "(protect) and (preserve) the headwaters of the Saluda watershed through concerned citizens action".

== Endangered Status ==
In April 2009, the Saluda River was named by American Rivers, a leading river conservation group to a list of rivers in the United States that are under imminent threat by dams, industry or development. The article, posted on CNN on April 7, 2009 stated "Excess levels of sewage waste threaten the drinking water of more than 500,000 South Carolina residents, conservationists say. Sewage in the river increases phosphorus and algae levels, depletes oxygen, and kills fish and other aquatic life. American Rivers is asking the South Carolina Department of Health and Environmental Control to improve sewage-treatment standards and ensure the river reduces its phosphorus levels by 25 to 50 percent."

== See also ==
- List of South Carolina rivers

== Sources ==
- Columbia Gazetteer of North America entry
- DeLorme (1998). South Carolina Atlas & Gazetteer. Yarmouth, Maine: DeLorme. ISBN 0-89933-237-4.
- U.S. Geological Survey Geographic Names Information System: Saluda River
- U.S. Geological Survey Geographic Names Information System: Little Saluda River
- U.S. Geological Survey Geographic Names Information System: Middle Saluda River
- U.S. Geological Survey Geographic Names Information System: North Saluda River
- U.S. Geological Survey Geographic Names Information System: South Saluda River
- SC DNR Middle Saluda River
- Save Our Saluda website
