= Fairforest Creek =

Stream in Union and Spartanburg County, South Carolina, U.S.

Coordinates: 34°35′56″N 81°36′52″W

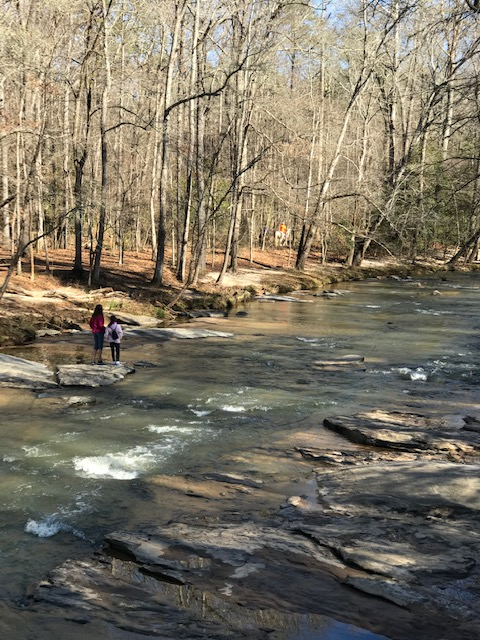
Picture of Fairforest Creek.

Fairforest Creek is a stream in Union and Spartanburg counties, in the U.S. state of South Carolina.

According to tradition, a pioneer named the region when, noting the scenery, he said "What a fair forest!"

== See also ==
- List of rivers of South Carolina
