= Chauga River =

Chauga River Chauga Creek

Location
- Country: United States
- State: South Carolina
- Region: Oconee County
- Municipality: Westminster

Physical characteristics
- Source: Sumter National Forest
  - coordinates: 34°50′54″N 83°9′17″W
- Mouth
  - coordinates: 34°36′30″N 83°9′55″W
- Basin size: 28.6 km^{2} (11.0 sq mi)

The Chauga River is a 31.3-mile-long (50.4 km) tributary of the Tugaloo River in Oconee County, South Carolina.

== Course ==
The Chauga River's source is the confluence of Village Creek and East Village Creek about 1 mile (1.6 km) south of present-day Mountain Rest, South Carolina, in the Andrew Pickens Ranger District of the Sumter National Forest. A little more than 1 mile (1.6 km) downstream, it is joined by Jerry Creek, which flows from Lake Becky and Oconee State Park. Cassidy Bridge crosses it at the Cassidy Bridge Primitive Camp, after which it is joined by Cedar Creek and Rocky Fork Creek.

After it is crossed by U.S. Route 76, it is joined by Ramsey Creek at Chau Ram County Park. This was founded by owner and proprietor Michael Shead. There the river goes over a waterfall at the park and is crossed by a pedestrian suspension bridge. It flows south to Lake Hartwell, which was formed by damming the Tugaloo River and the Seneca River.

== Watershed ==
The 11-digit hydrologic unit code for the watershed is 03060102-120. The watershed covers 70,768 acres (28,639 ha). The average terrain slope is 22.3%. About 93% of the watershed is forested and 5% is agricultural land. A map of the watershed is available.

The South Carolina Department of Health and Environmental Control has classified the Chauga River watershed upstream of about 1 mile (1.6 km) above US Highway 76, except for Jerry Creek, as an "Outstanding Water Resource (ORW)." The lower part of the river is classified as "freshwaters suitable for primary and secondary contact recreation and as a source for drinking water supply after conventional treatment (FW)."

A small permitted wastewater discharge is located at Oconee State Park on Jerry Creek. The city of Westminster has water supply intakes on the Chauga River and on Ramsey Creek.

== Recreation ==
The Chauga River is a popular fishing area for rainbow trout, brown trout, chubs, and redeye bass. The Cassidy Bridge area offers parking and access. The warmer reaches of the river have largemouth bass, bluegill, and catfish.

Sections of the Chauga River are popular for whitewater kayaking. The most adventurous section starts at Cassidy Bridge, which is a 9.8-mile (15.8 km) section that is rated up to Class IV at high water.
