= Little Salkehatchie River =

Stream in South Carolina, U.S.

Coordinates: 32°47′32″N 80°52′48″W

The Little Salkehatchie River is a stream in Barnwell, Bamberg, and Colleton counties in the U.S. state of South Carolina. It originates in the Town of Blackville and accepts drainage from Lake Cynthia, Guess Pond, Brooker Pond, Ghants Branch, Halfmoon Branch, and Long Gall Branch. Further downstream, the river accepts drainage from Long Pond, Ben Rice Bay, Colston Branch (Ben Rice Branch, Doussoss Bay, Indian Camp Branch, McMillian Branch), and Long Branch (Little Clear Pond, Clear Pond). There are a total of 111.7 stream miles and 397.4 acres (1.608 km^{2}) of lake waters in this watershed, all classified freshwater.
