= Sumter National Forest =

U.S. national forest in South Carolina

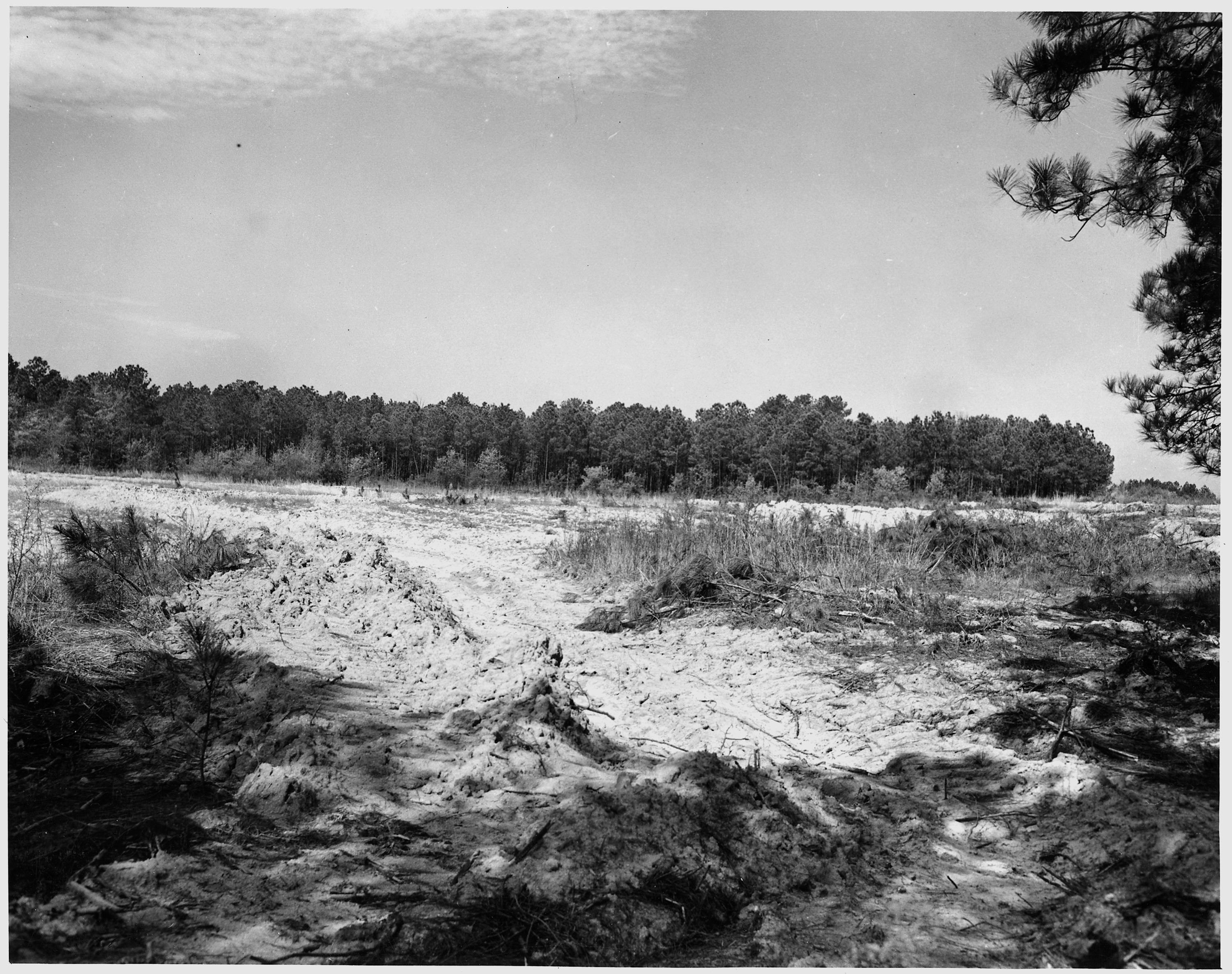
- Submarginal private lands inside the Sumter National Forest which should be in trees instead of terraced for cultivation. (April 1941)

- Location within the United States
- Location: South Carolina, United States
- Nearest city: Clinton, SC
- Coordinates: 34°34′06″N 81°35′31″W
- Area: 370,901 acres (1,500.98 km^{2})
- Max. elevation: Fork Mountain: 3,294 ft. (1,004 m), 34.9927, -83.0801
- Established: July 13, 1936
- Governing body: U.S. Forest Service
- Website: www.fs.usda.gov/r08/francismarionsumter

The Sumter National Forest is one of two forests in South Carolina that are managed together by the United States Forest Service, the other being the Francis Marion National Forest. The Sumter National Forest consists of 370,442 acres (1,499.13 km^{2}) which are divided into 3 distinct sections in western and central South Carolina. The Enoree Ranger District is the largest, comprising roughly 170,000 acres in Chester, Fairfield, Laurens, Newberry, and Union counties. Next is the Long Cane Ranger District, comprising about 120,000 acres in Abbeville, Edgefield, Greenwood, McCormick, and Saluda counties. The smallest district is the Andrew Pickens Ranger District comprising over 85,000 acres which lies entirely in Oconee county and is part of the Appalachian Mountains. Forest headquarters of both South Carolina forests are located together in the state's capital city of Columbia.

== History ==
In July 1936, President Franklin D. Roosevelt proclaimed the Sumter a separate National Forest. The Sumter is named for Thomas Sumter, a leader of patriot regular and military forces in the South Carolina piedmont during the American Revolution and war hero. The lands that became the Sumter were predominantly eroding old farm fields and gullies or extensively logged forests. Once the lands became part of the Sumter, the process of controlling soil erosion, regulating the flow of streams and the production of timber began. Over time, the land has been slowly restored and has become productive again.

== Andrew Pickens Ranger District ==
The Andrew Pickens Ranger District is situated in the mountains of northwest South Carolina in Oconee County. Local place names and streams attest the Cherokee Indian heritage of the area, including the Chattooga, Chauga, Cheohee, Tugaloo, Toxaway, Keowee, Oconee, Tamassee, and Jocassee rivers or creeks. The Ranger District is named for Andrew Pickens, commander of South Carolina rebel militia during the American Revolution. The ranger district offices are located near Mountain Rest. The Andrew Pickens Ranger District is home to the Chattooga River, a popular angling and whitewater destination. The Ellicott Rock Wilderness offers opportunities for solitude and primitive camping. The district also has numerous waterfalls and hiking trails.

== Enoree Ranger District ==
The ranger district offices are located in Whitmire, just between Union and Newberry. Interstate 26 runs along the southwest side of the district. US Hwy. 176 and SC Hwy. 72 crisscross the district. The Enoree is well-known for its recreation opportunities on the Enoree, Tyger and Broad rivers, as well as a challenging Off-Highway Vehicle (OHV) trail. It also offers outstanding hiking, boating, hunting target shooting and equestrian opportunities.

== Long Cane Ranger District ==
The Long Cane Ranger District of the Sumter National Forest is located in west central South Carolina, along the Georgia border. It is spread around the towns of Greenwood, Abbeville, McCormick and Edgefield. The ranger district offices are located in Edgefield. The Long Cane is home to the Forks Area Trail System, an internationally known biking trail network. Both piedmont districts offer outstanding hiking, boating, hunting, target shooting and equestrian opportunities.

== Today ==
The Sumter National Forest includes approximately 2,859 acres (11.57 km^{2}) of the Ellicott Rock Wilderness, the only wilderness to straddle three states (South Carolina, Georgia, and North Carolina). The Sumter also has, as its western border, the Chattooga River, a Wild and Scenic River. The Andrew Pickens District is also home to 15 waterfalls with drops ranging from 12 ft (4 m) to 75 ft (23 m).

== Forests ==
The Enoree and Long Cane Ranger district support Southeastern mixed forests. The Andrew Pickens ranger district has Appalachian-Blue Ridge forests.

== Recreation ==
Sumter national Forest offers a wide variety of activities such as hiking, backpacking, canoeing, horse back riding, mountain biking, motorcycle and ATV riding, target shooting, camping, hunting, and fishing.

== See also ==
- List of national forests of the United States
