= Santee River =

River in South Carolina, United States

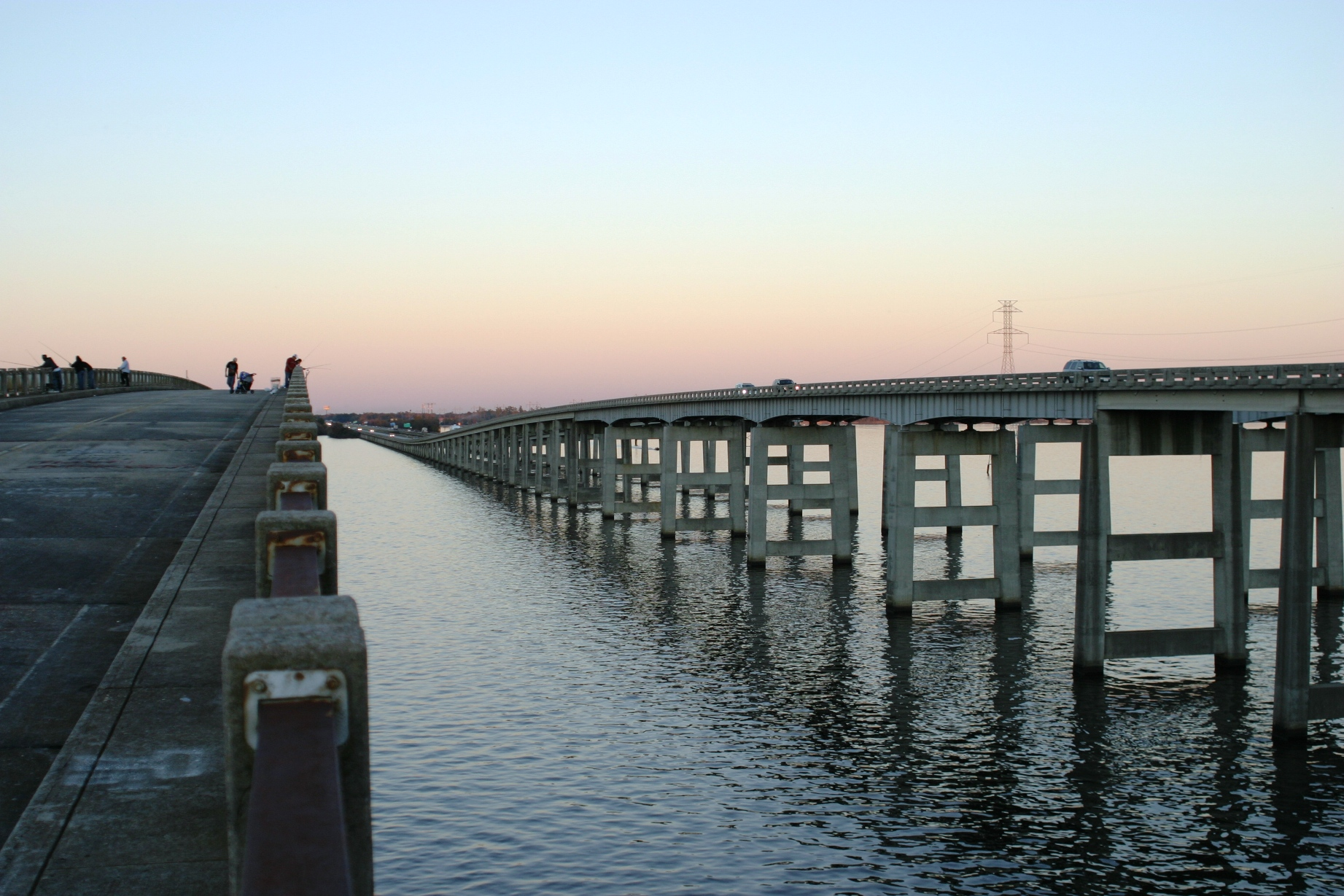
- I-95 over Lake Marion

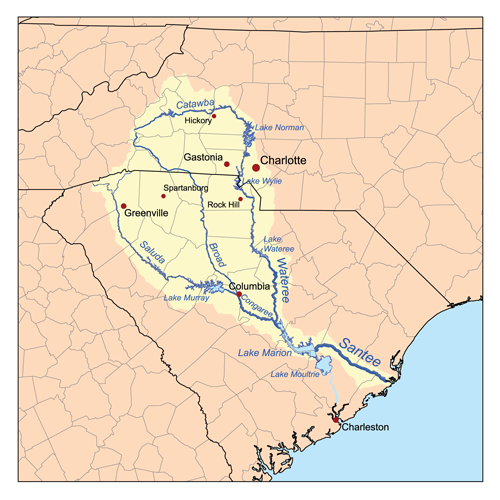
- The Santee River Watershed

Location
- Country: United States
- States: South Carolina
- Cities: Santee, SC, Cross, SC, Bonneau, SC, Moncks Corner, SC

Physical characteristics
- Source: Confluence of Congaree River and Wateree Rivers
  - location: Near Fort Motte, SC
  - coordinates: 33°44′31.78″N 80°37′02.42″W
  - elevation: 75 ft (23 m)
- Mouth: Atlantic Ocean
  - location: Charleston County, SC, Georgetown County, SC
  - coordinates: 33°07′48.96″N 79°15′31.73″W
  - elevation: 0 ft (0 m)
- Length: 143 mi (230 km)

The Santee River is a river in South Carolina in the United States, and is 143 miles (230 km) long. The Santee and its tributaries provide the principal drainage for the coastal areas of southeastern South Carolina and navigation for the central coastal plain of South Carolina, emptying into the Atlantic Ocean about halfway between Myrtle Beach and Charleston near the community of McClellanville. The farthest headwaters are 440 miles (708 km) away on the Catawba River in North Carolina. Besides the Catawba, other principal rivers of the Santee watershed include the Congaree, Broad, Linville, Saluda and the Wateree. The watershed drains a large portion of the Piedmont regions of South and North Carolina. The Santee River is the second largest river on the eastern coast of the United States, second only to the Susquehanna River in drainage area and flow. Much of the upper river is impounded by the expansive, horn-shaped Lake Marion reservoir, formed by the 8-mile (13 km)-long Santee Dam. The dam was built during the Great Depression of the 1930s as a Works Progress Administration (WPA) project to provide a major source of hydroelectric power for the state of South Carolina.

== Description ==
The Santee is formed in central South Carolina 25 miles (40 km) southeast of Columbia by the confluence of the rivers Wateree and Congaree. It flows southeast for 5 miles (8 km) before entering the northwest corner of Lake Marion, which stretches in a long wide arc to the southeast for approximately 30 miles (48 km) to Santee Dam. A navigable diversion canal first built during the 1970s at the southern end of the lake connects to Lake Moultrie, a reservoir on the nearby Cooper River. The modern canal is operated by the Santee Cooper agency as part of the larger hydroelectric project on both rivers. The dam was finished in 1941.

Downstream from the reservoir it flows east, then southeast, forming the northeast boundary of Francis Marion National Forest. Approximately 10 miles (16 km) from its mouth it bifurcates into two channels, named the North Santee and South Santee, that flow parallel and separated by approximately 2 miles (3 km), creating Cedar Island. The two channels reach the ocean at Santee Point, approximately 15 miles (24 km) south of Georgetown, and not far from the outlet of the Pee Dee River.

== History ==
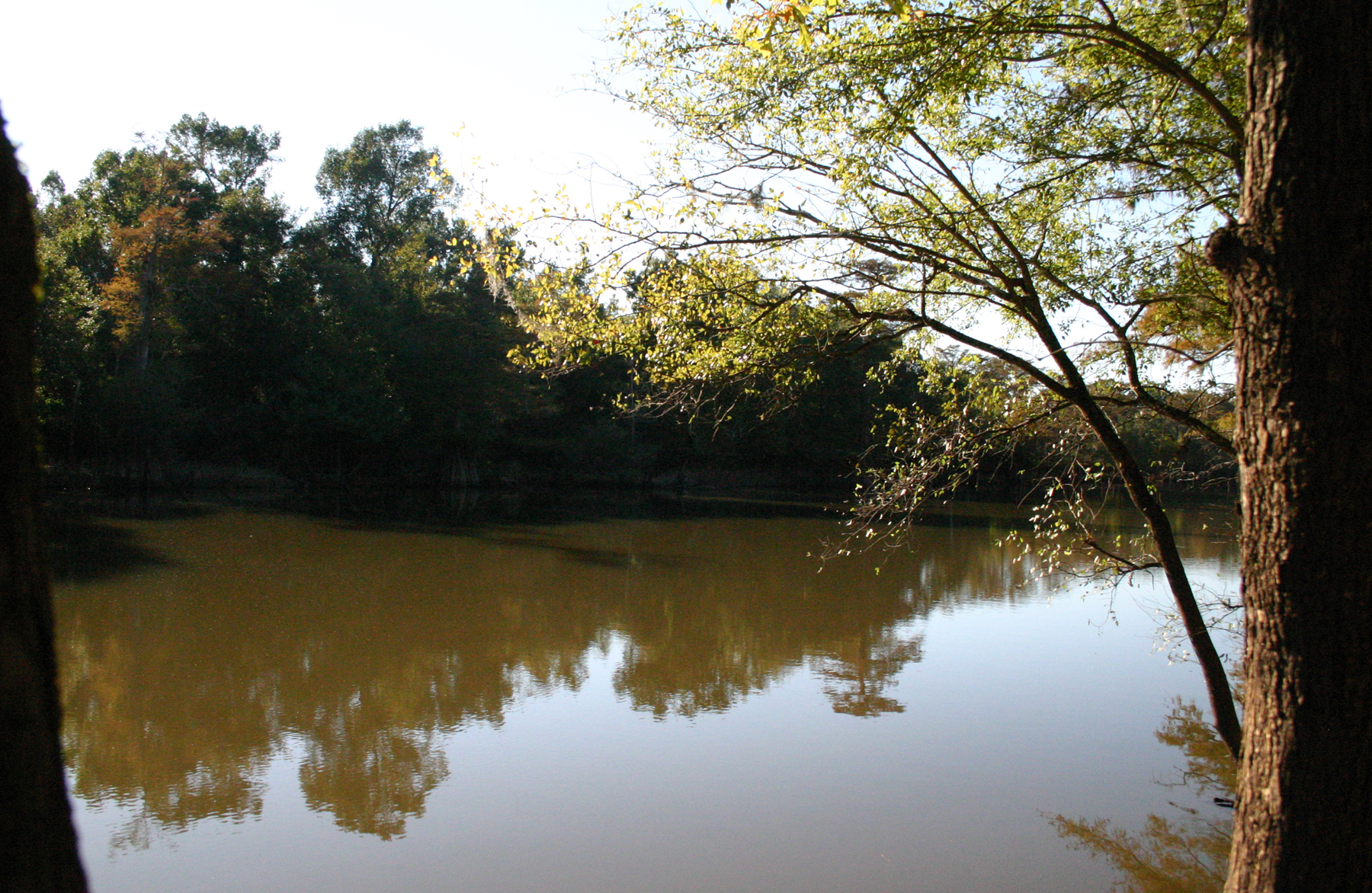
Wee Tee Lake, an oxbow of the Santee River valley, SC.

The river was named by early English settlers for the Santee tribe, which inhabited areas on the middle part of the river. The first European contact was by a Spanish party commanded by Lucas Vázquez de Ayllón in 1526. The early Spaniards may have named the river the Jordan (in honor of the Jordan River).

After suffering a defeat by the English and their allies during the Yamasee War in 1715–1716, the Santee were relocated. Many were shipped as slaves to the West Indies, opening the river for British settlement as part of the Province of Carolina.

During the late 18th century, the upper river was the site of the homestead of Francis Marion, a patriot of the American Revolutionary War. The original site of his homestead has been flooded by the reservoir Lake Marion, which is named in his honor.

Construction of the 22-mile (35 km)-long Santee Canal, linking the river to the Cooper, was begun in 1793 and finished in 1800. It allowed direct water transportation between the upcountry of central South Carolina and the port city Charleston, at the outlet of the Cooper River. The canal operated for 50 years before being made obsolete by the introduction of railroads.

During the Great Depression, the state of South Carolina created the power utility Santee Cooper. The main source of electric power for the utility was a hydroelectric system inland from Charleston, built by the federal government during the administration of President Franklin D. Roosevelt. Starting in 1939, the Santee River was dammed, forming lakes Marion and Moultrie, and diverting the river's flow into the Cooper River through a hydroelectric plant at Pinopolis. The WPA project was completed in 1941.

Though the project succeeded in providing cheap electricity to modernize rural South Carolina, unintended consequences were changes to the character of both the Cooper and Santee rivers below the project. Deprived of most its water flow, the Santee River became more saline and its ecosystem gradually changed below the dam. The Cooper River received more of the freshwater and sediment loads that used to flow into the Santee and carried them downstream. This has resulted in greatly increasing the dredging costs to keep Charleston Harbor operating as a port. During the 1980s, the Army Corps of Engineers built a "rediversion" canal to send most of the water back into the Santee, partially mitigating this problem.

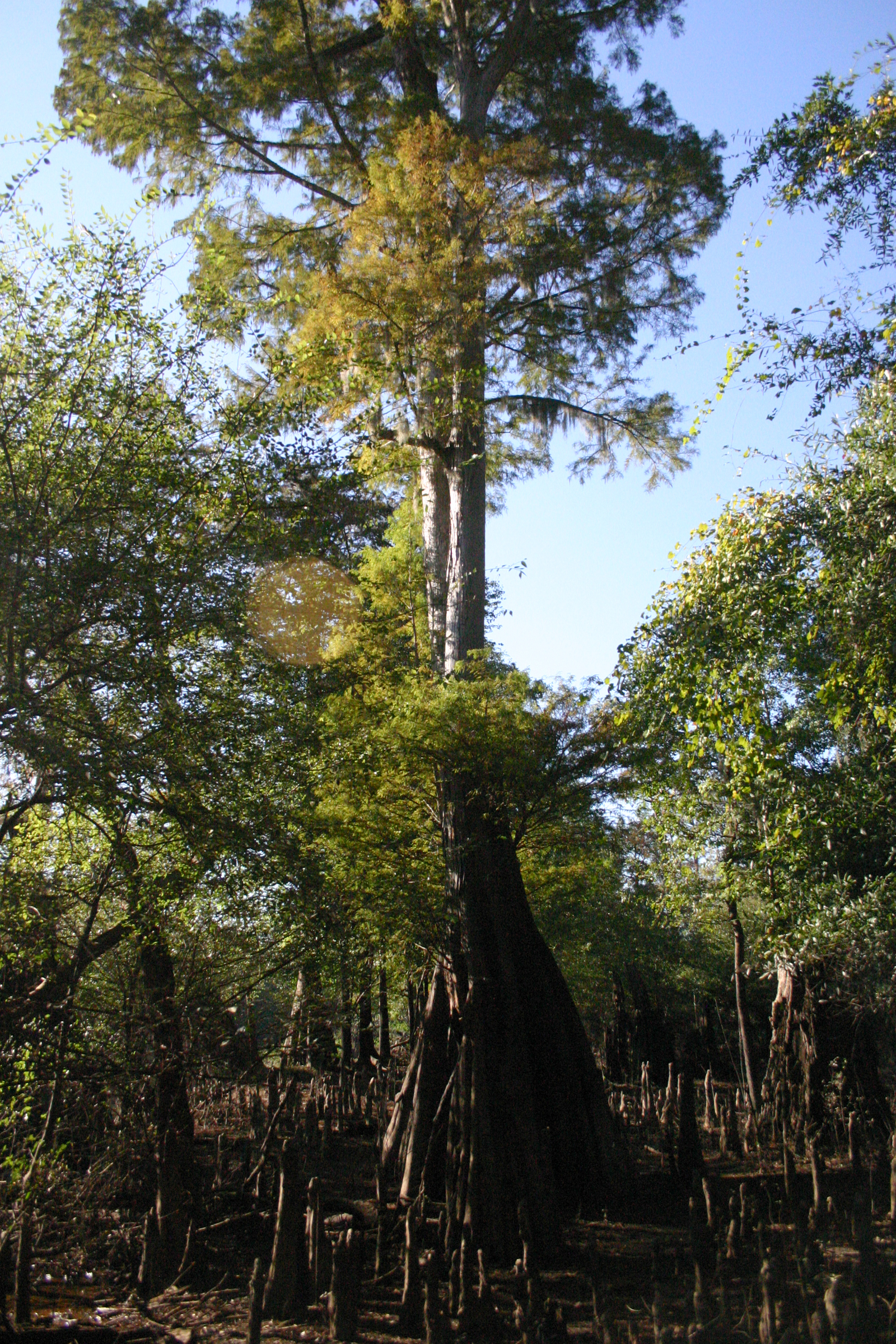
A grand old bald cypress tree in the Santee River valley, near Andrews, South Carolina.

== Crossings ==
This is a partial list of crossings of the Santee River.

- Lake Marion
  - Railroad bridge (CSX Orangeburg Subdivision) between Lone Star and Rimini. (note: This location has been proposed by representative James Clyburn for a new automobile bridge; there is considerable controversy over the project because of its potential environmental effects.)
  - Former US 15 and US 301 bridge at Santee
  - Interstate 95, US 15 and US 301 bridge between Santee and North Santee
- Lower Santee
  - Highway 52 bridge
  - Railroad bridge (CSX Charleston Subdivision) near St. Stephen
  - ALT US 17 bridge and adjacent railroad bridge
  - US 17 bridge (S Fraser Street) over North Santee River and South Santee River

== See also ==
- List of South Carolina rivers
- South Atlantic-Gulf Water Resource Region
