= Congaree River =

River in South Carolina, United States

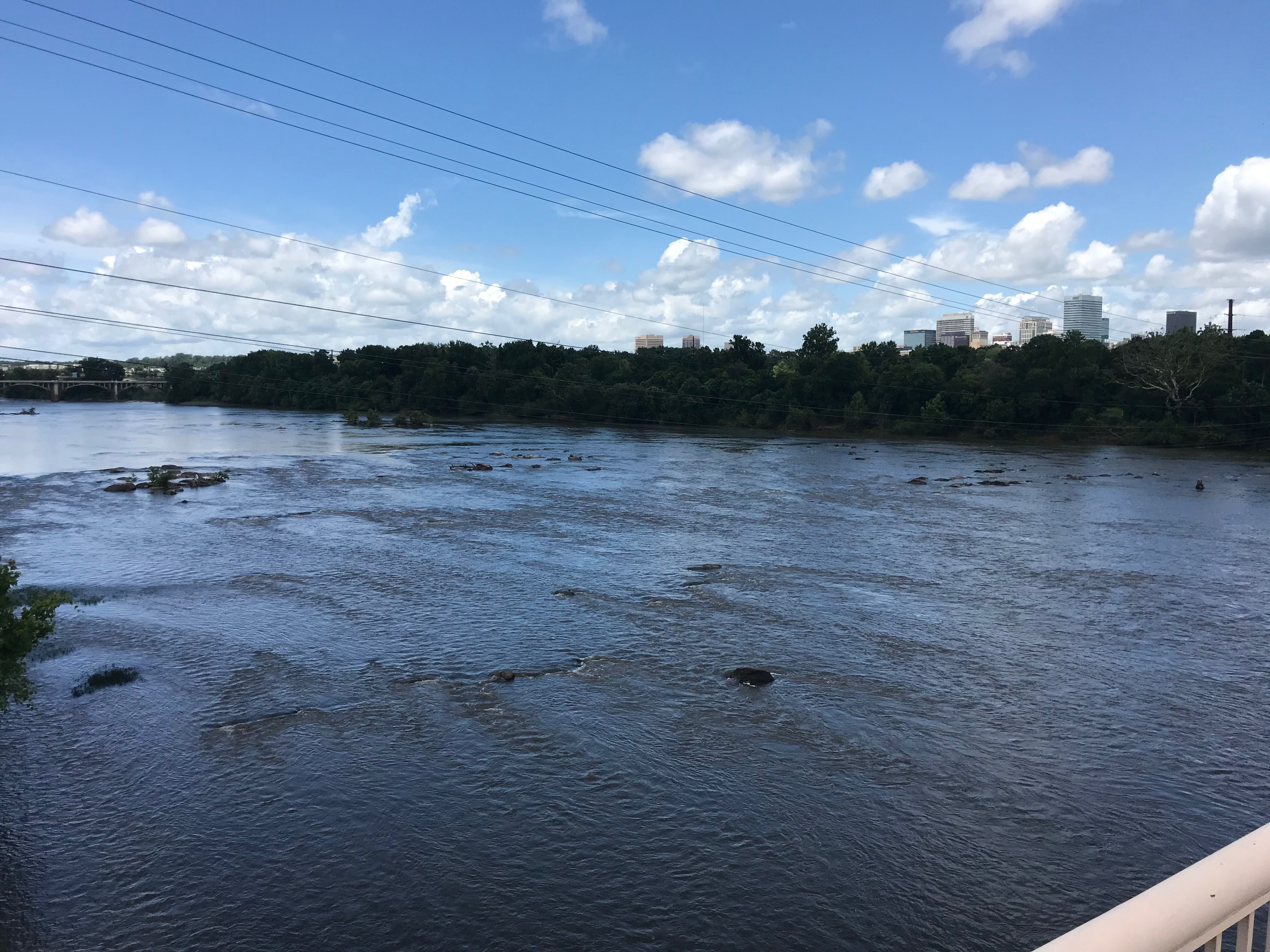
- Congaree River with the Columbia skyline in the background

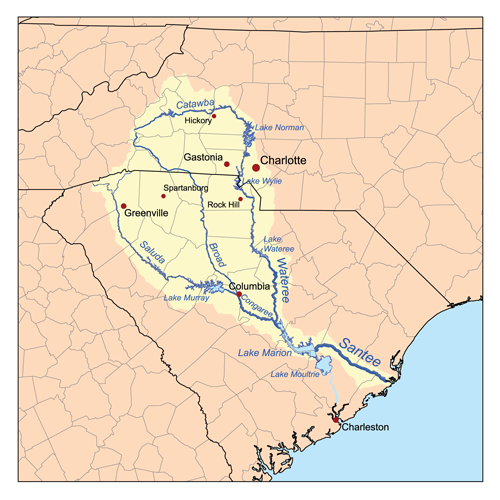
- Map of the Santee River watershed showing the Congaree River

Location
- Country: United States
- State: South Carolina

Physical characteristics
- Source: confluence of Saluda River and Broad River
  - location: Columbia
  - coordinates: 33.994758°N 81.050268°W
- Mouth: Santee River
  - coordinates: 33.694120°N 80.596574°W
- Length: 53 mi (85 km)

Basin features
- Progression: Congaree → Santee → Atlantic Ocean
- River system: Saluda River
- Landmarks: Congaree National Park

The Congaree River is a short but wide river in South Carolina in the United States; It flows for approximately 53 miles (85 km). The river serves an important role as the final outlet channel for the entire Lower Saluda and Lower Broad watersheds, before merging with the Wateree River just north of Lake Marion to form the Santee River.

It is formed in Columbia by the confluence of the Saluda and Broad rivers near the Piedmont Fall Line. It serves as part of the boundary between Richland, Calhoun, and Lexington counties. The only cities near the river are Columbia on the east, and Cayce and West Columbia on the west.

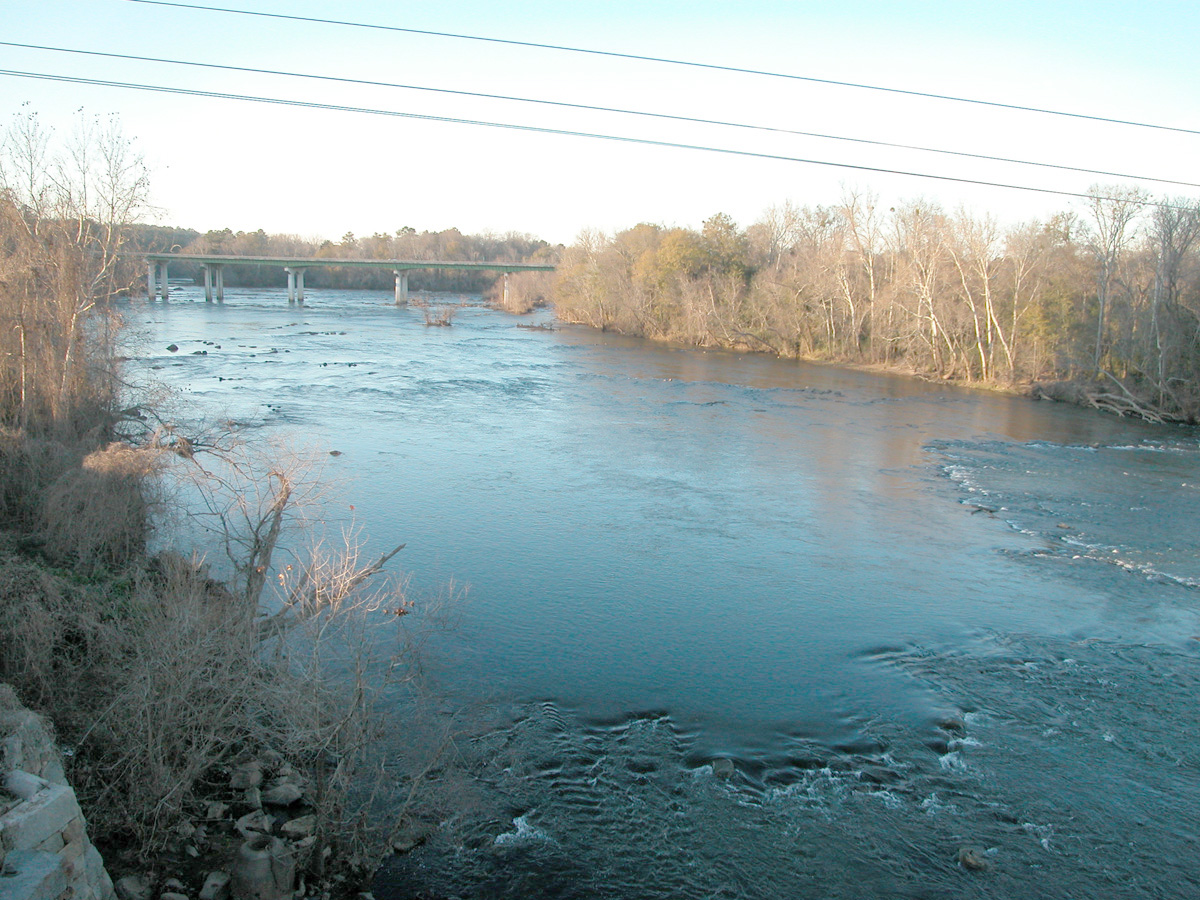
Congaree River in Columbia, South Carolina, looking upstream from the Gervais Street bridge

Despite the vast bottomland swamp below Columbia, the Congaree is navigable along much of its length at high water by barge traffic. This traffic travels upriver from the Port of Charleston (approximately 100 miles (167 km) away through the Santee-Cooper Lakes to within 5 miles (8 km) of the fall line.

The Congaree National Park, one of the main recreational attractions of the river, is located about halfway down the river's course. The 22,200-acre (90 km²) park contains some of the last remaining old growth bottomland hardwood forest in North America. Recreational opportunities include hiking, biking, bird watching, botanical interests, and canoeing.

The river was named for the Congaree Native Americans who used to live along it.

== Crossings ==
Below is a list of crossings from the river's origin in Columbia downstream to its confluence with the Wateree, where it forms the Santee River:

- Columbia/West Columbia/Cayce
  - Jarvis Klapman Blvd (SC 12)
  - Gervais Street Bridge (U.S. 1/U.S. 378)
  - Blossom Street Bridge (U.S. 21/U.S. 321)
  - Granby/Olympia Mills railroad trestles
  - Interstate 77/Southeastern Beltway, Gills Creek forms near the I-77 Bridge
- Eastover
  - Railroad trestle near confluence
  - McCords Ferry Road (U.S. 601), connecting Eastover and Saint Matthews

== See also ==
- List of South Carolina rivers
