= Carolinas–Virginia Tube Reactor =

Decommissioned experimental pressurized water reactor in South Carolina, US

Carolinas-Virginia Tube Reactor
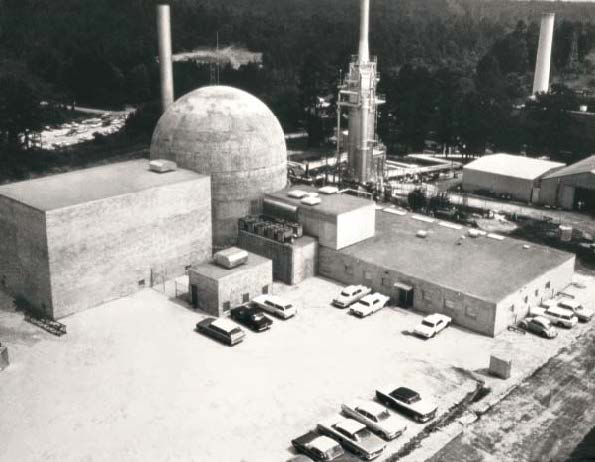
- The Parr Nuclear Plant as it appeared when it was operational during the 1960s.(This is a mirror image of the plant's layout)
- Country: United States
- Location: Fairfield County, near Jenkinsville, South Carolina
- Coordinates: 34°15′45″N 81°19′45″W
- Status: Decommissioned
- Construction began: January 1, 1960
- Commission date: December 18, 1963; 62 years ago
- Decommission date: January 10, 1967; 59 years ago
- Operator: Carolinas Virginia Nuclear Power Associates

Nuclear power station
- Reactor type: PHWR

Power generation
- Units decommissioned: 1 x 17 MW_{e}

External links
- Commons: Related media on Commons

Carolinas–Virginia Tube Reactor (CVTR), also known as Parr Nuclear Station, was an experimental pressurized tube heavy water nuclear power reactor at Parr, South Carolina in Fairfield County. It was built and operated by the Carolinas Virginia Nuclear Power Associates. CVTR was a small test reactor, capable of generating 17 megawatts of electricity. It was officially commissioned in December 1963 and left service in January 1967.

Reactors using heavy water as their moderator have a number of advantages due to their improved neutron economy. This allows them to run on fuels that do not work in conventional light water reactors. CVTR, for instance, used slight enrichment, between 1.5 and 2%, compared to 3 to 5% for conventional designs. This means fuel costs are lower, the tradeoff being higher capital costs due to the need to buy heavy water.

In conceptual terms, CVTR is very similar to the CANDU reactor design that was being pursued by Atomic Energy of Canada Limited around the same time. The two designs differ in some design details and that CANDU can run on natural uranium. CVTR is otherwise similar in most respects, and about the same size and power as the 22 MWe CANDU prototype which entered service in 1962.

== Background ==
=== Light water designs ===
Conventional light water reactors resemble a coal fired power plant in overall design, in that a boiler is used to produce steam which then drives a steam turbine to produce electricity. The boiler is the only significant difference. In a coal plant, this normally consists of a system to burn the coal while water circulates through the boiler in a series of tubes. The water is held under pressure in order to increase its boiling point, which makes the turbines more efficient.

In the case of a nuclear plant, the boiler is replaced with the reactor, which is more complex than a coal boiler for a number of reasons. For one, the water not only acts as the cooling fluid, but also as the neutron moderator, which means its control is vital to the operation of the system as a whole. Additionally, the water tends to pick up radioactivity from the reactor's operation, which leads to safety concerns and maintenance overhead. Finally, steam and liquid water have different moderating qualities, so most (but not all) light water designs keep the water below the boiling point and use a steam generator to feed the turbines.

The major advantage to the light water design concept is that it is simple and similar to existing systems in many ways. It has one major disadvantage, however, which is that the water removes neutrons which lowers the reactor's overall neutron economy. This is enough of an effect that there are not enough neutrons of the right energy to maintain the chain reaction in natural uranium fuel. This requires such designs to use enriched uranium to offset this effect, which increases the price of fuel.

=== Heavy water concept ===
Using natural uranium in a reactor would offer the advantage of lowered fuel costs and better availability as the supply is not dependent on the enrichment cycle. This also offers some protection against nuclear proliferation. In order to do so, the reactor needs to use some other form of moderator that improves the neutron economy. Several such moderators have been suggested, including graphite as in the UK Advanced Gas-cooled Reactor and heavy water.

Of these, heavy water has the major advantage that it is simple to work with. The downside is that it is expensive and a limited resource. This led to the pressurized tube reactor concept, where the pressurized section of the system contains only enough coolant to cool the reactor, the rest of the moderator is placed around it in an unpressurized vessel. In the case of a loss-of-coolant event, only the water in the pressurized system would be lost.

== Design ==
Design of the CVTR began around 1955. CVTR had a thermal output of about 65 MW_{th} and a gross electrical output of 19 MW. Westinghouse Atomic Power Division was responsible for the design of the nuclear systems while Stone and Webster Engineering designed the remainder of the plant.

The reactor consisted of 36 vertical U-tube fuel channels in a moderator tank which was 10 feet in diameter and 16 feet tall. Each leg of the U-tube contained one fuel assembly made up of 19 fuel rods. The reactor used enriched uranium; 12 of the tubes contained fuel enriched to 1.5% U-235 and 24 tubes contained fuel enriched to 2% U-235.

During power operation, heavy water was circulated by primary pumps through the U-tubes containing the fuel assemblies which heated the water. The heated water then flowed through an inverted U-tube steam generator where the heat was transferred to the secondary side light water which turned to steam. The steam flowed to an oil-fired superheater which increased the steam quality before the steam entered the turbine which spun the electrical generator. After passing through the steam generator, the primary loop water was pumped back to the reactor by the primary pumps to repeat the cycle. The primary loop heavy water was pressurized to ensure that the heavy water remained liquid and did not flash to steam at any point in the loop.

The U-shaped pressure tubes containing the fuel were thermally isolated from the hot fuel assembly by two circular thermal baffle tubes around the fuel assembly. This allowed the pressure tubes to operate at low temperatures, essentially that of the moderator tank which was maintained about 155 degrees F and close to atmospheric pressure. The moderator tank contained heavy water which moderated the fission process during operation of the reactor.

The CVTR containment design was a new concept at the time; the general design later became the prevalent design for pressurized water reactor containments in the United States. Designed by Stone and Webster Engineering, the design was focused on not allowing any leakage of radioactive gases or material following an accident. The containment design featured a flat concrete foundation, cylindrical walls, and a hemispherical dome all constructed of reinforced concrete. The entire interior of the containment building was lined with an airtight layer of welded steel plates 1/2" or 1/4" thick, depending on location. From the basement floor to the interior surface of the top of the dome measured 114’-2”. The vertical walls were 2’-0” thick, the cylindrical structure had an interior diameter of 58’-0”, and the dome had a slightly larger interior radius of 29’-4”.

The reactor and facilities were located at Parr, SC just to the northeast of the existing Parr Reservoir hydroelectric dam across the Broad River on a high bluff that overlooks the dam powerhouse.

== Construction ==
The site for the CVTR was approved by the Atomic Energy Commission’s Advisory Committee on Reactor Safeguards in January 1959. Construction started on January 1, 1960.

CVRT was the first US heavy water power reactor.

== Operation ==
CVTR was operated by the Carolinas Virginia Nuclear Power Associates, which was a consortium of the following utilities: Carolina Power & Light Company, Duke Power Company, South Carolina Electric & Gas Company (SCE&G), and Virginia Electric and Power Company

The reactor went critical for the first time on March 30, 1963. CVTR operated successfully from 1963 to 1967. It was shut down after the completion of the planned test program. Staff:

     Harry Ferguson, General Manager (initial); Mayhue Bell (later)
     Walt Selkinghouse, Plant Superintendent
     Paul Barton, Operations Supervisor
     Shift Supervisors: James Wright; Pete Beament; Stan Nabow; J. Ed Smith
     Shift Nuclear Engineers: Sam McManus; Doug Simpson; Larry E. Smith; 
                              Joseph M."Mack" McGough
     Health Physicist: Lionel Lewis
     Construction Supervisor: Bill Thomas
     Engineering Supervisor: Shep Waggoner

More construction pictures from Duke Energy:https://illumination.duke-energy.com/articles/power-plant-from-1960s-gives-gift-to-education-today

== Test facility use ==
Following decommissioning of the CVTR, the facility was used for conducting large scale tests to provide experimental information on the response of containment structures to severe events. In the late 1960s, three tests were conducted in which large volumes of steam from the nearby coal-fired power plant was suddenly released into the CVTR Containment and the response of the plant measured. The results of these experiments were later used for the development and validation of computer model codes.

== Decommissioning ==
The CVTR has been decommissioned and its license was withdrawn. No fuel remains on site. By fall of 2009, demolition was complete and the site was returned to greenfield status.

The much larger and currently operational Virgil C. Summer Nuclear Generating Station was constructed in the 1970s, and began operating in 1984, approximately three miles north of the CVTR.
