= Peak, South Carolina =

- Town
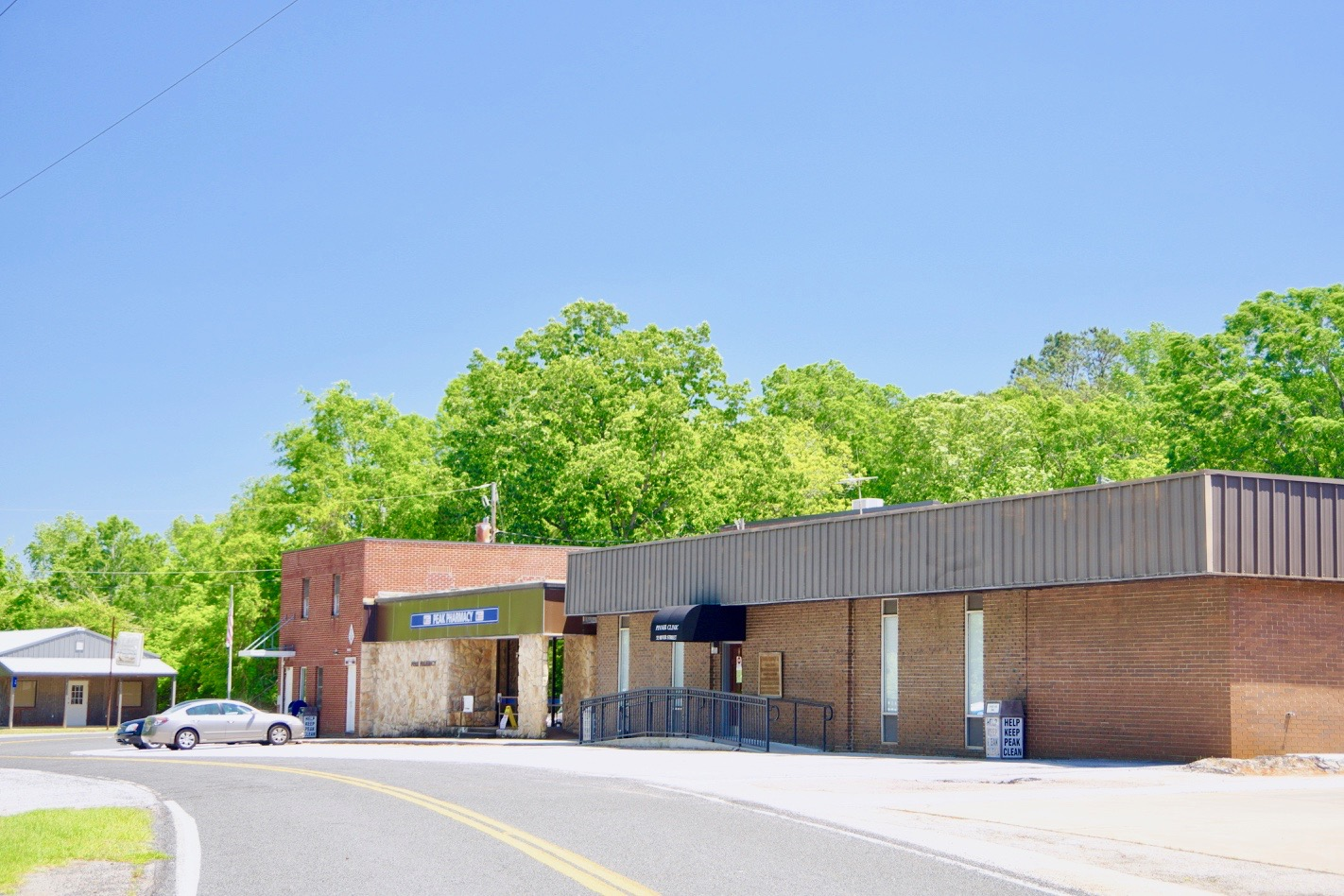
- River Street

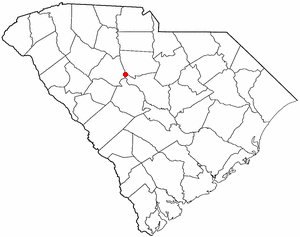
- Location of Peak, South Carolina
- Coordinates: 34°14′11″N 81°19′44″W
- Country: United States
- State: South Carolina
- County: Newberry

Area
  - Total: 0.34 sq mi (0.89 km^{2})
  - Land: 0.34 sq mi (0.89 km^{2})
  - Water: 0 sq mi (0.00 km^{2})
- Elevation: 348 ft (106 m)

Population (2020)
  - Total: 51
  - Density: 148.3/sq mi (57.27/km^{2})
- Time zone: UTC-5 (Eastern (EST))
  - Summer (DST): UTC-4 (EDT)
- ZIP code: 29122
- Area codes: 803, 839
- FIPS code: 45-55150
- GNIS feature ID: 2407086

Peak is a town in Newberry County, South Carolina, United States. The population was 51 at the 2020 census.

== History ==
Peak was established in the early 1850s to house workers building the Greenville and Columbia Railroad. It was named for railroad superintendent, H.T. Peak. The town incorporated in 1880.

== Geography ==
Peak is located along the Broad River, with Parr Reservoir and Monticello Reservoir nearby. South Carolina Highway 213 passes just north of the town, and U.S. Route 176 passes just to the west.

According to the United States Census Bureau, the town has a total area of 0.3 square mile (0.7 km^{2}), all land.

== Demographics ==
Historical population
| Census | Pop. | Note | %± |
|---|---|---|---|
| 1880 | 62 | | — |
| 1890 | 143 | | 130.6% |
| 1900 | 156 | | 9.1% |
| 1910 | 183 | | 17.3% |
| 1920 | 160 | | −12.6% |
| 1930 | 154 | | −3.7% |
| 1940 | 147 | | −4.5% |
| 1950 | 134 | | −8.8% |
| 1960 | 86 | | −35.8% |
| 1970 | 87 | | 1.2% |
| 1980 | 82 | | −5.7% |
| 1990 | 78 | | −4.9% |
| 2000 | 61 | | −21.8% |
| 2010 | 64 | | 4.9% |
| 2020 | 51 | | −20.3% |
U.S. Decennial Census

As of the census of 2000, there were 61 people, 28 households, and 16 families residing in the town. The population density was 226.9 inhabitants per square mile (87.6/km^{2}). There were 36 housing units at an average density of 133.9 per square mile (51.7/km^{2}). The racial makeup of the town was 68.85% White and 31.15% African American. Hispanic or Latino of any race were 1.64% of the population.

There were 28 households, out of which 21.4% had children under the age of 18 living with them, 42.9% were married couples living together, 17.9% had a female householder with no husband present, and 39.3% were non-families. 39.3% of all households were made up of individuals, and 21.4% had someone living alone who was 65 years of age or older. The average household size was 2.18 and the average family size was 2.82.

In the town, the population was spread out, with 18.0% under the age of 18, 4.9% from 18 to 24, 31.1% from 25 to 44, 21.3% from 45 to 64, and 24.6% who were 65 years of age or older. The median age was 43 years. For every 100 females, there were 60.5 males. For every 100 females age 18 and over, there were 56.3 males.

The median income for a household in the town was $27,083, and the median income for a family was $38,750. Males had a median income of $19,688 versus $16,250 for females. The per capita income for the town was $13,033. There were 12.5% of families and 15.6% of the population living below the poverty line, including 27.8% of under eighteens and 20.0% of those over 64.
