= List of lakes of South Carolina =

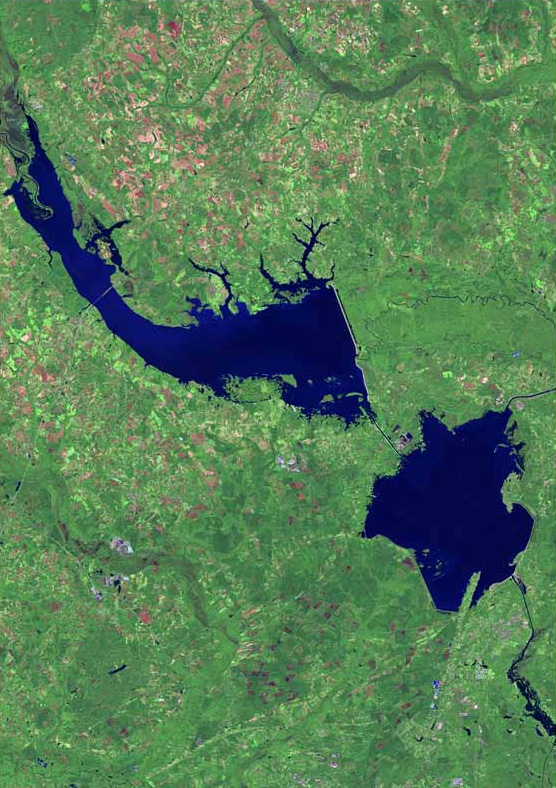
Lake Marion (top) and Lake Moultrie (bottom right) from space

This is a list of lakes and reservoirs in the state of South Carolina in the United States. All major lakes in South Carolina are man-made. Swimming, fishing, and/or boating are permitted in some of these lakes, but not all.

== Lakes in South Carolina ==
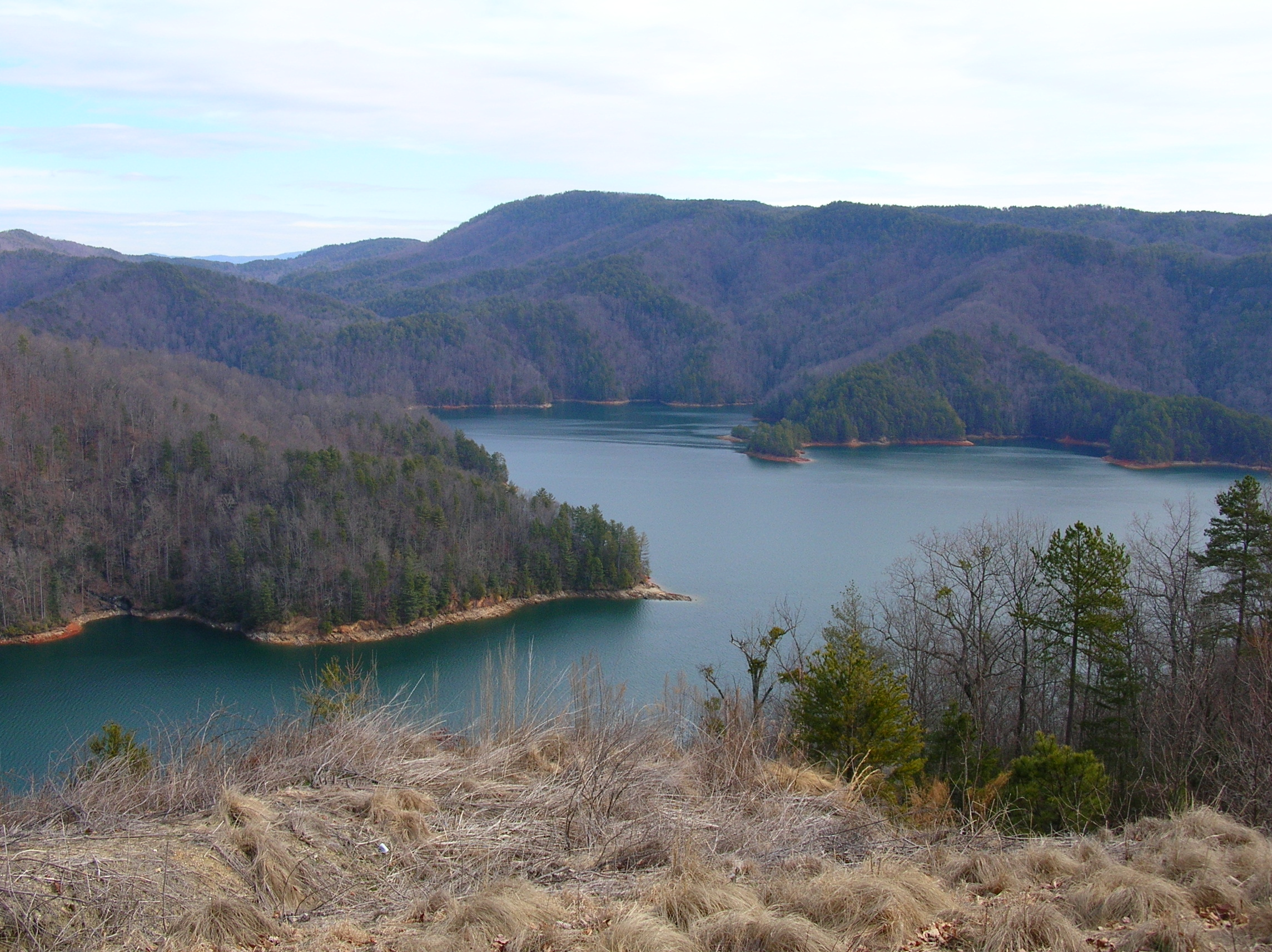
Lake Jocassee from the Bad Creek entrance to the lake

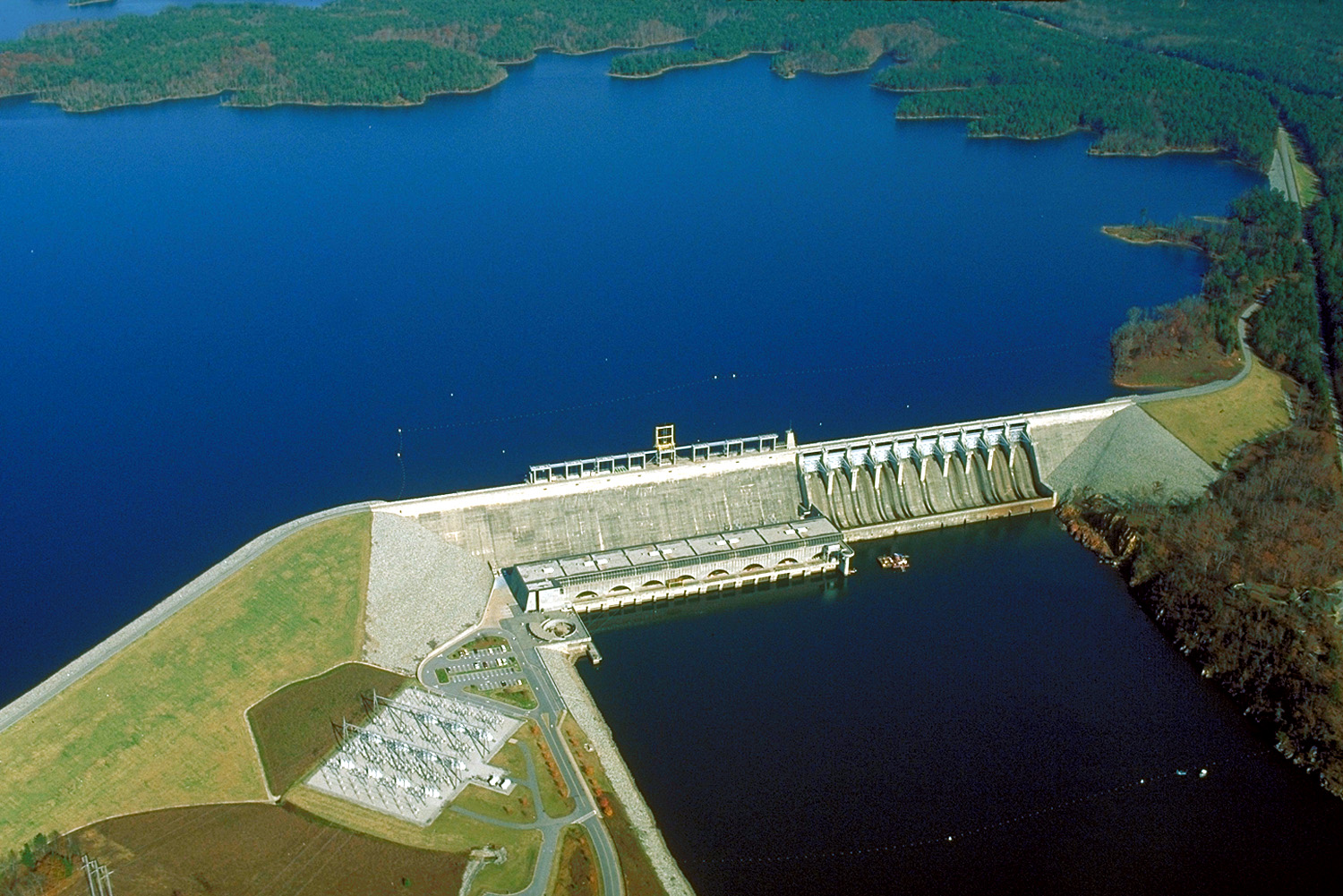
The Richard B. Russell Dam at Richard B. Russell Lake

- Alcohol and Drug Abuse Lake
- Lake Blalock
- Lake Bowen
- Lake Brown
- Lake Greenwood
- Lake Hartwell
- Lake Jocassee
- Lake Keowee
- John D. Long Lake
- Lake Marion
- Monticello Reservoir
- Lake Moultrie
- Lake Murray
- Parr Reservoir
- Pepsi Cola Lake
- Richard B. Russell Lake
- Saluda Lake
- Lake Secession
- Lake Strom Thurmond
- Swan Lake/Iris Gardens
- Lake Tugalo
- Lake Wateree
- Lake Wylie
- Lake Yonah
- Lake Yonder

== See also ==
- List of rivers of South Carolina
