= Lesley Eugene Warren =

American serial killer

- Born: October 15, 1967 (age 59); Candler, North Carolina, U.S.
- Other name: "The Babyface Killer"
- Convictions: North Carolina: First degree murder x2 South Carolina: Murder
- Penalty: North Carolina: Death x2 South Carolina: Life imprisonment

Details
- Victims: 3 (convicted); 4 (confirmed); 8 (confessed)
- Span of crimes: 1987–1990
- Country: United States
- States: New York, South Carolina, North Carolina
- Date apprehended: July 21, 1990
- Imprisoned at: Central Prison, Raleigh, North Carolina

Lesley Eugene Warren (born October 15, 1967), known as The Babyface Killer, is an American serial killer who murdered at least three women in North and South Carolina from 1989 to 1990. Convicted and sentenced to death for the murders in North Carolina, he later confessed to five additional murders, including one in New York, but was never charged with them.

== Early life ==
Lesley Eugene Warren was born on October 15, 1967, in Candler, North Carolina, the older of two sons born to Douglas Eugene Warren and Phyllis West. Reportedly, he began to exhibit signs of antisocial behavior young - as a child, he struggled with establishing emotional connections with the people around him, which worsened after the birth of his brother Laron Ray in 1970.

Following the birth of his second son, Warren's father began to struggle financially and began to physically abuse his family. In 1971, he set fire to the family's trailer, which almost killed his wife and one of the boys. After that incident, Phyllis divorced him and moved in with relatives, taking the children with her. Douglas continued to stalk and harass her, which resulted in Phyllis being awarded full custody of their two children and being granted a restraining order against her ex-husband.

In September 1974, Warren began attending the Emma Elementary School in Candler, where he often clashed with classmates and was repeatedly sent to the school's psychologist. During his school years, he had no interest in learning and did not participate in sports, which made him unpopular among his peers. By 1981, Warren started attending Erwin High School - shortly afterwards, he began arguing with his mother, further impacting his academic performance. After having several conversations with the teenager, the school psychologist suggested that Warren undergo psychotherapy.

By the end of 1981, his mental condition was deteriorating rapidly. At around the same time, Warren began spending much of his free time with petty criminals, soon engaging in burglaries, doing drugs, and threatening peers with physical violence. In January 1982, he was arrested for vandalism and expelled from school, whereupon he was placed in the Broughton Hospital for a psychological evaluation. Based on the results of the evaluation, Warren was diagnosed with conduct disorder and schizoid personality disorder and was prescribed treatment, which supposedly improved his mental health. He was soon discharged and enrolled at Enka High School in September 1982, but was expelled 33 days later because he failed to attend for 20 school days. In early October, his mother discovered marijuana in his room, and after arguing about it, Warren was thrown out of the house for the night.

=== Assault on Betty Pressley ===
On the following day, Warren returned to his mother's house, and while she was away, he abducted the next-door neighbor Betty Pressley and dragged her to the basement, where he tied her up. At that point, Pressley's friend showed up to the house, but as he was unable to find her, he went around searching until he found her in the basement. A struggle ensued between him and Warren, in which the latter shot the former with a revolver and then fled the scene. The injury proved to be non-fatal, allowing the friend to free Pressley from her restraints and call the police.

Warren was arrested for this crime on October 4, 1982. He admitted responsibility during questioning, and was then placed in the Buncombe County Detention Center to await trial. Just a month after his arrest, he attempted to hang himself in his cell but failed, after which Warren was placed in a psychiatric hospital to undergo treatment. After his mental health improved, he was convicted of kidnapping Pressley and the attempted murder of her friend, but as a juvenile, he received a minor sentence and was sent to the Juvenile Evaluation Center, where he remained until October 1985.

Upon his release, Warren returned to Candler, where he resided with his mother. On April 4, 1986, he enlisted in the United States Army and was stationed at Fort Benning, Georgia, where he soon attained the rank of Specialist. While there, he married a girl named Tracy Bradshaw, and they had two sons. In late 1986, Warren was assigned to the 10th Mountain Division, after which he was transferred to Fort Drum in New York.

== Murders ==
=== Patsy Vineyard ===
On May 15, 1987, Warren murdered the wife of one of his colleagues at Fort Drum, 20-year-old Patsy Diane Vineyard. In mid-May, Michael Vineyard, the colleague, was sent away to partake in a field maneuvers exercise, after which Warren began an affair with Patsy. On May 15, while on a date together and using drugs, he raped and strangled her, after which he threw the corpse into the Black River near Sackets Harbor. Her body was found floating in Lake Ontario a month later.

On February 25, 1988, Warren was apprehended by a military unit for going AWOL, for which he was incarcerated for 75 days and demoted to PFC. On April 28, he was ordered to continue military service at Fort Benjamin Harrison, Indiana, but upon learning of this, Warren left and instead went to New York City, where he spent the summer living in homeless shelters and became addicted to drugs.

On June 17, Warren was dishonorably discharged from the Army and labeled a deserter. At the end of the month, he left New York for Philadelphia, Pennsylvania, where he was arrested on vagrancy charges. After serving a sentence at the local jail, he moved with his wife and child to Spartanburg, South Carolina in the fall of 1988. Warren soon began frequently arguing with his wife due to his drug addiction, which soon caused him to abandon them and return to Candler. Once there, he found work as a cashier at a store near his mother's house and enrolled in a 3-month training program for truck drivers. He was described as living a punk lifestyle and liked to listen to acid rock.

=== Carolina murders ===
On March 10, 1989, Warren completed the training program and took on a job as a driver for Am-Can, a trucking company based in Anderson, South Carolina. That summer he briefly reunited with his wife before she returned to Spartanburg. She later revealed to him that she was pregnant with their second child, and that she intended to file for divorce so she could receive child support.

On August 26, Warren came across 42-year-old Velma Faye Gray, who had just suffered a traffic accident on the road five miles away from her hometown, Travelers Rest. Under the pretense of helping her, he lured her into his truck and drove to a nearby wooded area where he beat and strangled her to death. After this, he threw her body into Lake Bowen, where it was later found by two fishermen. Her car was later found in Greenville County, but it was determined to be stolen by an individual unconnected to Gray's murder.

On December 25, he met 39-year-old Jayme Denise Hurley, a counselor at the Juvenile Evaluation Center in Swannanoa, and they began dating. Warren eventually assaulted and strangled Hurley to death. On the following day, he confessed this act to his brother Laron, who helped him bury the body in a snake-infested pit located within the Pisgah National Forest. Two days later, Hurley's father contacted the police about his daughter's disappearance and told them that her boyfriend Warren was the last person to see her alive. On May 28, Warren was taken into custody, but denied any involvement with her disappearance. Police eventually found her purse in his car, but as the body had not been found yet, he was only charged with misdemeanor larceny and failure to produce a title to a motor vehicle.

On June 6, Warren's grandfather paid his $1,000 bail and he was released pending trial. During this time, he confessed to his wife that he had murdered Hurley, and to his mother that he had murdered Vineyard. Two days later, his mother called the police and relayed what her son had told her, at which point he was declared the prime suspect in the killing. The trial for the theft of Hurley's purse began on July 10, 1990, but on the following day, Warren stole a black-gray Kawasaki motorcycle and fled across the state.

On July 13, he met cocktail waitress Teri Quinby in High Point, where he was staying at the Radisson Hotel. He was previously acquainted with her, as he had played with her brother for a local amateur softball team and had been to their house. Two days later, he was invited to a picnic attended by Quinby, her children and friends. While there, he met a friend of Quinby's, 21-year-old Katherine Noel Johnson, a part-time student at the University of North Carolina. After drinking alcohol together, Warren and Johnson went for a ride on his motorcycle. On the afternoon of July 16, he brought her to an abandoned soccer field where he raped and strangled her with her own bra. He then placed Johnson's body inside her car, parked it in the garage, and then fled on foot. The body was soon discovered by the staff, who immediately contacted the police.

== Arrest ==
On July 7, a press conference was held in which Warren was announced a suspect in at least four murders. Soon after this, police were contacted by Warren's brother, who admitted to helping Warren dispose of Hurley's corpse and showed them where it was buried. In the meantime, Warren himself was arrested without incident on July 21 at Quinby's house.

Following his arrest, he admitted responsibility for the murders and openly cooperated with the authorities. He also said that in addition to these four, he was responsible for another four murders that he had not been connected to. According to him, in August 1988, he killed a Hispanic girl named Mary and buried her body in a peach orchard in Campobello, South Carolina. In the summer of 1989, he allegedly picked up a male hitchhiker named Ronald, killed him, and then buried his body in Tennessee. The two other murders supposedly occurred in 1989 in Asheville, when he killed two men during a drug deal. When asked about the Hurley murder, Warren insisted that he did not intend to kill her and that she died of an accidental drug overdose.

== Trials and sentences ==
Following his arrest, Warren was charged with the four murders to which he had been conclusively linked. In late 1990, a number of high-ranking law enforcement officials from North Carolina, South Carolina and New York met to plan a strategy for prosecuting Warren, with the final decision being that he would first be extradited to South Carolina to face charges for the murder of Velma Gray, and then to North Carolina for the remaining murders.

On August 23, 1991, Warren was extradited to South Carolina. At the request of his attorneys, he underwent a psychiatric evaluation, which ruled him sane in April 1992. His trial began on April 13, 1993, and only lasted two days, as he pleaded guilty and was subsequently sentenced to life imprisonment. Afterwards, he was extradited to North Carolina, where he stood trial on early 1995 for the murder of Hurley. Based on the incriminating evidence and his own confession, Warren was found guilty on all counts and was sentenced to death on October 6, 1995. After the trial ended, the Deputy District Attorney from New York stated that while he remained the prime suspect in the murder of Vineyard, he would not be tried due to his death sentence in North Carolina.

In early 1996, Warren was put on trial for the murder of Katherine Johnson. He was found guilty in late March, and after deliberating for 75 minutes, the jury recommended that he be sentenced to death again. During sentencing, Warren retained his composure and showed no emotion.

== Appeals and current status ==
After his conviction, Warren was transferred to North Carolina's death row in Central Prison, Raleigh. In cooperation with his attorneys, he filed an appeal to overturn his death sentence, but it was denied in 1998. In 2009, he was among the 147 inmates who filed petitions under the newly imposed Racial Justice Act, claiming that the sentence was unjust as he was more likely to be sentenced to death due to the fact that his victims were white. His petition was ultimately denied, as the appellate court found that he had received a fair trial and there was no presence of racial bias that could have affected his sentencing.

In 2014, his case was covered on an episode of the true crime documentary Handsome Devils, on Investigation Discovery.

As of February 2025, Warren remains on death row and awaits execution, as he has completely exhausted his appeals.

== See also ==
- Capital punishment in North Carolina
- List of death row inmates in the United States § North Carolina
- List of serial killers in the United States

== Bibliography ==
- Wensley Clarkson (January 1, 2004). Romeo Killer. Blake Publishing. ISBN 1844540413.
