= Pepsi Cola Lake =

Lake in Florence County, South Carolina

- Location within South Carolina
- Location: Florence County, South Carolina
- Coordinates: 34°8′51.5″N 79°36′24.5″W
- Type: lake

Pepsi Cola Lake is a lake in Florence County, South Carolina, in the United States.

The lake was likely so named on account of its dark water, according to local history.

== See also ==
- List of lakes in South Carolina
