= Santee Cooper =

South Carolina's state-owned electric and water utility

Santee Cooper or South Carolina Public Service Authority
- Company type: Public Power Utility
- Industry: Electric and Water Utility
- Founded: 1934
- Headquarters: Moncks Corner, SC
- Website: www.santeecooper.com

Santee Cooper, also known officially from the 1930s as the South Carolina Public Service Authority, is South Carolina's state-owned electric and water utility that came into being during the New Deal as both a rural electrification and public works project that created two lakes and cleared large tracts of land while building hydro-electric dams and power plants. Its headquarters are located in Moncks Corner, South Carolina.

As one of the largest power providers in South Carolina, Santee Cooper directly serves more than 165,000 residential and commercial customers in Berkeley, Georgetown, and Horry counties. With a fuel and energy supply that includes coal, nuclear, oil, natural gas, hydroelectric, and other renewable sources, Santee Cooper supplies power to the cities of Bamberg and Georgetown, 30 large industrial customers, and Charleston Air Force Base. Santee Cooper generates the power distributed by some of South Carolina's electric cooperatives. Following the Nukegate scandal, the South Carolina General Assembly debated whether to privatize or reform Santee Cooper, ultimately passing a reform bill that overhauled the regulation and oversight of the state-owned utility.

== Management ==
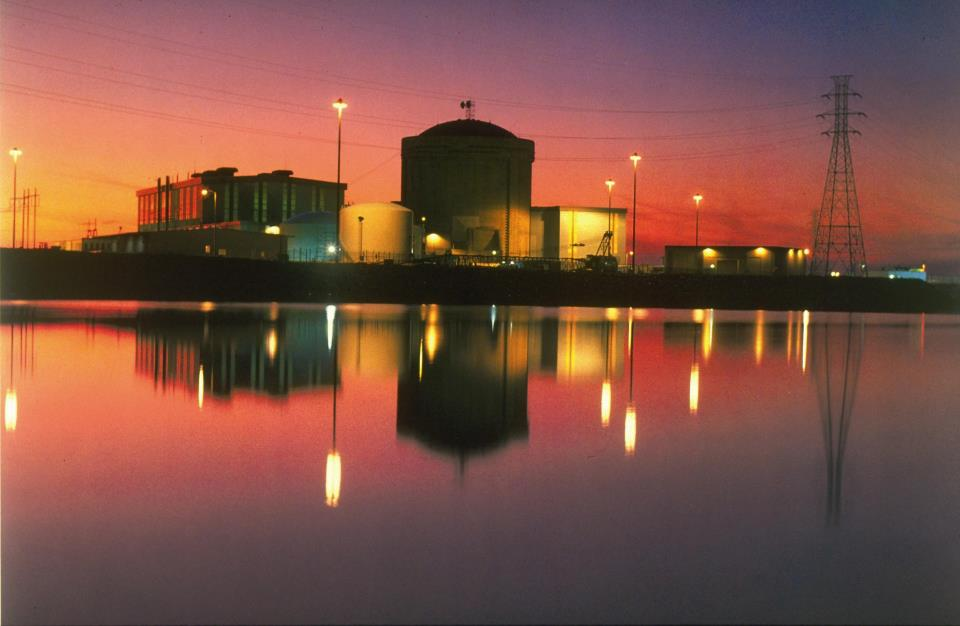

A board of directors appointed by the governor and approved by the state Senate governs Santee Cooper. A board member represents each congressional district and each of the three counties where Santee Cooper serves retail customers directly; two board member have previous electric cooperative experience; and the chairman is appointed at-large.

In September 2017, then-CEO Lonnie Carter announced his retirement following the decision to abandon construction of two new AP1000 nuclear reactors at the Virgil C. Summer Nuclear Generating Station, leaving Santee Cooper with debts of about $4.4 billion for the partial construction. For his leadership and vision, Carter is projected to receive over $800,000 a year in retirement. Following the failure, the predominant issue facing the South Carolina General Assembly from 2018 until the COVID-19 pandemic in 2020 was whether to sell Santee Cooper or to reform the utility's management. The sale of the utility is favored by Governor McMaster. He called Santee Cooper a "rogue agency" due to its independence and financial problems. NextEra Energy, a Florida-based electric utility, bid to purchase Santee Cooper but withdrew in April 2021. In June 2021, the South Carolina General Assembly passed Act 90, overhauling the regulation of the utility but maintaining its state-owned status. The bill passed unanimously, making it veto-proof.

== Post V.C. Summer Reform ==
Act 90 of 2021, effective after January 1, 2022, brings Santee Cooper under the purview of the South Carolina Public Service Commission, the regulatory agency that oversees public utilities in the state. This oversight includes integrated resource planning, service territory changes, facility siting and acquisition, purchase power agreements, and competitive procurement of renewable resources. Rates will continue to be set by the Santee Cooper Board of Directors but are subject to increased scrutiny.

The reform will oust all but one of the ten members of the Board of Directors by 2025. It reduces the elected term of a Board Member to four years and places a three-term limit, as well as restrictions on severance packages for exiting members. The board selection process remains the same.

== Santee Cooper Lakes ==
The Santee Cooper Power and Navigation Project, constructed in 1939, improved navigation on and provided hydroelectric power from the Santee and Cooper rivers in South Carolina. With the creation of Lake Marion and Lake Moultrie, the project was intended to improve the health, recreation, and economy of the area. At the time, the Santee Cooper Project was the largest land-clearing project in U.S. history, with over 12,500 workers clearing over 177,000 acres (720 km^{2}) of swamp and forestland. 42 miles (68 km) of dams and dikes were constructed, including a 26-mile (42 km), 78-foot (24 m) tall earthen dike. The Pinopolis Dam included the hydroelectric station and navigation lock, the highest single-lift lock in the world. A 3,400-foot (1,000 m) spillway was built to control floodwaters, with 62 gates allowing overflow of excess water. In completing the largest earth-moving project in the nation's history, 42,000,000 cubic yards (32,000,000 m^{3}) of earth were moved and 3.1 million cubic yards of concrete were poured.

The project also caused substantial hardship to local landowners. The formerly-saline Cooper river became fresh, and the formerly-fresh Santee river became saline, disrupting the local ecological communities.

The $48.2 million project (55 percent federal loan, 45 percent federal grant) first generated electricity on February 17, 1942. As transmission lines were built, power flowed to customers in Berkeley, Georgetown and Horry counties, and ultimately to electric cooperatives serving customers in 46 counties.

== Projects and power plants ==
=== Power plants ===
List of Power Plants
Name	Location	Capacity (MW)	Fuel type	Annual Generation (GWh)	CO_{2} emissions (Tons/year)	Retirement	Ref
Colleton		3	Solar	4 (2019)	N/A		
Cross	33°22′9″N 80°6′51″W	2,390	Refined coal	8,375 (2019)	8,960,208 (2018)		
Rainey	34°20′52″N 82°46′28″W	1,102	Natural gas	5,582 (2019)	2,261,698 (2018)		
Winyah		1,260	Refined coal	1,583 (2019)	1,582,699 (2018)	2028	

In addition to the plants listed above, Santee Cooper has 28 MW of Landfill gas generation and 74 MW of wood biomass generation. Santee Cooper has 800 MW of renewable energy generation online or under contract. Santee Cooper owns one-third of the V.C. Summer Nuclear Station operated by Dominion Energy South Carolina, which owns the remaining two-thirds.

=== Johns Island Transmission Project ===
Since 2017, Santee Cooper has partnered with Dominion Energy to construct the Johns Island-Queensboro 115kV Transmission project on Johns Island, South Carolina. The 5.1 mile-long transmission line will be the island's second line and has received the requisite approvals from the relevant state agencies as well as the United States Army Corps of Engineers. It will traverse 2.2 miles of preexisting right of way. The utilities will need to acquire approximately 2.9 miles of new right of way. Parts of the line will run through a number of wetlands, including Simmons Creek and Murray Creek. Residents of surrounding neighborhoods have raised concerns about the line's environmental impacts. It is estimated that it would have cost approximately $30 million to bury the line.
