= Lake Brown (South Carolina) =

- Edgar Brown Lake
- Location within South Carolina
- Location: Barnwell County, South Carolina
- Coordinates: 33°15′18″N 81°22′01″W
- Type: lake
- Basin countries: United States
- Surface area: 100-acre (0.40 km^{2}; 0.16 sq mi)
- Surface elevation: 174 ft (53 m)

Lake Brown, officially known as Edgar Brown Lake, is a 100-acre (0.40 km^{2}; 0.16 sq mi) fishing lake located in Barnwell County, South Carolina.

== See also ==
- List of lakes in South Carolina
