= Alcohol and Drug Abuse Lake =

Reservoir in South Carolina, United States

Village Lake
- Alcohol and Drug Abuse Lake, Morris Village Pond
- Location within South Carolina Location within the United States
- Location: Richland County, South Carolina
- Coordinates: 34°05′31″N 80°59′17″W
- Type: Reservoir
- River sources: Crane Creek River
- Built: 1973
- Surface area: 93.2 acres (377,000 m^{2})
- Surface elevation: 318 feet (97 m)

Alcohol and Drug Abuse Lake, now known as Village Lake, is a reservoir in Richland County, South Carolina, United States. Construction of the reservoir was finished in 1973. The 93.2-acre (377,000 m^{2}) lake is on a tributary of the Crane Creek River. The small body of water is notable almost exclusively due to its former name.

== History ==
The reservoir was built in 1973 along the tributary of the Crane Creek River. Its previous name, Alcohol and Drug Abuse Lake, was first published in the U.S. Army Corps of Engineers' Dams and Reservoirs List in October 1981.

The lake was named after a place called Morris Village Alcohol and Drug Addiction Treatment Center, a nearby inpatient hospital for people with substance use disorders. Before 2022, its owner, the South Carolina Department of Mental Health, used the name "the pond at Morris Village", sometimes "Morris Village Pond" or the "Village Lake". On June 9, 2022, the lake was officially renamed to Village Lake by the U.S. Board on Geographic Names (BGN).

== See also ==
- List of lakes in South Carolina
- Place names considered unusual
