= Lake Blalock =

- Location within South Carolina
- Location: Spartanburg County, South Carolina
- Coordinates: 35°04′30″N 81°52′43″W
- Type: reservoir
- Primary inflows: Pacolet River, Casey Creek, Buck Creek
- Primary outflows: Pacolet River
- Basin countries: United States
- Surface area: 1,105 acres (447 ha)
- Max. depth: 21 ft (6.4 m)
- Surface elevation: 216.4 m (710 ft)

Lake Blalock (formally, the H. Taylor Blalock Reservoir) is a reservoir in Spartanburg County, South Carolina, located on the Pacolet River about five miles north of Spartanburg. After its creation was authorized in 1976 by the Commissioners of Spartanburg Water System, Blalock Dam was constructed in 1983. The existing earthen dam is approximately 700 ft (210 m). long and 70 ft (21 m) high. It was originally designed for a normal operating pool of 700 feet (210 m), and the lake had approximately 35 miles (56 km) of shoreline. The existing spillway has a crest length of 270 ft (82 m).

To increase the safe yield of the reservoir, Spartanburg Water System raised the level of Lake Blalock by 10 feet (3.0 m), increasing the water surface elevation to 710 feet (220 m) in 2004. This project was completed in 2006 and involved overlaying the existing earthen dam with a layer of roller compacted concrete, approximately 3 ft (0.91 m) in thickness, and constructing a new RCC stilling basin. The existing spillway was also upgraded by furnishing and installing three hydraulically operated spillway crest gates, constructing a new cast-in-place concrete ogee crest, and constructing a bridge across the spillway. In addition, the project also cleared approximately 300 acres (120 ha) (42 miles (68 km) of shoreline) around the perimeter of the reservoir.

== See also ==
- List of lakes in South Carolina
