= Virgil C. Summer Nuclear Generating Station =

Nuclear power plant located near Jenkinsville, South Carolina

Virgil C. Summer Nuclear Power Station
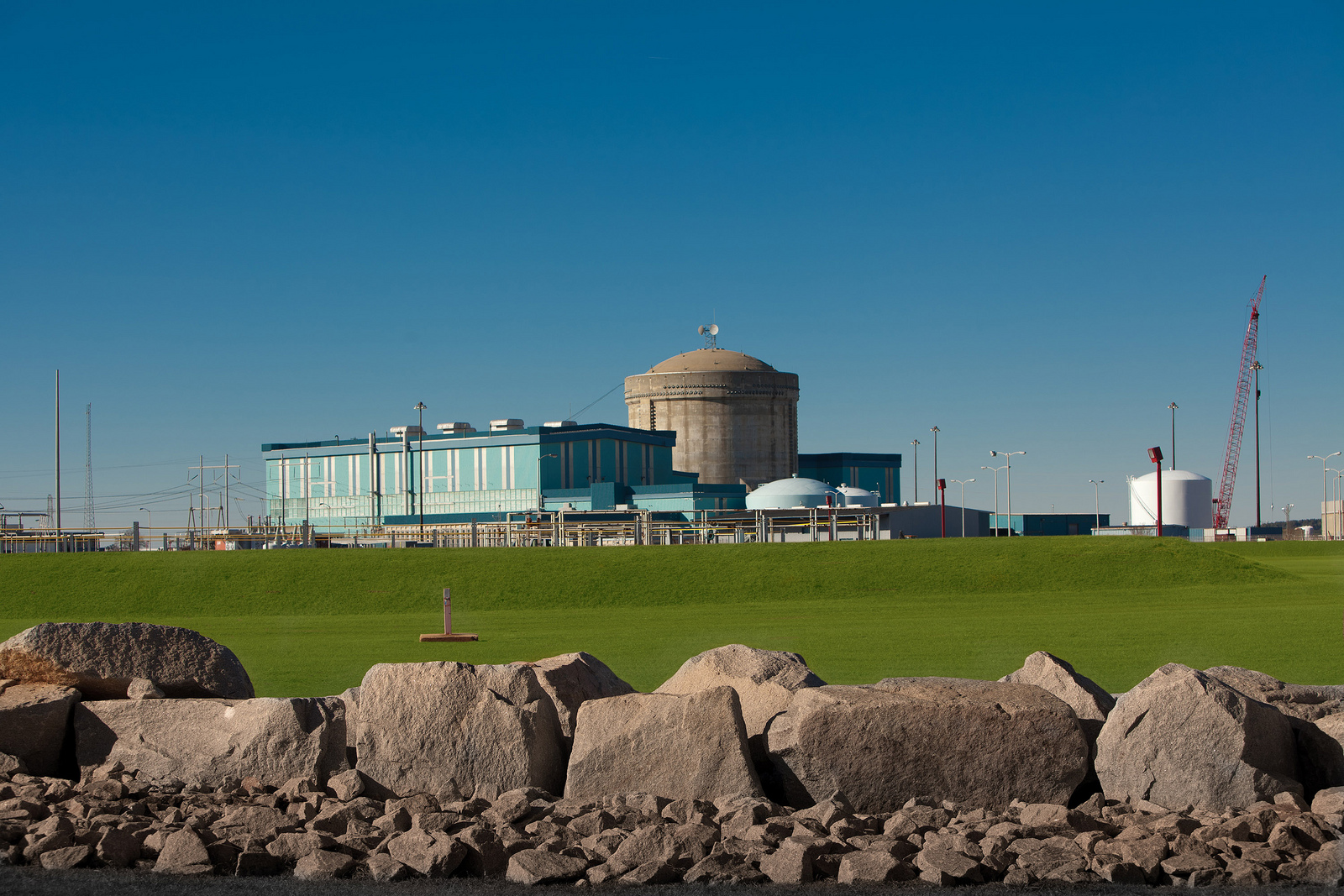
- Virgil C. Summer Nuclear Station Unit 1
- Country: United States
- Location: Fairfield County, South Carolina
- Coordinates: 34°17′55″N 81°18′53″W
- Status: Operational
- Construction began: Unit 1: March 21, 1973; Unit 2: March 9, 2013; Unit 3: November 2, 2013
- Commission date: Unit 1: January 1, 1984 (42 years ago)
- Construction cost: $2.563 billion (2007 USD, Unit 1) ($3.72 billion in 2024 dollars)
- Owners: Dominion Energy South Carolina (two-thirds); South Carolina Public Service Authority (one-third)
- Operator: Dominion Energy South Carolina
- Employees: 500

Nuclear power station
- Reactor type: PWR
- Reactor supplier: Westinghouse
- Cooling towers: 4 × Mechanical Draft (intended for Units 2–3)
- Cooling source: Monticello Reservoir
- Thermal capacity: 1 × 2900 MW_{th}

Power generation
- Units operational: 1 × 973 MW
- Make and model: WH 3-loop (DRYAMB)
- Units cancelled: 2 × 1117 MW AP1000
- Nameplate capacity: 973 MW
- Capacity factor: 81.11% (2017); 83.9% (lifetime)
- Annual net output: 6552 GWh (2021)

External links
- Website: www.sceg.com
- Commons: Related media on Commons

The Virgil C. Summer Nuclear Power Station occupies a site near Jenkinsville, South Carolina, in Fairfield County, South Carolina, approximately 20 miles (32 km) northwest of Columbia.

The plant has one Westinghouse 3-loop Pressurized Water Reactor, which has received approval of a 20-year license extension, taking the license expiration of Unit 1 from 2022 to 2042. Its cooling water is supplied by the Monticello Reservoir, which is also used by a pumped storage (hydroelectric) unit. The plant utilizes a once-through cooling system.

The owners, South Carolina Electric and Gas and South Carolina Public Service Authority, were in the process of constructing two new AP1000 reactors on the site, which had been scheduled to go into service in 2020, but due to cost overruns which forced the construction contractor, Westinghouse, into bankruptcy in what was referred to as the Nukegate scandal, construction on these was abandoned in 2017.

The nuclear power station also includes the decommissioned experimental Carolinas-Virginia Tube Reactor (CVTR) unit, just outside the site of the old town of Parr, SC. The CVTR was a 17 MWe, heavy water reactor.

The plant is named after Virgil Clifton Summer, the former chairman and CEO of SCE&G.

In August 2023, Dominion Energy applied for another 20-year license extension for Unit 1 until August 7, 2062, which was granted by the Nuclear Regulatory Commission on June 30, 2025.

== Unit 1 ==
V. C. Summer Unit 1 is a Westinghouse 3-loop Pressurized Water Reactor. The reactor first began commercial operation on January 1, 1984. The plant cost $1.3 billion to construct (equivalent to $4 billion in 2025)– 24 percent less per kilowatt than the average of 13 nuclear plants constructed over the same time period.

Unit 1 generates 2900 MW_{th} (Thermal Megawatts) of heat, supplying a net output of 966 MW_{e} (Electric Megawatts) of electricity to the grid.

In 2001, the Summer unit operated at 79.9 percent capacity, producing 6.76 billion kilowatt-hours of electricity. In 2007 it produced 8.48 billion kilowatt-hours, increasing its capacity factor to 100.2 percent.

Two-thirds of the Summer plant is owned by its operator, Dominion Energy. The remaining one-third is owned by the South Carolina Public Service Authority (Santee Cooper).

== Units 2 and 3 ==
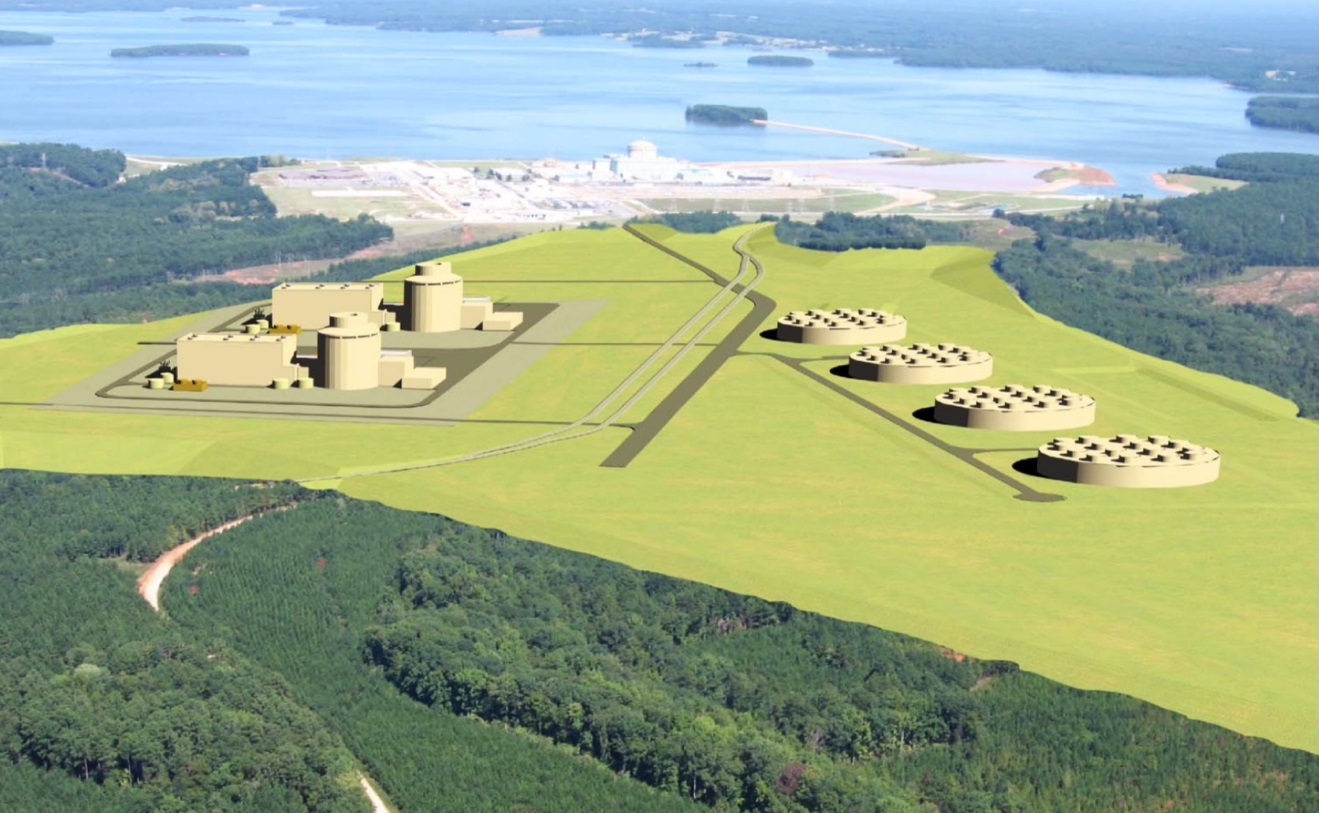
Artist’s view of the new AP1000 units, adjacent to existing nuclear facility.

On March 27, 2008, South Carolina Electric & Gas applied to the Nuclear Regulatory Commission (NRC) for a Combined Construction and Operating License (COL) to build two 1,100 MW AP1000 pressurized water reactors at the site. On May 27, 2008, SCE&G and Santee Cooper announced an engineering, procurement and construction (EPC) contract had been reached with Westinghouse. Costs were estimated to be approximately $9.8 billion for both AP1000 units, plus transmission facility and financing costs. The operators filed an application to increase customers bills by $1.2 billion (2.5%) during the construction period to partially finance capital costs.

In March 2012, the NRC approved the construction license of the two proposed reactors at the Summer plant. As with the license approval for the Vogtle plant, NRC chairman Gregory Jaczko cast the lone dissenting vote, saying "I continue to believe that we should require that all Fukushima-related safety enhancements are implemented before these new reactors begin operating". The reactors were expected to go on-line in 2017 and 2018 respectively.

The construction of Unit 2 began officially on March 9, 2013, with the pouring of concrete for the base mat. The placement of the first concrete was completed on March 11, 2013. Unit 2 was the first reactor to start construction in the US in 30 years. First concrete for Unit 3 was completed on November 4, 2013.

In October 2014, a delay of at least one year and extra costs of $1.2 billion were announced, largely due to fabrication delays. Unit 2 was expected to be substantially complete in late 2018 or early 2019, with unit 3 about a year later.

On July 23, 2015, V. C. Summer Unit 2 reached a milestone with the successful placement of the CA-01 module, one of the largest, heaviest, and most complicated modules within the Nuclear Island, also referred to as a super module because it was so large that huge submodules had to be shipped from the manufacturer and final assembly was completed on site in the twelve-story Module Assembly Building. Installation of CA-01 was long delayed due to both regulatory and production hurdles related to the module. It was the first of the US AP1000 reactors under construction to achieve placement of this critical module, beating Vogtle Unit 3 to this milestone, and allowing other construction activities in the Nuclear Island to progress that could not proceed until the module was in place. CA-01 is a large structural module that forms the internal structures of some compartments within the Containment Vessel, including the Steam Generator compartments, Reactor Vessel cavity, and Refueling Canal. The CA-01 Module is the heaviest module on site, weighing 1,200 tons, or 2.4 million pounds. Because of how much it weighs, lifting and placing the CA-01 module into the Unit 2 Nuclear Island resulted in the heaviest lift for the V. C. Summer construction project to date.

In early 2017 Westinghouse Electric Company revised in-service dates to April 2020 and December 2020 for units 2 and 3. In March 2017, Westinghouse Electric Company filed for Chapter 11 bankruptcy because of $9 billion of losses from its two U.S. nuclear construction projects. SCANA considered its options for the project, and ultimately decided to abandon the project in July 2017. SCANA had determined that completing just Unit 2 and abandoning Unit 3 could be feasible and was leaning toward that option internally, however the project died when minority partner Santee Cooper's board voted to cease all construction and SCANA could not find another partner to take their place.

On July 31, 2017, after an extensive review into the costs of constructing Units 2 and 3, South Carolina Electric and Gas decided to stop construction of the reactors and later filed a Petition for Approval of Abandonment with the Public Service Commission of South Carolina.

In September 2024, a report from the South Carolina Governor's Nuclear Advisory Council stated "No obvious conditions preclude undertaking completion".

In January 2025, it was reported that the South Carolina Public Service Authority (Santee Cooper) was interested in "seeking proposals for buyers to complete the project" and "will accept proposals until May 5". Santee Cooper in October 2025 selected Brookfield Asset Management to complete construction of the two partially-completed AP1000s at the site. Brookfield and The Nuclear Company, a nuclear project development company, announced a joint venture in May 2026 focused on deploying Westinghouse reactors and specifically completing VC Summer. In July 2026, it was reported that Santee Cooper's board was informed that first phase of a feasibility study was done, and the project could move to phase two.

== Electricity production ==
Generation (MWh) of VC Summer Nuclear Generating Station
| Year | Jan | Feb | Mar | Apr | May | Jun | Jul | Aug | Sep | Oct | Nov | Dec | Annual (Total) |
|---|---|---|---|---|---|---|---|---|---|---|---|---|---|
| 2001 | 0 | 0 | 601,607 | 704,613 | 718,019 | 524,248 | 645,265 | 719,895 | 694,465 | 726,263 | 701,487 | 727,486 | 6,763,348 |
| 2002 | 728,990 | 658,069 | 728,693 | 436,865 | 0 | 528,577 | 722,433 | 719,185 | 697,230 | 726,869 | 704,182 | 729,647 | 7,380,740 |
| 2003 | 730,770 | 660,041 | 730,338 | 705,813 | 647,256 | 702,519 | 724,695 | 722,976 | 701,307 | 222,961 | 72,673 | 731,626 | 7,352,975 |
| 2004 | 733,410 | 685,859 | 701,233 | 441,210 | 732,321 | 704,770 | 724,925 | 724,970 | 704,945 | 733,542 | 710,207 | 646,742 | 8,244,134 |
| 2005 | 733,239 | 662,025 | 732,214 | 500,502 | 0 | 639,101 | 711,434 | 616,307 | 701,269 | 731,560 | 707,269 | 734,480 | 7,469,400 |
| 2006 | 734,552 | 663,603 | 735,774 | 710,454 | 710,894 | 688,678 | 716,731 | 718,685 | 698,164 | 292,341 | 121,204 | 730,318 | 7,521,398 |
| 2007 | 731,289 | 596,857 | 729,464 | 700,747 | 725,676 | 694,760 | 723,191 | 720,030 | 698,487 | 724,959 | 704,920 | 728,658 | 8,479,038 |
| 2008 | 556,991 | 651,692 | 727,881 | 574,748 | 0 | 358,159 | 723,084 | 721,789 | 700,482 | 727,468 | 706,459 | 729,348 | 7,178,101 |
| 2009 | 729,027 | 658,963 | 730,125 | 706,936 | 727,749 | 699,952 | 719,799 | 718,259 | 699,906 | 70,076 | 0 | 411,251 | 6,872,043 |
| 2010 | 730,633 | 637,250 | 732,022 | 707,175 | 731,273 | 696,740 | 719,689 | 716,595 | 635,982 | 731,609 | 712,584 | 735,527 | 8,487,079 |
| 2011 | 675,547 | 664,020 | 734,237 | 324,031 | 6,294 | 687,704 | 724,676 | 724,553 | 704,712 | 732,858 | 712,357 | 735,243 | 7,426,232 |
| 2012 | 734,809 | 687,953 | 734,067 | 709,737 | 732,749 | 706,110 | 726,521 | 726,072 | 704,791 | 268,332 | 0 | 550,686 | 7,281,827 |
| 2013 | 735,256 | 665,491 | 520,768 | 658,199 | 735,363 | 707,637 | 730,801 | 730,312 | 705,363 | 733,207 | 712,289 | 735,470 | 8,370,156 |
| 2014 | 735,139 | 664,754 | 735,687 | 80,366 | 2,649 | 690,507 | 392,643 | 729,083 | 705,625 | 732,821 | 712,372 | 734,555 | 6,916,201 |
| 2015 | 712,364 | 664,143 | 734,673 | 710,036 | 733,481 | 705,475 | 725,785 | 723,948 | 702,122 | 39,336 | 0 | 664,034 | 7,115,397 |
| 2016 | 736,703 | 690,163 | 736,830 | 713,812 | 736,346 | 709,129 | 719,413 | 724,235 | 706,187 | 735,016 | 712,643 | 737,884 | 8,658,361 |
| 2017 | 738,145 | 665,587 | 735,889 | 155,103 | 0 | 629,744 | 702,621 | 641,129 | 524,120 | 735,406 | 647,265 | 738,285 | 6,913,294 |
| 2018 | 738,061 | 666,522 | 737,076 | 714,104 | 723,180 | 709,283 | 729,878 | 729,339 | 705,973 | 104,707 | 74,007 | 734,261 | 7,366,391 |
| 2019 | 737,670 | 667,263 | 730,381 | 714,430 | 735,896 | 709,474 | 730,714 | 730,227 | 707,161 | 735,003 | 311,045 | 739,172 | 8,248,436 |
| 2020 | 739,618 | 692,043 | 738,140 | 221,847 | 436,990 | 711,798 | 719,802 | 698,503 | 575,284 | 736,732 | 716,316 | 740,452 | 7,727,525 |
| 2021 | 739,516 | 668,022 | 738,351 | 715,358 | 665,428 | 711,500 | 731,808 | 506,243 | 486,449 | 166,154 | 8,748 | 415,196 | 6,552,773 |
| 2022 | 738,525 | 602,447 | 736,920 | 714,261 | 736,109 | 709,204 | 730,109 | 729,927 | 704,128 | 736,983 | 714,913 | 738,207 | 8,591,733 |
| 2023 | 737,836 | 666,157 | 736,316 | 101,606 | 203,475 | 712,092 | 732,311 | 729,803 | 708,032 | 736,747 | 713,763 | 737,571 | 7,515,709 |
| 2024 | 737,346 | 689,888 | 736,297 | 713,627 | 735,059 | 706,560 | 724,131 | 725,741 | 453,703 | 0 | 463,383 | 735,431 | 7,421,166 |
| 2025 | 735,886 | 593,996 | 737,042 | 714,920 | 736,564 | 708,650 | 757,004 | 719,583 | 707,105 | 254,881 | 711,813 | 737,114 | 8,114,558 |
| 2026 | 711,933 | 382,544 | 0 | 430,065 | 730,760 | 703,915 | 723,269 | 720,535 | | | | | -- |

== Surrounding population ==
The Nuclear Regulatory Commission defines two emergency planning zones around nuclear power plants: a plume exposure pathway zone with a radius of 10 miles (16 km), concerned primarily with exposure to, and inhalation of, airborne radioactive contamination, and an ingestion pathway zone of about 50 miles (80 km), concerned primarily with ingestion of food and liquid contaminated by radioactivity.

The 2010 U.S. population within 10 miles (16 km) of Summer was 17,599, an increase of 26.2 percent in a decade, according to an analysis of U.S. Census data for msnbc.com. The 2010 U.S. population within 50 miles (80 km) was 1,187,554, an increase of 14.3 percent since 2000. Cities within 50 miles include Columbia (30 miles to city center).

== Seismic risk ==
The Nuclear Regulatory Commission's estimate of the risk each year of an earthquake intense enough to cause core damage to the reactor at Summer was 1 in 26,316 years, according to an NRC study published in August 2010.

== Reactor data ==
The Virgil C. Summer Nuclear Generating Station consists of one operational reactor. Two additional units under construction were cancelled on July 31, 2017.

| Reactor unit | Reactor type | Capacity(MW) | | Construction started | Electricity grid connection | Commercial operation | Shutdown |
| Reactor unit | Reactor type | Net | Gross | Construction started | Electricity grid connection | Commercial operation | Shutdown |
|---|---|---|---|---|---|---|---|
| Virgil C. Summer-1 | Westinghouse 3-Loop | 966 | 1003 | 1973-03-21 | 1982-11-16 | 1984-01-01 | |
| Virgil C. Summer-2 | Westinghouse AP1000 | 1117 | 1250 | 2013-03-09 | Cancelled | N/A | |
| Virgil C. Summer-3 | Westinghouse AP1000 | 1117 | 1250 | 2013-11-02 | Cancelled | N/A | |

== See also ==
- List of largest power stations in the United States
- Olkiluoto Nuclear Power Plant
- Vogtle Electric Generating Plant
