= Saluda Lake =

Man-made lake in South Carolina, USA

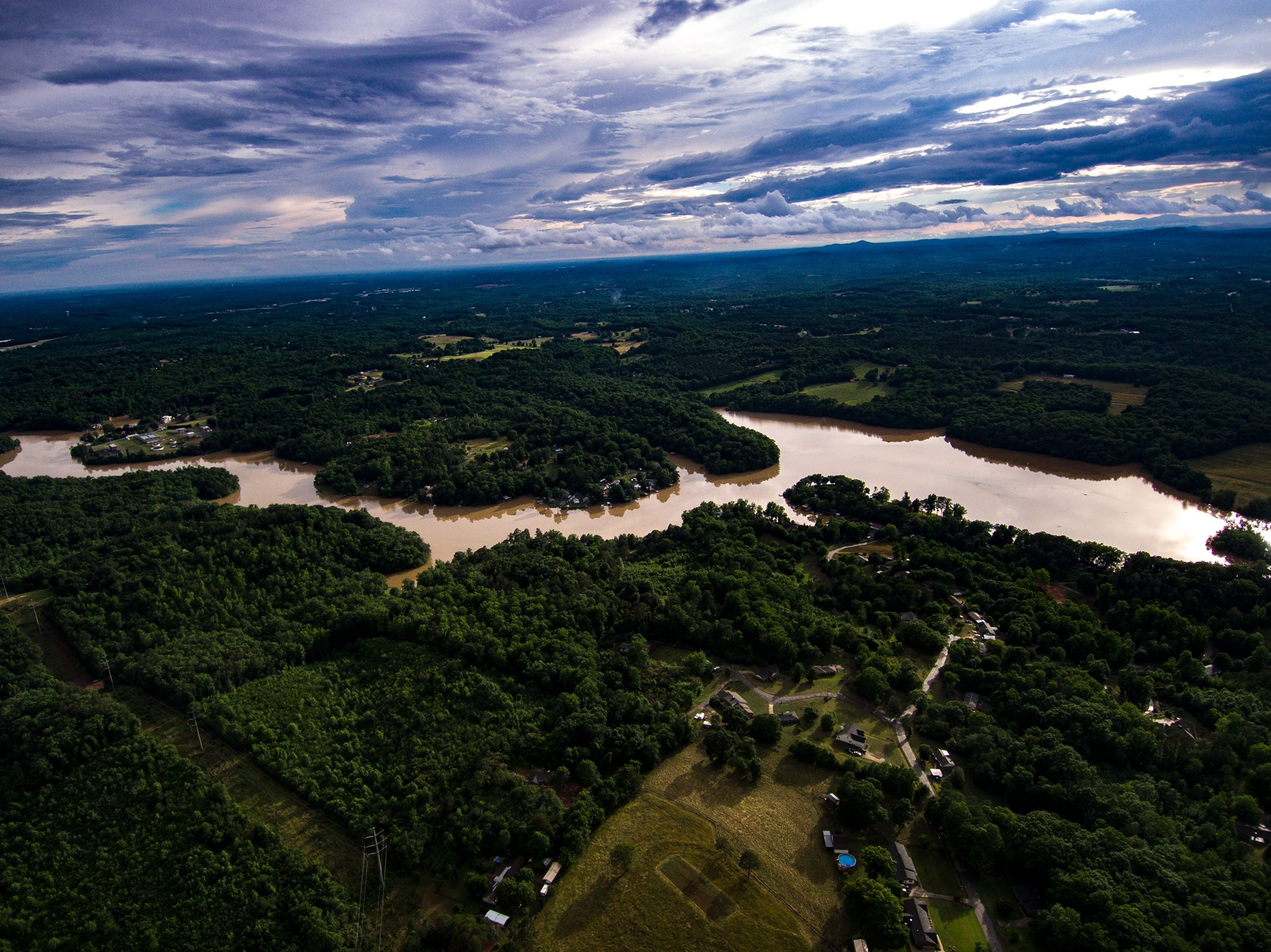
- An aerial shot of Saluda Lake circa 2019 from the Greenville side facing towards Easley

- Location within South Carolina
- Location: Greenville / Pickens counties, South Carolina
- Coordinates: 34°52′05″N 82°29′19″W
- Type: reservoir
- Basin countries: United States
- Surface area: 331 acres (1.34 km^{2})
- Average depth: 7.9 ft (2.4 m)
- Max. depth: 40 ft (12 m)
- Surface elevation: 850 ft (259 m)

Saluda Lake is a 331-acre (1.34 km^{2}) reservoir formed by a spillway from the uppermost dam on the Saluda River in South Carolina, United States. The lake was constructed in 1905 for the purpose of creating hydroelectric power. Duke Power Company formerly owned the lake and then sold it to North Brook Energy, LLC.

== See also ==
- List of lakes in South Carolina
