= Nukegate scandal =

Political and legal scandal in South Carolina

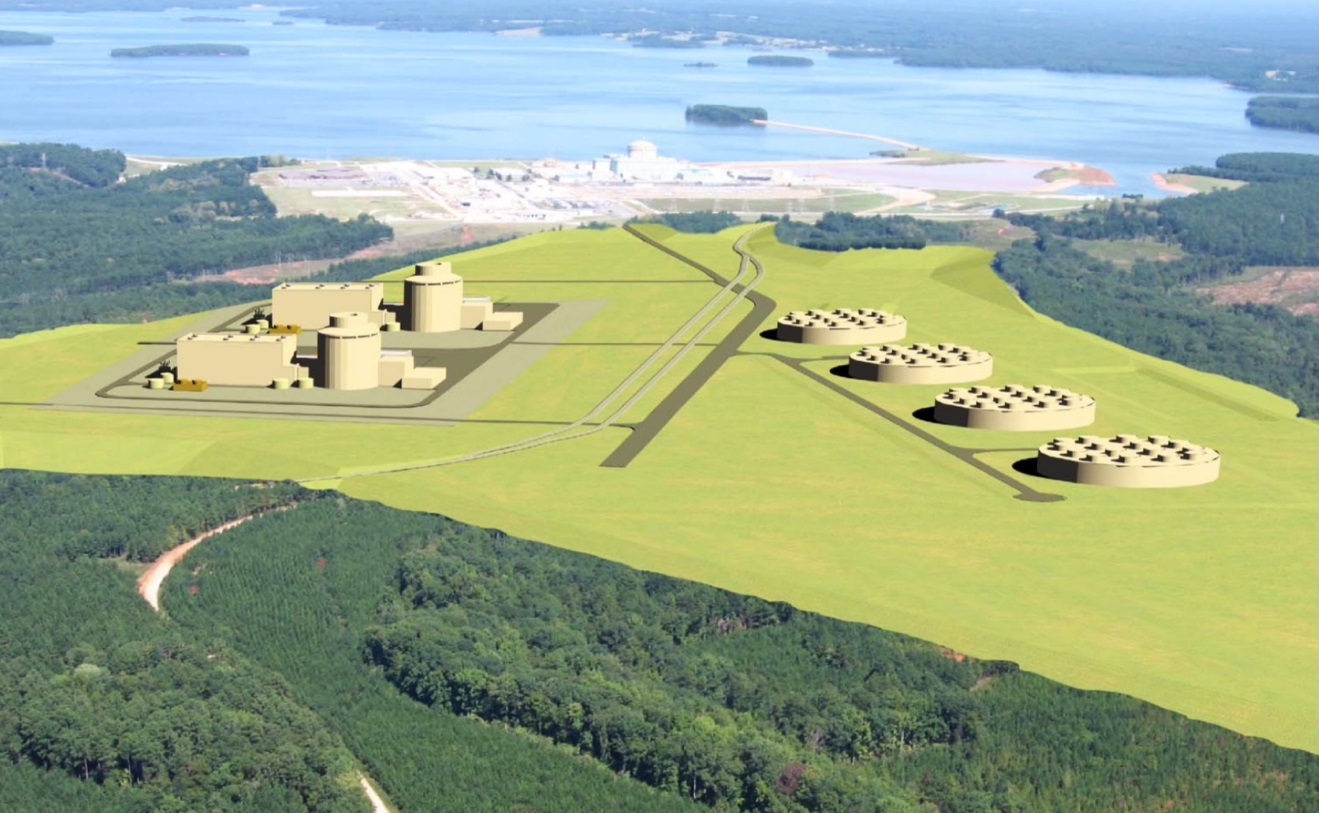
Artist’s view of the two new AP1000 units, adjacent to existing Virgil C. Summer nuclear facility.

The Nukegate scandal was a political and legal scandal that arose from the abandonment of the project to construct two additional nuclear reactors at the Virgil C. Summer Nuclear Generating Station in South Carolina in 2017. South Carolina Electric & Gas (SCE&G) and the South Carolina Public Service Authority (Santee Cooper) collectively invested $9 billion into the construction of two nuclear reactors in Fairfield County, South Carolina from 2008 until 2017. The utilities shifted the risk onto their customers using a state law that allowed utilities to raise consumers' electricity rates to pay for nuclear construction, which led to public outrage.

In 2008, the utilities contracted with Westinghouse to build two AP1000 nuclear reactors for an estimated cost of $9.8 billion. The AP1000 design was unique because it relied on pre-fabricated parts which allowed for modular construction. Construction began in 2013, however numerous delays occurred from 2014 to 2017 due to manufacturing errors and incompetence. In 2017, the estimated construction cost had grown to $25 billion. These cost overruns led Westinghouse, whose contracts required them to pay the construction costs of this expansion and their separate project to build two new reactors at Vogtle nuclear plant in Georgia, to file for Chapter 11 bankruptcy in March 2017. Several months later the project was abandoned by Santee Cooper and SCE&G's parent company, SCANA. Ratepayers continue to pay increased rates for the expansion despite its termination.

The economic losses and subsequent public outrage drastically altered the future of both utilities. The total cost paid by both utilities in legal settlements to ratepayers and shareholders exceeded a billion dollars. The stock of SCANA, the only Fortune 500 company based in South Carolina, dramatically fell. Both SCANA and SCE&G merged with Dominion Energy in 2019. Until the COVID-19 pandemic, the largest issue debated in the South Carolina General Assembly was whether or not to privatize Santee Cooper. In 2021, the General Assembly ultimately decided to reform the organization instead. Santee Cooper will remain under state ownership. However, its board will undergo change.

As a result of Nukegate, two SCANA executives, CEO Kevin Marsh, and Vice President Stephen Byrne, pleaded guilty for fraud after being charged by the U.S. Attorney's office. Their crimes centered around their efforts to hide the construction delays from shareholders and regulators. The construction of the two units needed to be finished by 2020 in order to qualify for over $2 billion in federal tax credits. The viability of the project relied on receiving the tax credits. However, both men admitted that they knew the project was not going to be completed in time to qualify for the credits and that they hid that information from regulators and shareholders. Both men have also been indicted by the U.S. Securities and Exchange Commission for securities fraud. In 2021, Marsh was sentenced to two years in prison and in 2023 Byrne was sentenced to fifteen months in prison. As of March 2023, two executives at Westinghouse have also been charged with crimes. However, due to Santee Cooper's limited involvement, no executives from that organization were charged with any crimes.

== Construction ==
=== Troubled construction ===
In May, 2008, SCE&G (a subsidiary of SCANA) and Santee Cooper announced that they had signed an engineering, procurement and construction contract with Westinghouse to build two AP1000 nuclear reactors. The CEO of Santee Cooper cited the state's projected growth as a determining factor for increasing the utility's energy capacity. Both utilities were joint owners (SCE&G owned 55 percent, Santee Cooper owned 45 percent) in the project and shared operating costs. The two reactors, with an estimated cost of $9.8 billion, would be the first built in the United States in the last thirty years and were heralded by its proponents as leading the United States into a new nuclear renaissance.

The AP1000 design was seen as novel because of its simplified structure and use of pre-fabricated nuclear reactor parts that allowed for modular construction. Construction began on the units in 2013 after the design was approved by the Nuclear Regulatory Commission. However, contractors lacked the requisite experience because the nuclear power construction industry had stagnated for thirty years. The stagnation also resulted in inadequate supply chains. Ultimately, Westinghouse had to take over the construction of the units itself, something the company was not qualified for.

Westinghouse's management of the construction proved to be calamitous. The construction site employed five thousand laborers, who built two new concrete plants on the site to continuously pour concrete as well as a seven-story-tall building to assemble structural modules. But the site lacked a fully-integrated construction schedule and the pre-fabricated nuclear reactor parts that arrived on-site had been manufactured incorrectly, which caused significant delays. In 2008, the initial cost estimate of the expansion was $9.8 billion, but by 2017 it had ballooned to $25 billion.

During the construction process, Westinghouse and other contractors at V. C. Summer violated state law by having unlicensed workers create mechanical and electrical blueprints without having a professional engineer sign off on them. SCANA received a memo from Westinghouse's deputy counsel which stated that the contractors did not have to follow South Carolina law because the company's federal license superseded the state's requirements. Executives at Santee Cooper claim they were not made aware of the Westinghouse memo. The legality of that memo is in question. Nonetheless, the blueprints were often faulty and resulted in "[d]elays, incorrect parts, thousands of engineering changes, and billions of dollars in wasted money".

=== 2015 audit ===
Santee Cooper and SCE&G hired Bechtel to audit the project in 2015. Bechtel's draft audit stated that the nuclear reactors would not be finished in time to collect the $2 billion in federal tax credits which the project relied on. However, in Bechtel's final report released in February 2016, the previous finding was removed from the audit at the request of an attorney working for both utilities. Relying on the impression that the reactors would qualify for the tax credits, the state Public Service Commission approved an $800 million increase in the project's budget as well as a fixed-price contract with Westinghouse.

=== Westinghouse bankruptcy and the project's demise ===
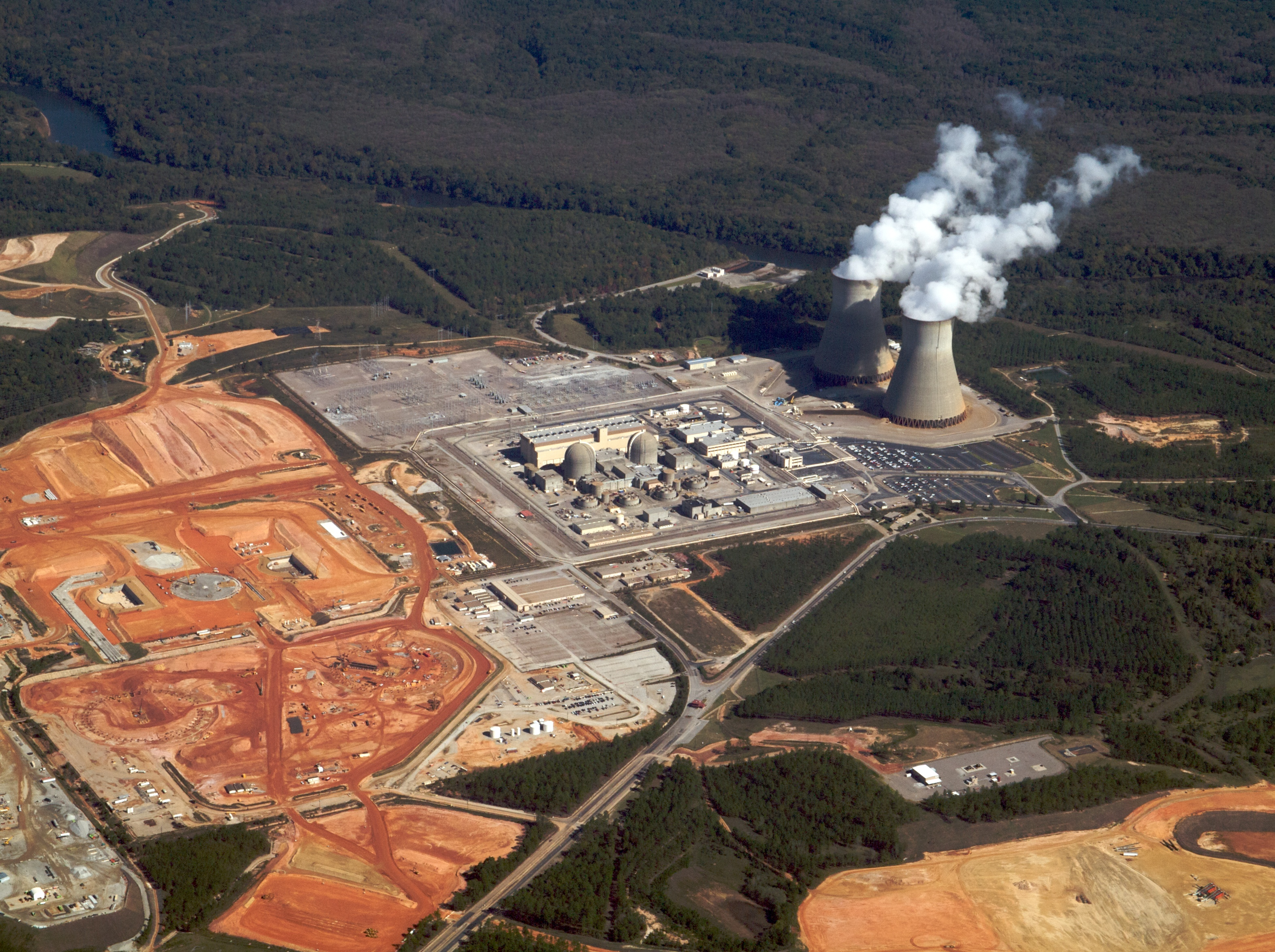
The construction of twin AP1000 units at the Vogtle Electric Generating Plant in Georgia also faced cost overruns and delays.

On March 31, 2017, Westinghouse filed for Chapter 11 bankruptcy due to the costs incurred from both the V. C. Summer expansion as well as the construction of two additional units in Burke County, Georgia. The bankruptcy was seen as a huge blow for the nuclear energy industry. At the time, construction on both units was only 30 percent complete but the majority of the reactor parts were on-site. Santee Cooper decided to halt construction against SCANA's wishes. The utilities announced that the halt in construction was due in part to a change in the energy industry brought on by more energy efficient technology and the natural gas boom.

In July 2017, the companies announced that they had made an agreement with Toshiba, Westinghouse's parent company, to release Westinghouse from its prior obligations for $2.2 billion. Further, in 2020, Santee Cooper and Westinghouse announced a separate agreement to sell the remaining reactor parts and to share in the profits.

At the point of termination, SCE&G and Santee Cooper had invested $9 billion into the project. The announcement sent SCANA's stock reeling. The project became known as the largest business failure in the state's history. The subsequent federal investigation of the failure led to it being nicknamed "Nukegate", a phrase derived from the Watergate scandal.

== Base Load Review Act ==
The failure was made possible by the Base Load Review Act that was passed by the South Carolina General Assembly in April, 2007. The act made it easier for electric utilities to charge ratepayers for the construction of nuclear reactors. The bill, sponsored by state senator Glenn McConnell, essentially allowed the utilities to shift the risk of the construction to ratepayers. Utilities would be able to file a request with the Public Service Commission to raise rates for plant construction. If the commission found the application to be "prudent", the commission would issue a project development order allowing the utility to increase rates. However, the statute did not define what was or was not "prudent". Critics of the act argued that "any management decision by the utility that impact[ed] the cost and schedule of the project" essentially had to be "deemed prudent by the Public Service Commission if it advance[d] the completion of the project", and that this resulted in "cost overruns and schedule delays [becoming] a natural unintended consequence" of the act.

Governor Mark Sanford refused to sign the bill but after a five-day moratorium, the bill became law on May 3, 2007. Sanford's chief of staff later said that the Base Load Review Act "was probably the clearest case [he] could ever see of a special interest using all of its power and leverage to get something passed". From its inception to its enactment, the bill's legislative process was considered remarkably fast.

From 2008 to 2016, SCE&G sought and received nine utility rate hikes to pay for the nuclear expansion. By 2017, SCE&G ratepayers had paid an additional $1.4 billion due to the hikes. A typical SCE&G consumer paid an extra $27 per electricity bill for the expansion, and a typical Santee Cooper consumer paid an extra $6.50. By 2018, South Carolina utility prices were among the highest in the country. This was made easier because in 2004 the General Assembly had gotten rid of the state's consumer advocate.

The South Carolina Senate unanimously repealed the act on May 9, 2018. In June 2018, Governor Henry McMaster's veto of the repeal was overridden by the General Assembly.

== Legal ramifications ==
=== Stakeholder lawsuits ===
Both utilities settled lawsuits as a result of the expansion's failure. Attorneys representing SCE&G ratepayers and shareholders settled with the utility for $392.5 million ($200 million would be for ratepayers and $192.5 million for shareholders). Santee Cooper settled with its ratepayers and local electric co-operatives for $520 million. And in December 2020, the utility settled with investors who purchased bonds from the utility for $2 million.

In 2020, a judge struck down the city of Goose Creek's attempt to annex and then take over the power supply of a local aluminum smelter. The judge stated that it violated state law granting Santee Cooper exclusive service over the aluminum smelter's site. Commentators and lawmakers cited the Nukegate scandal as a reason why the city utility should be allowed to supply the aluminum smelter's electricity.

=== SEC lawsuit ===
In March 2020, the U.S. Securities and Exchange Commission sued SCANA, SCE&G, Kevin Marsh (SCANA's CEO at the time), and Steve Byrne (a former SCANA vice president) for repeatedly deceiving investors. The complaint alleged that the parties misled investors by claiming that the project would qualify for more than $1 billion in federal tax credits. On December 2, 2020, the SEC announced that SCANA and SCE&G agreed to settle the claims against them for $112.5 million in disgorgement fees as well as a $25 million penalty to be paid by SCANA (now Dominion Energy). The litigation against Marsh and Byrne is ongoing.

=== SCANA ===
Federal prosecutors probed the V. C. Summer failure from 2017 to 2020. In July 2020, Byrne admitted to taking part in a conspiracy to hide damaging information from regulators as well as the public and therefore defrauding SCE&G customers. On November 24, 2020, Marsh announced he would also plead guilty to federal fraud charges. In December 2020, Marsh also pled guilty to an additional third charge: conspiracy to commit wire and mail fraud. Both men admitted to knowing that the project would not qualify for crucial federal tax credits with a deadline in 2020, and that they hid this information from shareholders.

Both men also admitted to providing false information in "earning calls, presentations and press releases" in order to benefit SCANA. They were made aware in 2015 that only 8% of the expansion had been completed and therefore V. C. Summer was unlikely to qualify for direly needed federal tax credits that had a 2020 deadline. Neither shared this information with shareholders or state regulators. Additionally, Byrne and Marsh ensured that the Bechtel report sent to Santee Cooper lacked damaging information.

The SEC has charged both Byrne and Marsh with securities fraud. The complaint alleges that:

[Marsh and Byrne] claimed the project was on track even though they knew it was far behind schedule. This could make it unlikely to qualify for the tax credits. A SCANA executive said that officers of the company "flew around the country showing the same . . . construction pictures from different angles and played our fiddles" while the project itself "was going up in flames." SCANA abandoned the project in mid-2017 with neither nuclear unit completed. The false statements and omissions enabled SCANA to boost its stock price, sell more than $1 billion in bonds, and obtain regulatory approval to raise customers' rates.

Marsh was sentenced to two years in a federal prison on October 7, 2021 on charges of conspiracy to commit mail and wire fraud, and on October 11, 2021 he began to serve a two year state sentence concurrently as part of a plea deal. Byrne was sentenced to fifteen months in prison on March 8, 2023.

=== Westinghouse ===
On June 10, 2021, a former Westinghouse vice president, Carl Churchman, pled guilty to lying to federal investigators. The lie told to the FBI by Churchman was that Churchman had no role in relaying false completion projections to SCANA executives. He faces up to five years in prison. Assistant U.S. Attorney, Winston Holiday, has asserted that Churchman was a key witness in the ongoing investigation. In August 2021, another former Westinghouse executive, Jeffery A. Benjamin, was indicted for fraud and conspiracy.

== Consequences for SCANA and Santee Cooper ==
=== SCANA-Dominion merger ===
SCANA faced virulent criticism following the collapse of the V. C. Summer expansion. The company was criticized for not having anyone with nuclear power experience on its board. The board itself was further criticized for either neglecting its financial oversight of the V. C. Summer project or for overseeing the incompetent management of the project. It was determined that throughout most of the project's existence, executives at SCANA knew the project's viability was at risk. But the company lacked the necessary oversight to oversee the project.

In 2018, Dominion Energy submitted a bid to purchase SCANA and SCE&G. The company offered and advertised a refund of $1,000 to customers. However, lawmakers realized that Dominion wanted to then recoup that money with higher rates over the next decade. In December 2019, Dominion Energy purchased SCANA and SCE&G with an updated bid that replaced the $1,000 checks with lower rates for customers. Customers will continue to pay an extra $2.3 billion to cover the expansion costs over the next two decades.

In 2021, Dominion Energy settled with the state tax agency on unpaid taxes owed due to the unfinished nuclear project at a cost of $165 million. As part of that settlement, the State and Dominion Energy agreed that Dominion would offset approximately a third of the unpaid taxes by turning over more than 2,900 acres of land which will ultimately become six new state parks.

=== 2019-2020 ===
Following the V. C. Summer failure, the predominant issue facing the South Carolina General Assembly from 2018 until the COVID-19 pandemic in 2020 was whether to sell Santee Cooper or to reform the utility's management. The sale of the utility is favored by Governor McMaster. He has called Santee Cooper a "rogue agency" due to its independence and financial problems. But the utility's debt consisting of $7 billion has complicated proposals. The legislature passed a law at the end of the 2020 session prohibiting Santee Cooper from "entering into agreements that could make it harder for the General Assembly to sell the state-owned utility" in 2021. In November 2020, Hugh Leatherman, the chairman for the senate finance committee, called for the chairman of Santee Cooper to resign after the utility entered into a $638 million debt deal. Leatherman stated the deal may have violated state law. From at least 2017 to April 2021, the Santee Cooper board was without a permanent chairman.

Several companies submitted bids to purchase the utility and in February 2020, the South Carolina Department of Administration chose NextEra Energy of Florida as the recommended bidder. However, Santee Cooper submitted a separate plan to the general assembly to save ratepayers $2.3 billion over the next twenty years by pivoting from coal power plants towards renewable energy. The utility also advocated for reform of its board to bring in more expertise, and for a more open rate-setting and construction process.

Hugh Leatherman stated that without "meaningful reform that includes a new board and increased oversight" the only option was to divest the state from the utility. Santee Cooper consumers will continue to pay an extra 5% per electricity bill over the next twelve years to pay off the utility's debt.

=== 2021 ===
The future of Santee Cooper was a priority of the 2021 legislative session. In the first week of the 2021 session, the House Ways and Means Committee passed a bill creating a committee composed of members of the General Assembly to revisit a sale of Santee Cooper. The bill, which will be considered by the entirety of the House next, also includes "an amendment that would do away with NextEra as the preferred buyer" and "a provision for reforming Santee Cooper". On the Senate side of the General Assembly, the Senate Judiciary Committee, concerned about NextEra's behavior in a separate deal in Florida, requested more information from the utility concerning its bid in early January 2021. However, NextEra rejected to meet with the committee.

On April 22, 2021, the South Carolina Senate overwhelmingly voted on a bill that would reform Santee Cooper. Included in the bill is a timeline to replace every member of the Santee Cooper board, regulations subjecting the utility to reviews and oversight, and a ban on the utility's practice of giving executives large severance packages. In May, 2021, NextEra rescinded its bid to purchase Santee Cooper. In June 2021, the General Assembly met in conference for a special session to reconcile the two reform proposals from both houses of the General Assembly. On June 8, the reform bill was signed into law, largely consisting of the Senate proposal. Santee Cooper will remain under state ownership. Further, consumers will have a greater say in rate hikes and Santee Cooper will face greater accountability from state lawmakers.

== Political ramifications ==
Most of the original state legislators who were serving in the General Assembly when the Base Load Review Act was passed are out of office. Some of their replacements in the state legislature, who were not in office at the time of its original passing, have faced criticism in the aftermath of the V. C. Summer failure, nonetheless. Observers believe state senator Luke Rankin’s association with Santee Cooper led him to have an unexpectedly tight primary race in 2020. Rankin was forced into a run-off which he ultimately won. Additionally, Governor McMaster has faced criticism for how he has handled the future of Santee Cooper.

The Coastal Conservation League criticized the General Assembly's consumer-centric approach when considering the future of Santee Cooper. The organization has claimed that the legislature has failed to evaluate potential consequences to the climate potentially caused by the different proposals.

== External sources ==
- Base Load Review Act
- Base Load Review Act Cumulative Rate Increases
- Base Load Review Act Repeal Legislation
- Kevin Marsh testimony to NRC in 2008
