= Colleton Solar Farm =

Energy facility in South Carolina

- Country: United States
- Location: Colleton County, South Carolina
- Coordinates: 32°54′39″N 80°41′48″W
- Status: Operational
- Construction began: 2012
- Commission date: 2013
- Owners: Santee Cooper, TIG Sun Ventures
- Operator: Santee Cooper

Solar farm
- Type: Standard PV

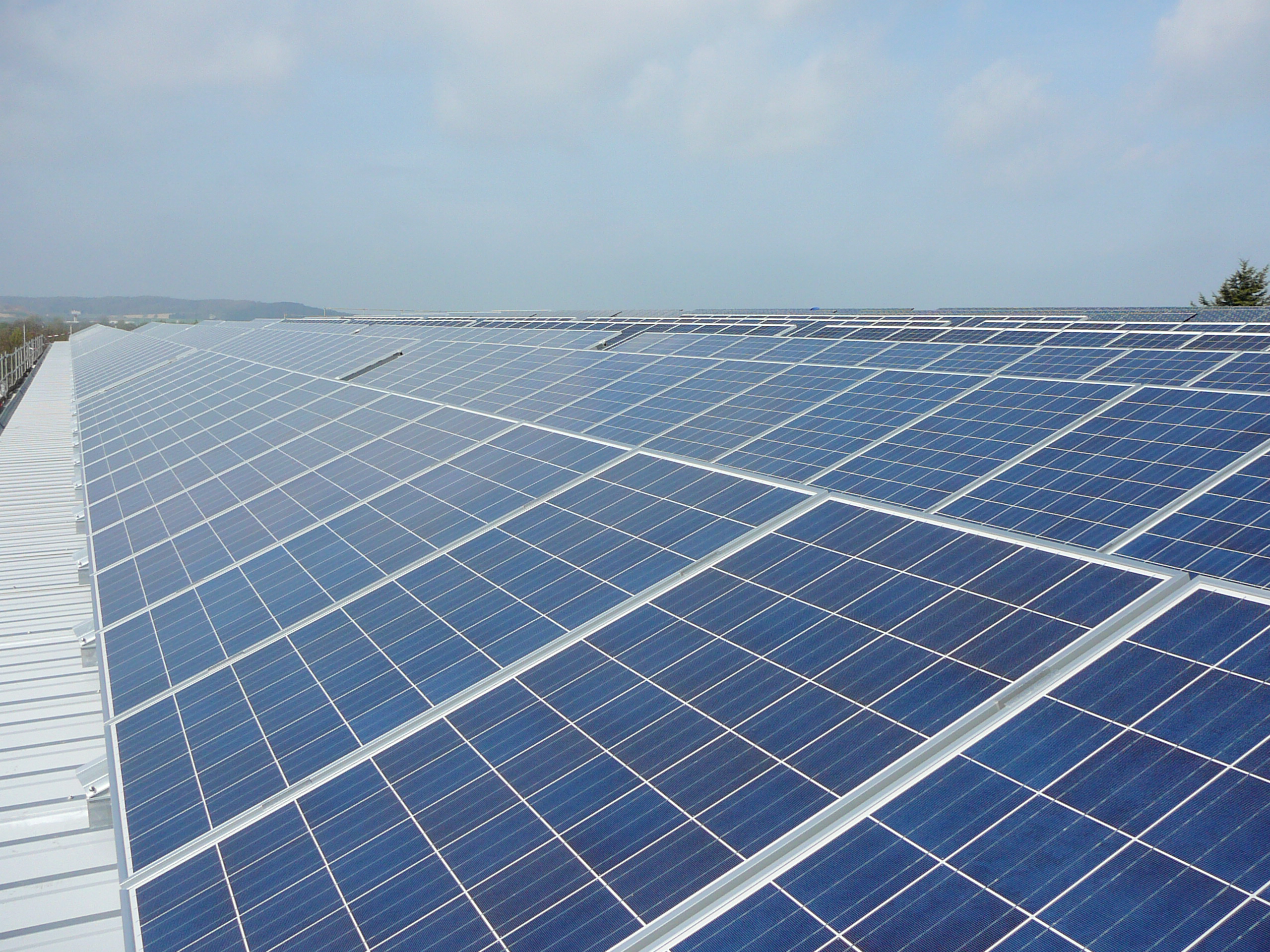

Colleton Solar Farm is an energy facility in Walterboro in Colleton County, South Carolina that is operated by the states public energy company, Santee Cooper. The site has 10,010 solar panels, and the annual output is about 4556 mWh. The Colleton Solar farm is one of the largest of its kind in the state, has often been cited as a major investment for renewable energy in South Carolina.

in 2015, the farm earned the ACEC National Award of Recognition and the ACEC SC Engineering Excellence Award.

== History ==
The site was first announced in 2013 as a joint venture between Santee Cooper and TIG Sun Energy LLC. The construction of the site was expedited in order to qualify for federal tax credits, and the initial 1,010 panels and utility building were completed in 57 days.

In December 2013, the plant began operations under Santee Cooper. Once the plant opened, the size of the farm increased by 1 acre, from 14 to 15 acres.

In 2014, The site announced that it surpassed its production goals, and would continue to expand. By March 2015, the site increased in size from 15 acres to 27 acres.

In 2015, the farm announced that it had met its annual energy production goals.
