= Pacolet River =

River in South Carolina, United States

Coordinates: 34.839665°N 81.457818°W

Pacolet River Pacolate River

Location
- Country: United States
- States: South Carolina; North Carolina

Physical characteristics
- Source: Confluence of North Pacolet River and South Pacolet River
  - location: North of Spartanburg County, South Carolina
- Mouth: Broad River
  - location: Cherokee–Union line, South Carolina
- Length: 50 m (160 ft)
- Basin size: Part of the Santee River watershed

The Pacolet River is a tributary of the Broad River, about 50 miles (80 km) long, in northwestern South Carolina in the United States. One of its principal headwaters tributaries also drains a small portion of western North Carolina. Via the Broad and Congaree rivers, it is part of the watershed of the Santee River, which flows to the Atlantic Ocean. The stream's name has also been spelled historically as "Pacolate River".

== Course ==
The Pacolet is formed by the confluence of its short north and south forks:

- The North Pacolet River rises in the Blue Ridge Mountains in southeastern Henderson County, North Carolina and flows eastwardly into Polk County. It then passes near the town of Tryon and turns southeastwardly into northern Spartanburg County, South Carolina.
- The South Pacolet River rises in northeastern Greenville County, South Carolina, and flows eastwardly into northern Spartanburg County, where it passes the town of Campobello and is dammed to form Lake William C. Bowen.

The two forks join 10 miles (16 km) north-northeast of Spartanburg, and the Pacolet then flows generally southeastwardly, through or along the boundaries of Spartanburg, Cherokee and Union counties, through Lake Blalock and past the town of Pacolet. It joins the Broad River on the common boundary of Cherokee and Union Counties, 4 miles (6 km) north of the town of Lockhart.

In Spartanburg County the Pacolet collects Lawsons Fork Creek, which historically has also been known as "Lawsons Fork of the Pacolet River". The creek flows for its entire length in Spartanburg County, passing through the city of Spartanburg.

== See also ==
- List of North Carolina rivers
- List of South Carolina rivers
