= Monticello Reservoir =

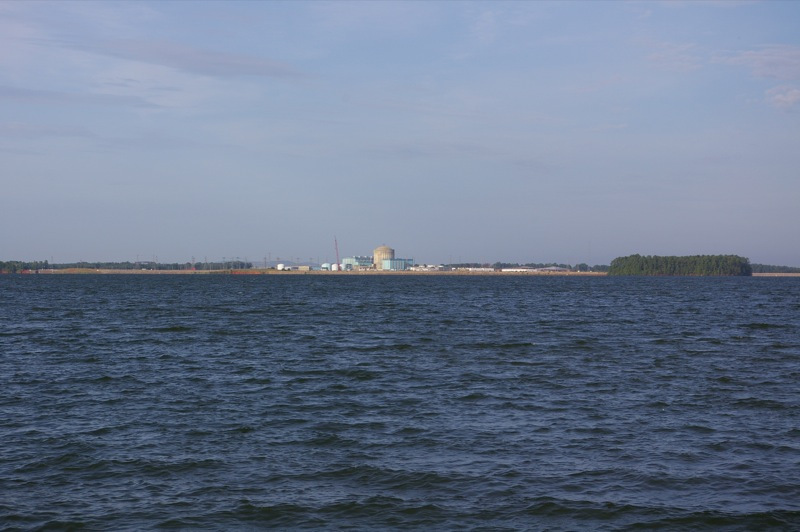
- The Monticello Reservoir with a view of the Virgil C. Summer Nuclear Generating Station

- Location within South Carolina
- Location: Fairfield County, South Carolina, United States
- Coordinates: 34°18′19″N 81°19′41″W
- Type: reservoir
- Primary inflows: Frees Creek
- Primary outflows: Parr Reservoir
- Basin countries: United States
- Max. length: 6.5 mi (10.5 km)
- Max. width: 2.5 mi (4.0 km)
- Max. depth: 89 ft (27 m)
- Surface elevation: 387 ft (118 m)
- Settlements: Jenkinsville, South Carolina

Monticello is a reservoir in the U.S. state of South Carolina, built to provide water for the Virgil C. Summer Nuclear Generating Station. It is located in Jenkinsville. While it does not dam any major rivers, its outflow flows directly into Parr Reservoir, an artificial lake created along the Broad River, via the Fairfield Pumped Storage power station.

The lake is mainly used to cool the turbines of a nearby nuclear power plant. It is famous locally for its catfishing, as some 60 lb. and up fish have been pulled from its waters.

Fluctuations in the level of the reservoir are thought to have increased the incidence of induced seismicity in the area.

The referenced study by Talwani [2] actually states that after an initial increase, levels of seismicity at Monticello have returned to pre-reservoir levels. Therefore, induced seismicity is linked with the initial impoundment, and is not an ongoing issue at this location.

== See also ==
- List of lakes in South Carolina
