= SCANA =

American public energy utility

SCANA Corporation
- Industry: Public utility
- Predecessor: South Carolina Electric & Gas Company; Carolina Energies
- Founded: 1924; 102 years ago
- Defunct: January 2, 2019; 7 years ago
- Fate: Acquired by Dominion Energy
- Headquarters: 100 Scana Parkway, Cayce, South Carolina, United States
- Area served: South Carolina; North Carolina; Georgia
- Key people: Jimmy E. Addison (CEO)
- Revenue: $4.407 billion (2017)
- Net income: -$0.119 billion (2017)
- Total assets: $18.739 billion (2017)
- Total equity: $5.255 billion (2017)
- Number of employees: 5,228 (2017)

SCANA Corporation was an American regulated electric and natural gas public utility. The company was based in Cayce, South Carolina, a suburb of Columbia, South Carolina. Following the Nukegate scandal, the company's stock fell and the company was in disrepair. In January 2019, SCANA was acquired by Dominion Energy. The corporate name SCANA was not an acronym, but was taken from the letters in South Carolina (S [outh]-C-A-[roli] N-A).

The company operated 4 hydroelectric plants, 1 pumped-storage hydroelectricity plant, 4 coal fossil fuel power station, the Virgil C. Summer Nuclear Generating Station, 1 combined cycle power plant, 1 "re-powered" formerly coal-fired plant with a natural gas-powered steam unit and two combined cycle units, and 16 simple cycle combustion turbines. The total output was over 5,800 MW.

== History ==
SCANA traced its history to 1846, when a group of Charleston business leaders formed the Charleston Gas Light Company. Its corporate structure dated to 1924, with the formation of Broad River Power Company. In 1925, Broad River bought the electric and gas properties of Columbia Railway, Gas and Electric Company. In 1937, the Broad River Power Company changed its name to South Carolina Electric & Gas Company.

In 1942, SCE&G acquired Lexington Water Power Company. Lexington Water Power Company had built the Saluda Dam, which created the 50,000-acre (202 km^{2}) Lake Murray, and was the largest man-made barrier built for power production in the world when completed in 1930. In 1948, the company acquired South Carolina Power Company, successor to Charleston Gas Light, from the Southern Company. In 1984, SCE&G reorganized as a holding company, SCANA, with SCE&G as its leading subsidiary.

In 1997, the company sold Scana Petroleum Resources Inc. for $110 million. In 1999, the company sold its retail propane assets for $86 million. In February 2000, the company acquired Public Service of North Carolina for $673 million. In March 2004, the company acquired 50,000 retail natural gas customers formerly served by Energy America in Georgia.

On February 2, 2015, Carolina Gas Transmission was sold to Dominion Resources for $492.9 million. Formed in November 2006, Carolina Gas Transmission was an interstate natural gas pipeline in South Carolina and Georgia regulated by the Federal Energy Regulatory Commission. Its predecessors were the South Carolina Pipeline Company and SCG Pipeline Company. Carolina Gas Transmission received gas from Southern Natural Gas Company, Transcontinental Gas Pipe Line Corporation and the Southern LNG terminal at Elba Island, Georgia.

On February 23, 2015, SCANA Communications was sold to Spirit Communications for $150 million. SCANA Communications operated fiber optic long line and access networks throughout South Carolina and in parts of North Carolina and Georgia in partnership with regional interexchange carriers. SCANA Communications also offered clients with Point of presence (POP) equipment co-location at designated sites along the fiber route and had a state-of-the-art data center in downtown Columbia, South Carolina. Services included site acquisition, zoning support, build-to-suite, site management of existing towers, shared tenant colocation centres, and fiber backbone access.

After having spent $9 billion on construction, in July 2017, SCE&G abandoned the construction of two additional AP1000 units at the Virgil C. Summer Nuclear Generating Station, following the bankruptcy of Westinghouse Electric Company. Some investors and ratepayers filed lawsuits against SCE&G, and some federal and state agencies started investigations. SCE&G proposed replacing the nuclear capacity with gas and solar generation with shareholders absorbing the costs of the abandoned nuclear plant and customer charges reverting to pre-nuclear project rates.

In May 2018, the company acquired the Columbia Energy Center in Gaston, South Carolina for $180 million. In January 2019, the company was acquired by Dominion Energy. By March 2019, the SCANA, SCE&G and PSNC names were retired.

== Divisions ==
SCE&G (South Carolina Electric & Gas Company) was engaged in the generation, transmission, distribution and sale of electricity to approximately 719,000 customers in a service area encompassing approximately 16,000 square miles (41,000 km^{2}) in 24 counties of South Carolina and the purchase, sale and transportation of natural gas to approximately 368,000 customers in a service area encompassing approximately 23,000 square miles (60,000 km^{2}) in all 35 counties of South Carolina.

SCANA Energy, based in Atlanta, Georgia, was the second largest marketer of natural gas in Georgia, serving more than 425,000 customers. SCANA Energy also had a regulated unit, SCANA Energy Regulated Division, selected by the Georgia Public Service Commission to serve as the state’s only regulated natural gas provider.

PSNC Energy (Public Service North Carolina Energy) is a regulated public utility engaged primarily in purchasing, transporting, distributing and selling natural gas to approximately 563,000 customers in a service area encompassing approximately 12,000 square miles (31,000 km^{2}) in 28 counties of North Carolina. Its headquarters is in Gastonia, North Carolina.
