= Parr Reservoir =

Reservoir in South Carolina

- Parr Shoals Reservoir
- Location within South Carolina Location within the United States
- Location: Fairfield / Newberry counties, South Carolina, United States
- Coordinates: 34°15′35″N 081°20′02″W
- Type: reservoir
- Primary inflows: Broad River (Carolinas)
- Primary outflows: Broad River (Carolinas)
- Basin countries: United States
- Max. length: 9 mi (14 km)
- Max. width: 1.5 mi (2.4 km)
- Surface area: 4,400 acres (1,800 ha)
- Surface elevation: 266 ft (81 m)
- Settlements: Peak, South Carolina

Parr Reservoir or Parr Shoals Reservoir is an impoundment of the Broad River in Pomaria, South Carolina. It is the last dam on the Broad River before the river reaches Columbia, South Carolina, and the Columbia Canal. The lake is mainly used as a holding pond of sorts, as the water is pulled in and out and used to cool the turbines of a nearby nuclear power plant. Some anglers will fish for catfish in the main river channel, while bass fishing is mainly held back to Heller's and Cannon's creeks, as well as the tailrace below Lake Monticello.

== See also ==
- List of lakes in South Carolina
