= Lake Bowen =

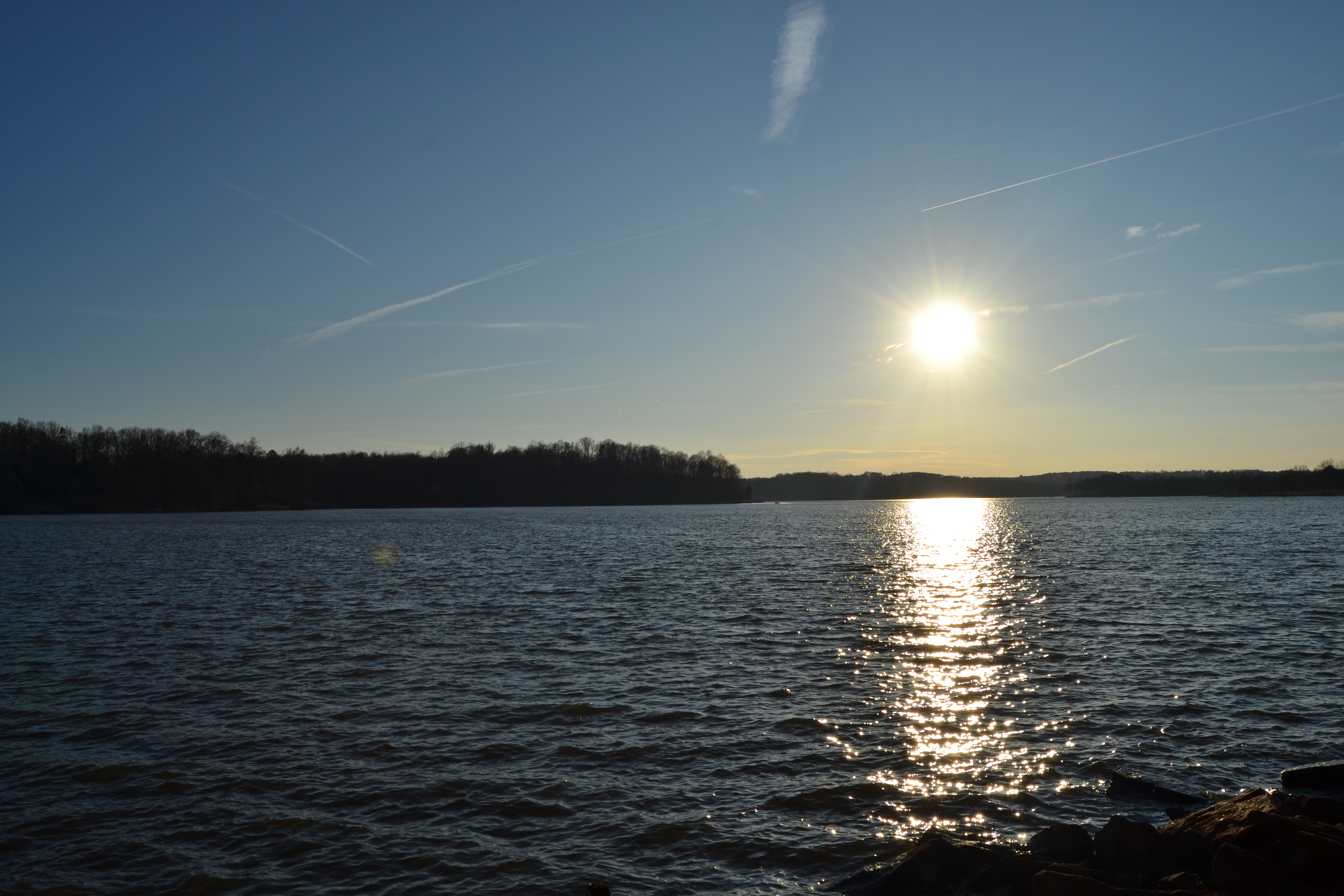
- Sunset at Lake Bowen

- Location within South Carolina
- Location: Spartanburg County, South Carolina, United States
- Coordinates: 35°06′43″N 82°02′30.9″W
- Type: reservoir
- Primary inflows: South Pacolet River
- Basin countries: United States
- Surface area: 1,534 acres (621 ha)
- Max. depth: 41 ft (12 m)
- Shore length^{1}: 33 miles (53 km)
- Surface elevation: 815 ft (248 m)
- Settlements: Boiling Springs, Inman, Chesnee
- ^{1} Shore length is not a well-defined measure.

Lake Bowen or Lake William C. Bowen is a 1,534-acre (621 ha) reservoir in northern Spartanburg County, South Carolina, 6 miles (10 km) from the North Carolina border. The Interstate 26 bridge crosses over Lake Bowen between exits 5 and 10 on Interstate 26. The lake stretches parallel to South Carolina Highway 11. It is the largest lake in Spartanburg County with 33 miles (53 km) of shoreline. The lake is formed by the waters of the South Pacolet River to serve as a public drinking water supply. Rules and regulations were adopted for recreational activities like boating and fishing. There are picnic pavilions, boat ramps, and a playground near the lake. Fish from the lake is safe to eat.

== Gallery ==
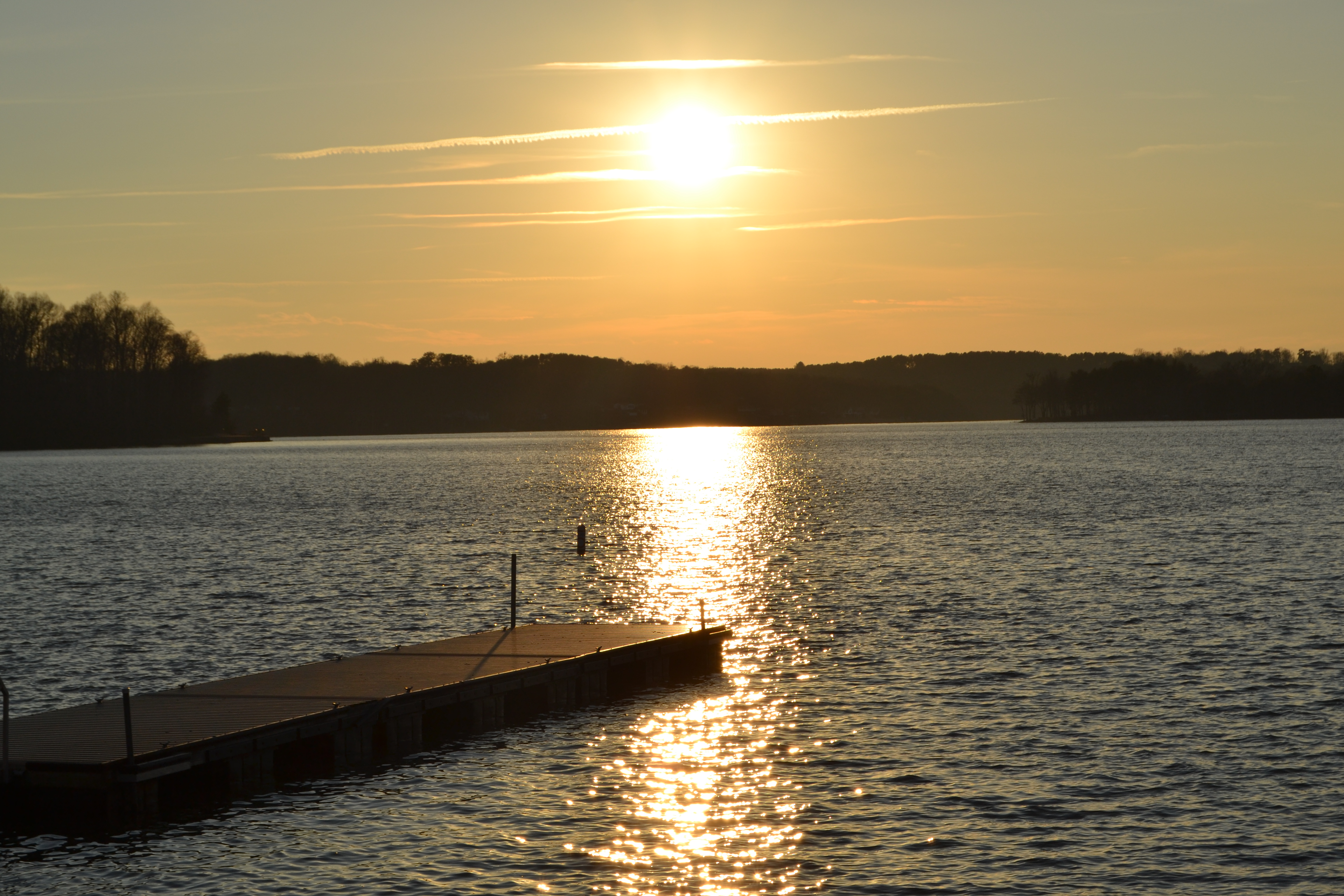
Fish from the lake is safe to eat.

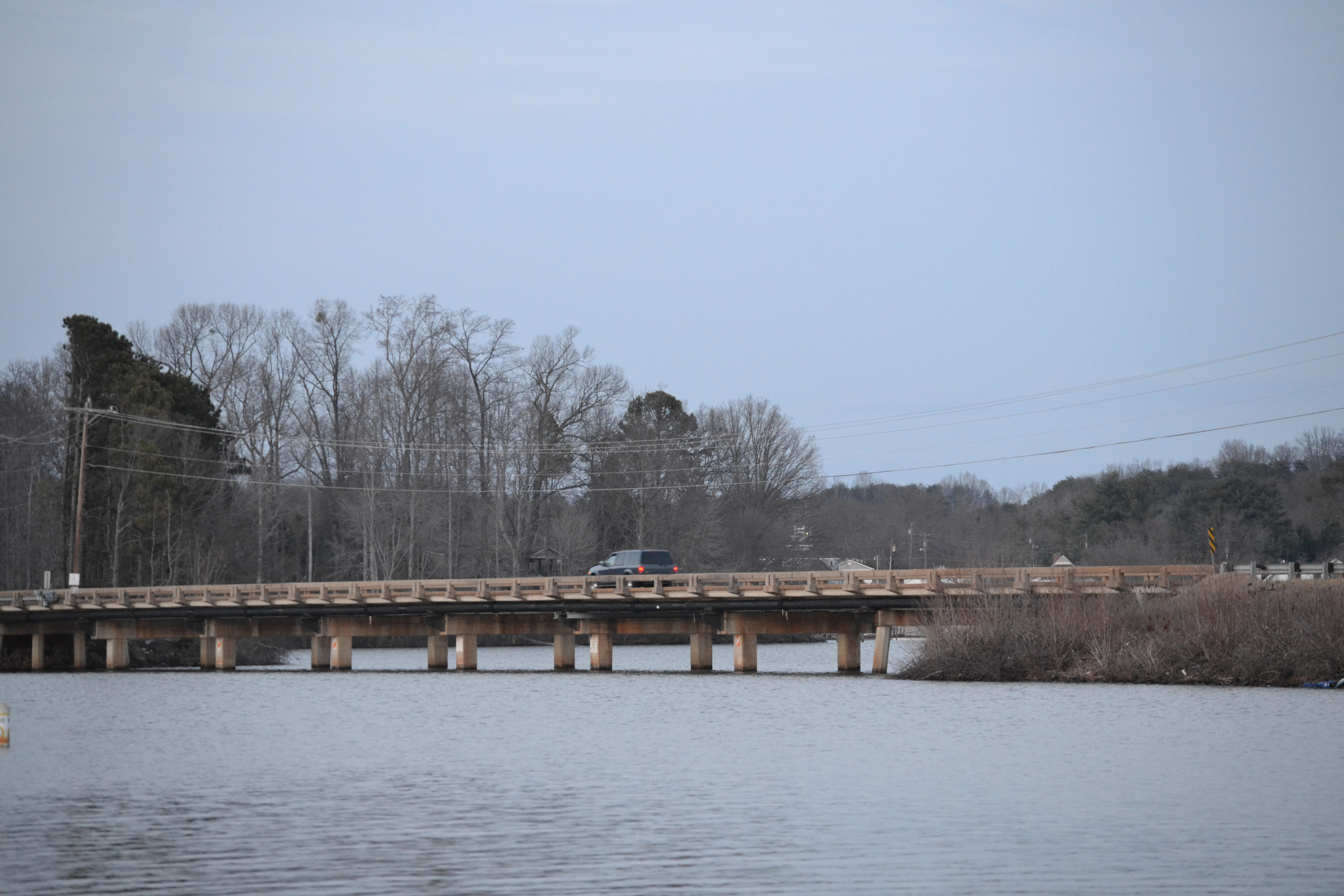
SC Hwy 9 bridge in Inman, SC

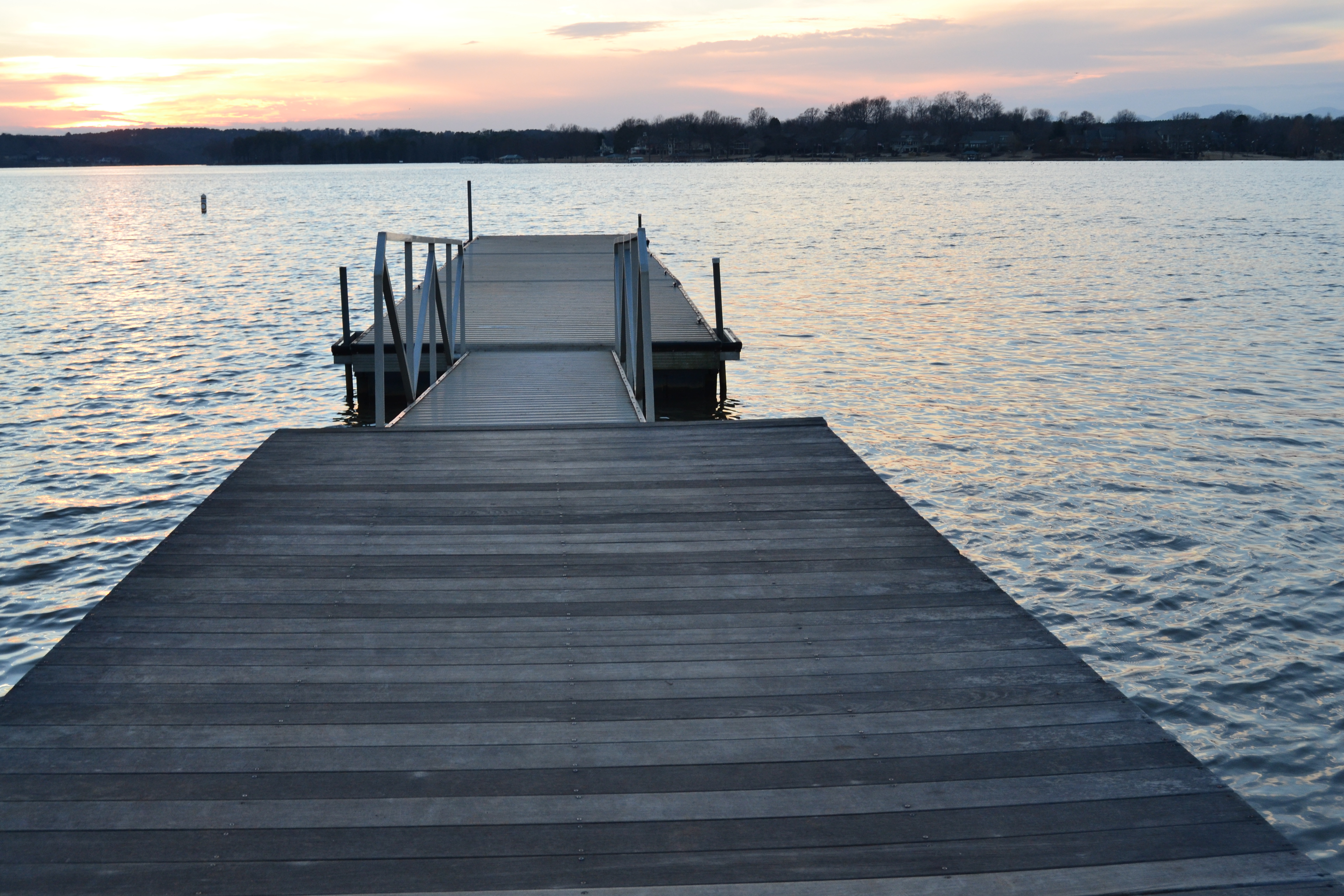
There are boat ramps, and a playground near the lake.

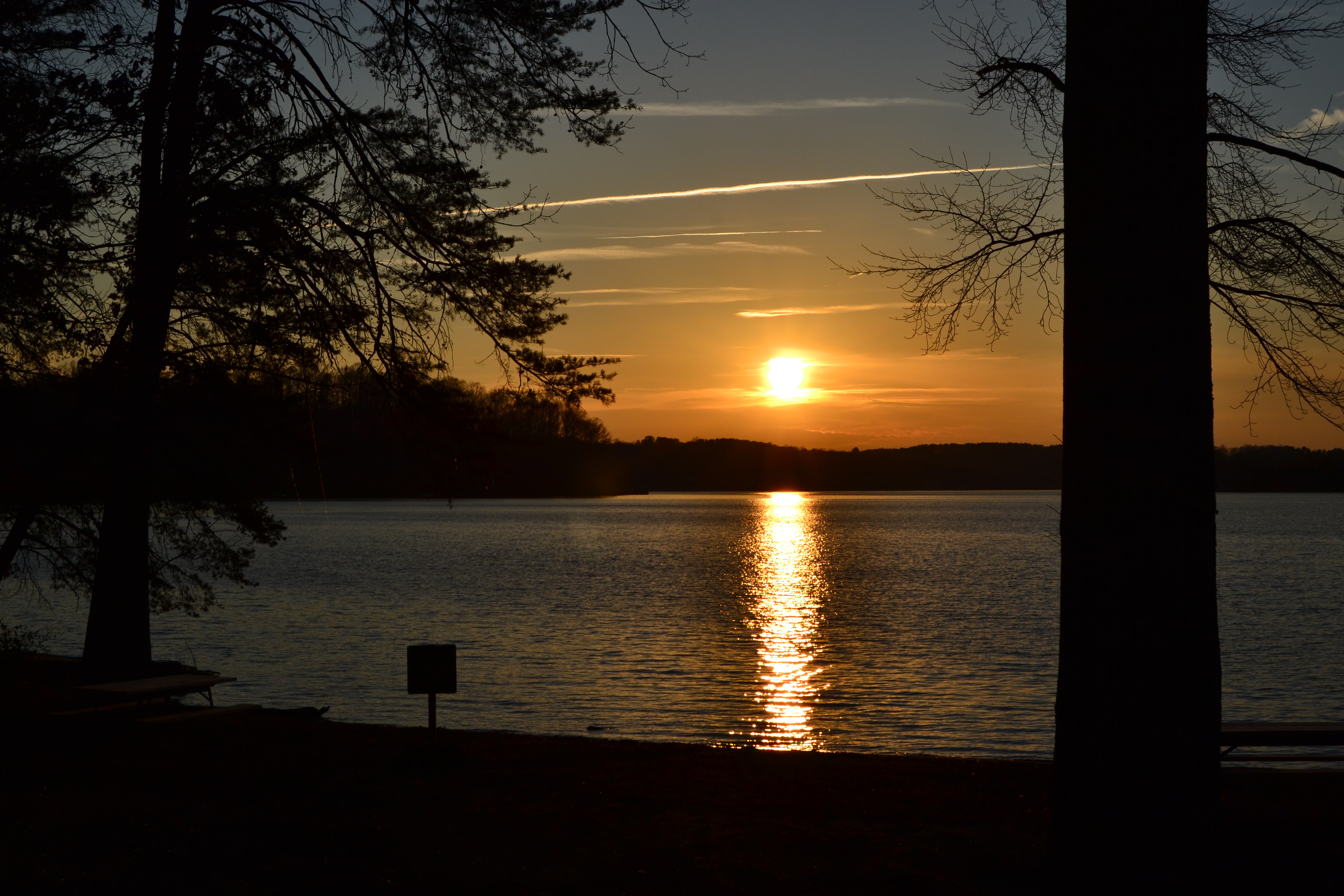
The lake is formed by the waters of the South Pacolet River to serve as a public drinking water supply.

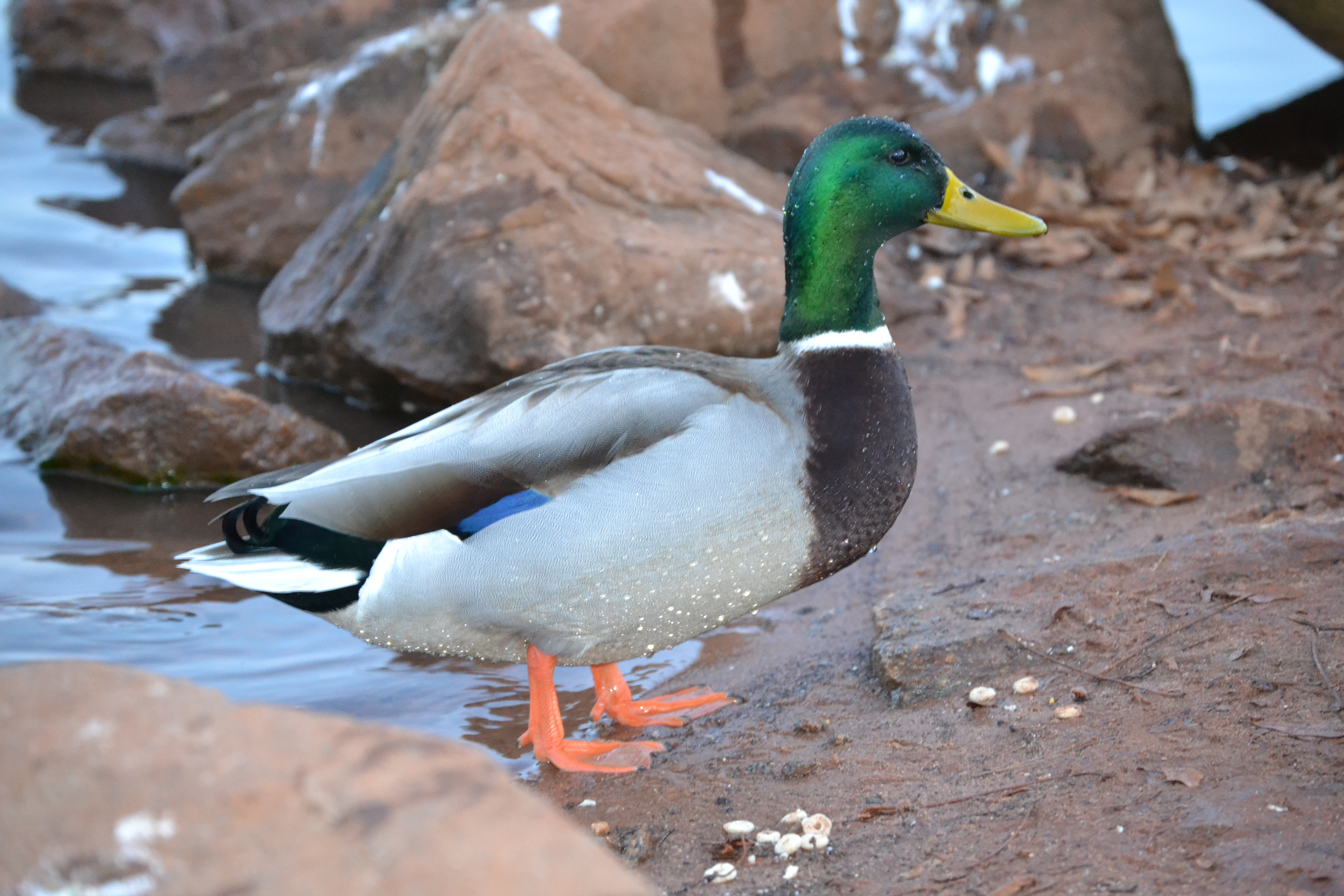
Abundance of wildlife around Lake Bowen.

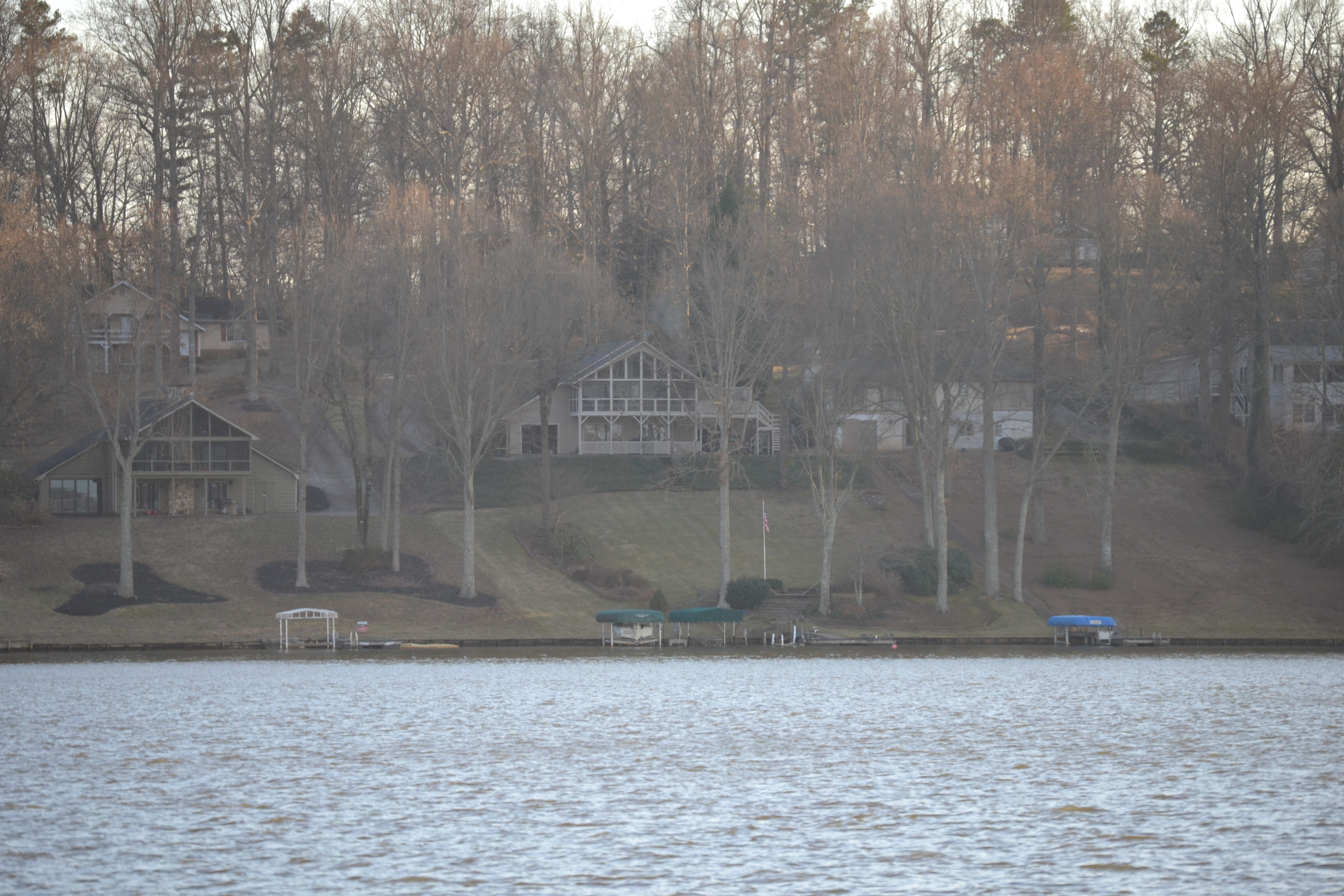
Some areas are developed real estate.

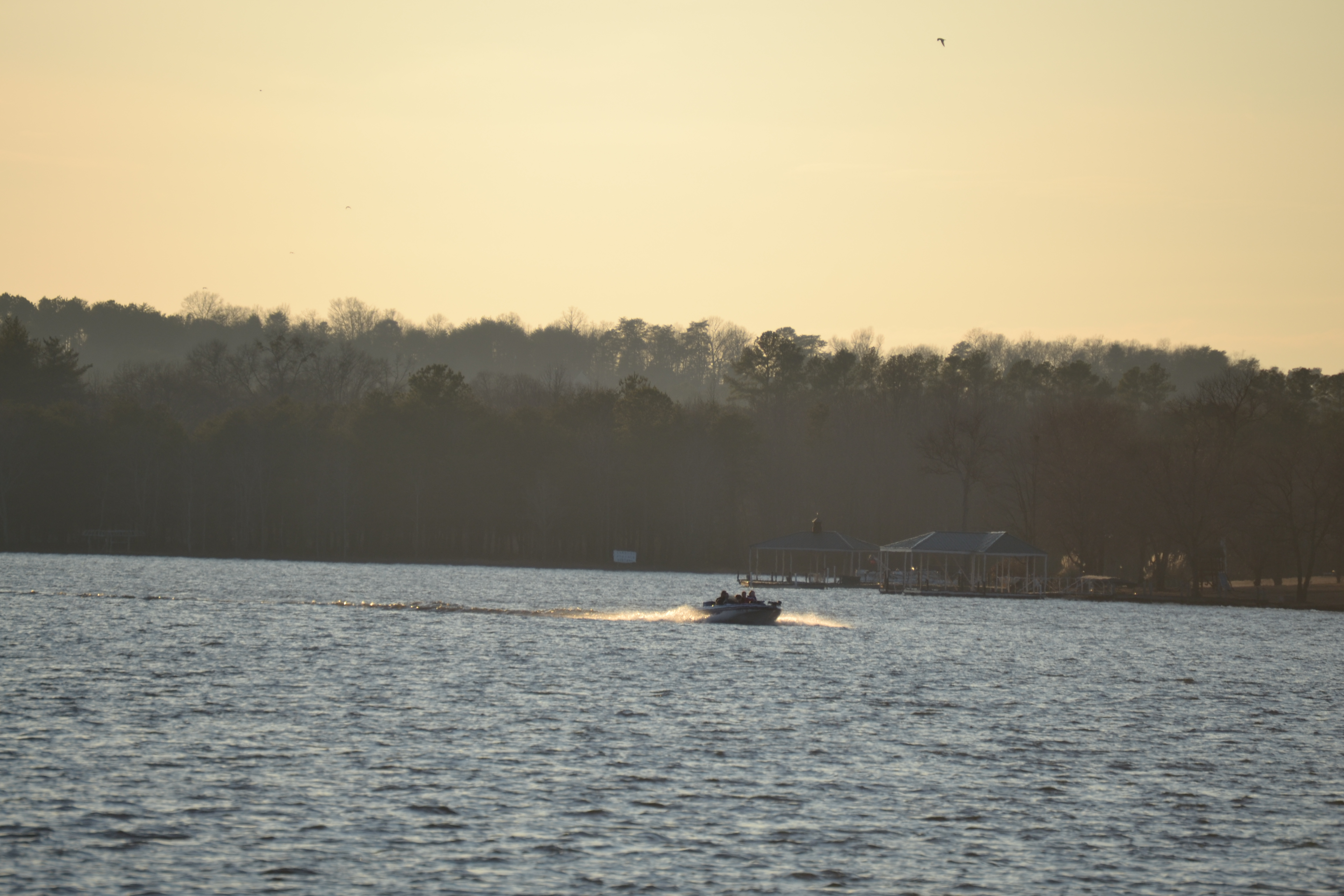
Rules and regulations were adopted for recreational activities like boating and fishing.

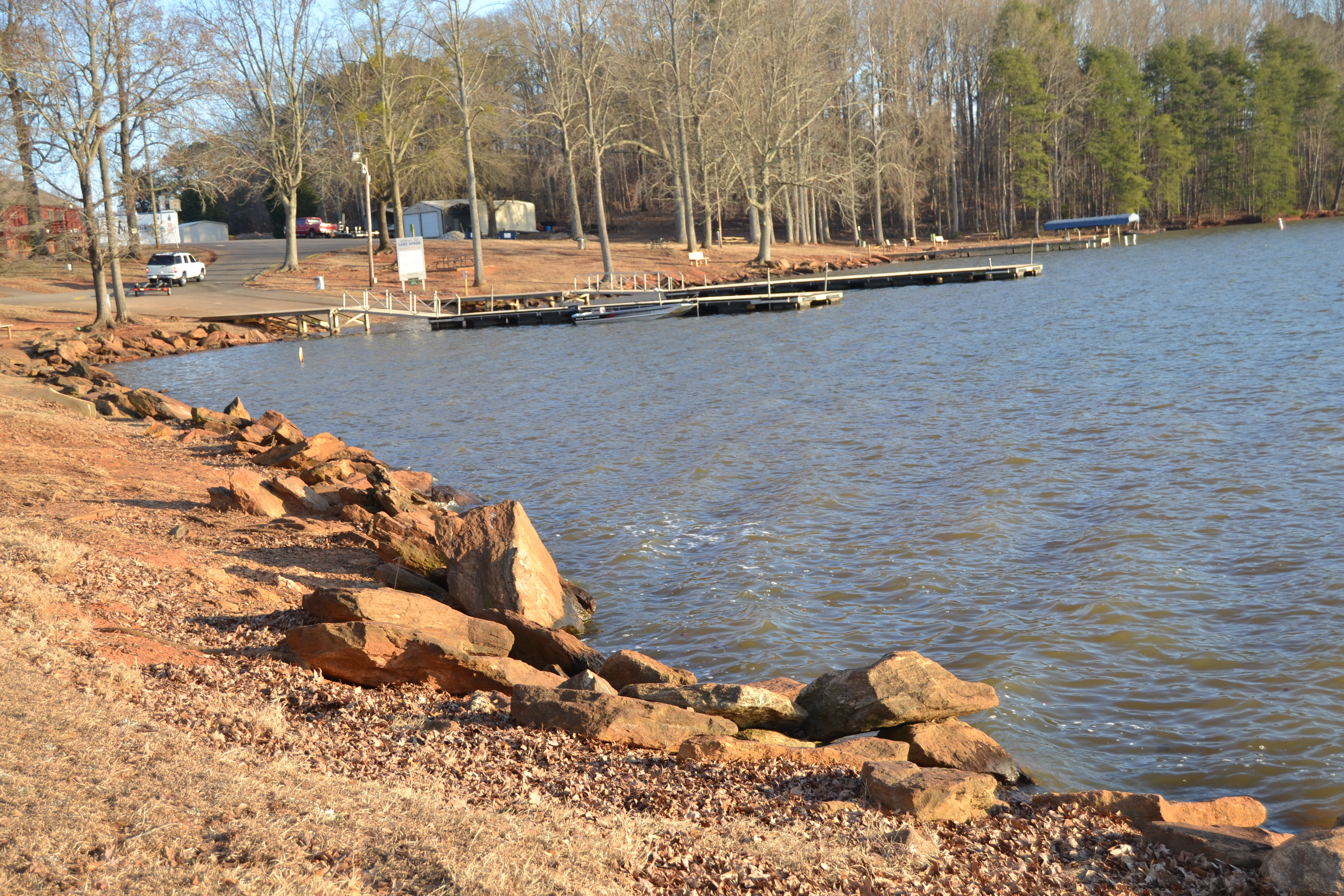
It is a 1,534-acre (621 ha) reservoir in Spartanburg County, South Carolina, with 33 miles (53 km) of shoreline.
