= Edvard Tchivzhel =

Latvian conductor

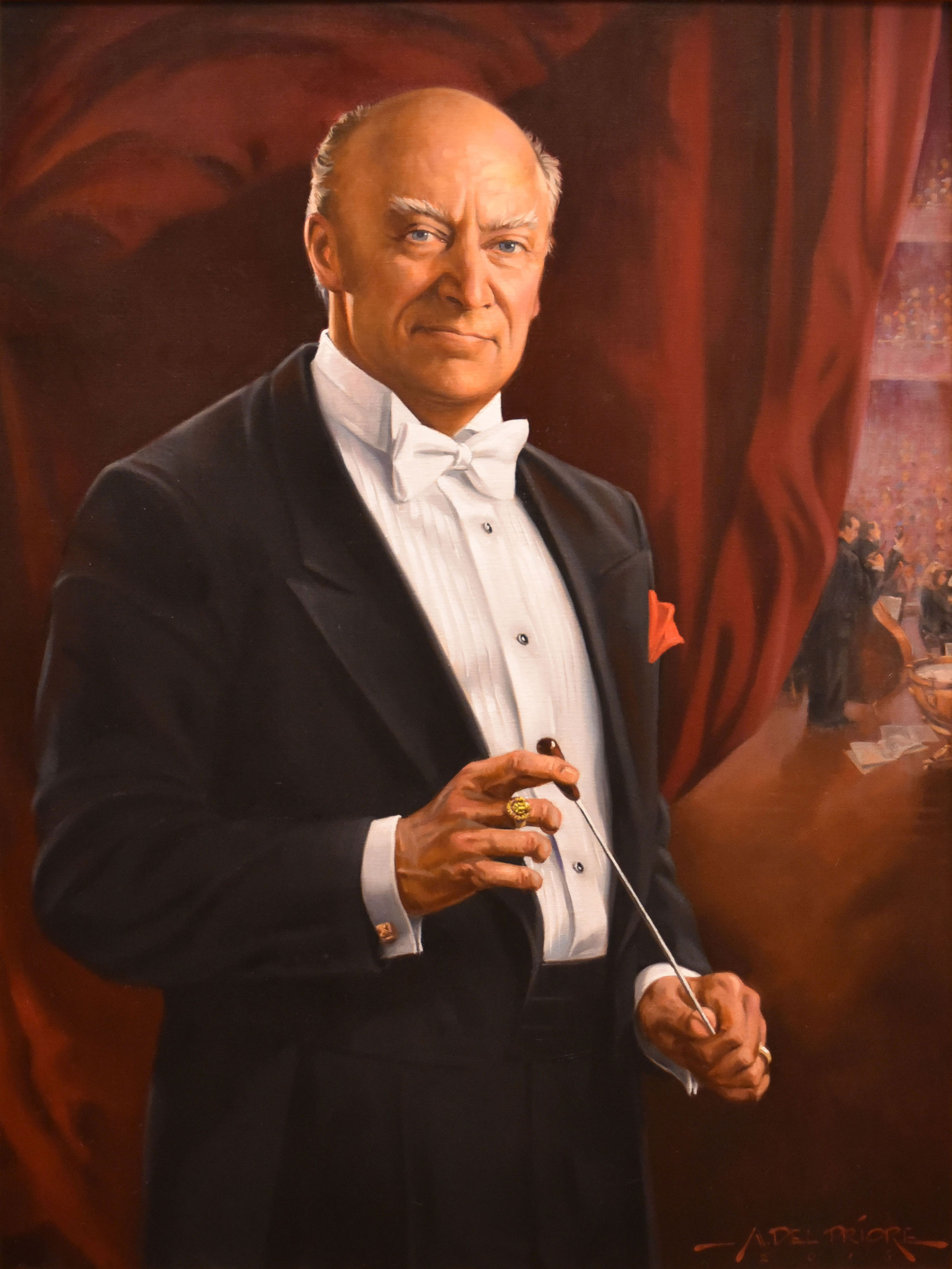
Portrait of Tchivzhel

Edvard Tchivzhel (Latvian: Edvards Čivželis) (pronounced CHIV-zhel) (b. January 29, 1944) is a Latvian-born conductor and music director of the Greenville Symphony Orchestra], Greenville, South Carolina.

== Early life ==
Edvard Tchivzhel was born into a musical family in Leningrad, USSR (today St. Petersburg, Russia). He graduated from the prestigious Leningrad Conservatory, which produced notable alumni such as Jascha Heifetz, Mariss Jansons, Sergei Prokofiev, Sergei Rachmaninoff, Dmitri Shostakovich, Vladimir Sofronitsky, Yuri Temirkanov, and Pyotr Ilyich Tchaikovsky, with degrees in piano and conducting. He then completed three years of postgraduate study under Latvian conductor, Arvid Jansons (father of Mariss Jansons). Tchivzhel was the winner of the Third Soviet Conductor's Competition in Moscow, while still a student.

== Career ==
Tchivzhel was assistant conductor to conductor Yevgeny Mravinsky with the St. Petersburg Philharmonic Orchestra from 1974 until 1977. He was also the permanent guest conductor of the St. Petersburg Philharmonic and has frequently conducted the Moscow Philharmonic, the Moscow Radio Symphony Orchestra, the Kirov Theatre of Opera and Ballet (now the Mariinsky Theatre) as well as other orchestras in the former Soviet Union. He served as associate conductor of the USSR State Symphony Orchestra, led by Evgeny Svetlanov.

In 1991, during a month-long tour with USSR State Symphony, Tchivzhel told his host in Greenville, South Carolina, that he wanted to defect to the United States. To insure that he would have a better chance at receiving political asylum, a local attorney arranged for him to make uncomplimentary public comments about the Soviet Union to an obscure agricultural newsletter. When the symphony left from its last stop in Washington, D.C., to return to Moscow, Tchivzel was whisked away by armed FBI and Immigration and Naturalization Services agents. He and his wife became U.S. citizens in 1999. At each symphony performance in Greenville, he faces the audience to conduct “The Star-Spangled Banner.”

=== International conducting ===
Tchivzhel has conducted outside of the Soviet Union since the 1980s. He has performed in England, Germany, the Czech Republic, Poland, Romania, Scandinavia, Australia and New Zealand. He also served as artistic advisor for the Auckland Philharmonia. In 1986, he became the chief conductor of the Umeå Sinfonietta, Sweden, and frequently performed with the symphony orchestras of Helsinborg, Malmö and Norrköping.

Tchivzhel has recently performed in Venezuela (2002), with the Orquestra Sinfonica del Estado in Mexico in commemoration of the victory in World War II (2005), with the Orquestra Sinfónica Brasileira in Rio de Janeiro (2004, 2007). He performed with the Extremadura Symphony Orchestra, Spain (2006, 2008) and in Romania (2008).

=== American conducting ===
Tchivzhel has debuted with the Baltimore Symphony (MD), the Indianapolis Symphony (IN) and the Grand Rapids Symphony (MI). He made his debut with the Dayton Opera in 2008. Tchivzhel is known to conduct the Star-Spangled Banner at the beginning of his concerts. On July 4, 2026, Tchivzhel was invited to conduct the Star-Spangled Banner at the National Mall in Washington DC to commemorate America's 250 years of independence.

=== Music Director ===
He has held permanent positions as music director with the Karelian Symphony Orchestra of National Television and Radio (1973–1991), the Atlantic Sinfonietta (1992–1994), a small chamber orchestra in New York, the Fort Wayne Philharmonic Orchestra (1993–2008) and the Greenville Symphony Orchestra (1999–present). He also serves as distinguished visiting professor at Furman University (Greenville, SC).
