= Lera Auerbach =

Russian-born American composer and pianist

- Born: October 21, 1973 (age 52); Chelyabinsk, Soviet Union
- Citizenship: Soviet (formerly), Austria, United States
- Education: Manhattan School of Music; Juilliard School; Hochschule für Musik Hannover
- Occupations: Classical composer and conductor

Lera Auerbach (Russian: Лера Авербах, born Valeria Lvovna Averbakh, Russian: Валерия Львовна Авербах; October 21, 1973) is a Soviet-born Austrian-American classical composer, conductor and concert pianist.

== Early life and education ==
Auerbach was born to a Russian-Jewish family in Chelyabinsk, a city in the Ural Mountains. Her mother was a piano teacher, many of whose ancestors had also been musicians. Lera began composing her own music at an early age; she later told an interviewer, "I was born to do this, to work in art... I had this feeling when I was four and I had it when I came to New York...". She received permission to visit the United States on a concert tour in 1991; although she spoke no English, after the collapse of the Soviet Union, she decided to stay in the country to pursue her musical career. She graduated from New York's Juilliard School in piano (under Joseph Kalichstein) and composition (under Milton Babbitt and Robert Beaser). Her graduate studies were supported by The Paul & Daisy Soros Fellowships for New Americans. She also studied comparative literature at Columbia University and earned a piano diploma at the Hochschule für Musik Hannover.

== Performances ==
Auerbach made her Carnegie Hall debut in May 2002, performing her own Suite for Violin, Piano and Orchestra with violinist Gidon Kremer conducting the Kremerata Baltica. She has appeared as solo pianist at such venues as the Great Concert Hall of the Moscow Conservatory, Tokyo Opera City, Lincoln Center, Herkulessaal, Oslo konserthus, Chicago's Theodore Thomas Orchestra Hall and the Kennedy Center.

== Compositions ==
Auerbach's compositions have been commissioned and performed by a wide array of artists, orchestras, choirs and ballet companies including Gidon Kremer, the Kremerata Baltica, David Finckel, Wu Han, Vadim Gluzman, the Tokyo, Kuss, Parker and Petersen String Quartets, the SWR and NDR symphony orchestras, Berg Orchestra, Netherlands Chamber Choir, RIAS Kammerchor, and the Royal Danish Ballet. Auerbach's music has also been commissioned by and performed at Caramoor International Music Festival, Lucerne Festival, Lockenhaus Festival, Bremen Musikfest and Schleswig-Holstein Musik Festival.

A commission by The Royal Danish Ballet, to celebrate Hans Christian Andersen's bicentenary in 2005, was Lera Auerbach's second collaboration with choreographer John Neumeier. The ballet is a modern rendition of the classic fairy tale The Little Mermaid and was premiered in April 2005 at the then newly opened Copenhagen Opera House.

Her Double Concerto for Violin, Piano and Orchestra, Op. 40, was written in 1997, but not premiered until December 15, 2006, in Stuttgart by the Stuttgart Radio Symphony Orchestra conducted by Andrey Boreyko; the soloists were violinist Vadim Gluzman and pianist Angela Yoffe. The American premiere was on February 13, 2010, by the Fort Wayne Philharmonic Orchestra conducted by Andrew Constantine; the soloists were violinist Jennifer Koh and pianist Benjamin Hochman.

In 2007, her Symphony No. 1 "Chimera" received its world premiere by the Düsseldorf Symphony. Other 2007 premieres included Symphony No. 2 "Requiem for a Poet" by Hannover's NDR Radio Philharmonic, as well as A Russian Requiem (on Russian Orthodox sacred texts and poetry by Alexander Pushkin, Gavrila Derzhavin, Mikhail Lermontov, Boris Pasternak, Osip Mandelstam, Alexander Blok, Zinaida Gippius, Anna Akhmatova, Joseph Brodsky, Viktor Sosnora and Irina Ratushinskaya) by the Bremen Philharmonic with the Latvian National Choir and the Estonian Opera Boys Choir.

Vienna's historic Theater an der Wien debuted Auerbach's full-length opera based on her original play Gogol in November 2011.

Auerbach's a cappella opera The Blind (based on a play by Maurice Maeterlinck) was performed in a controversial new production by John La Bouchardière at Lincoln Center for Performing Arts, New York, in July 2013, throughout which the entire audience was blindfolded. Auerbach stated, "The message is that we are the blind. With all our means of communications, we see each other less and connect less. We have less understanding and compassion for other people. We have this screen between us." In a Gramophone article on Auerbach, 24 Preludes for piano (1999) is listed as her breakthrough piece, Sogno di Stabat Mater (2007) is described as one of her "most direct and striking compositions", and her score for John Neumeier's adaptation of The Little Mermaid is praised as "vivid". Her 2018 piece Labyrinth was praised by Joshua Kosman as "a formidable and richly textured addition to the piano literature". Her 2019 piece Arctica also garnered acclaim.

== Awards and recognition ==
In 2005 Auerbach received the Hindemith Prize from the Schleswig-Holstein Musik Festival. In the same year she received the Förderpreis Deutschlandfunk and the Bremer Musikfest Prize; she was composer-in-residence in Bremen.

In 2003, she was the youngest composer to be represented by music publisher Internationale Musikverlage Hans Sikorski of Hamburg, Germany.

In 2007, she was selected as a member of the forum of Young Global Leaders by the World Economic Forum in Davos, Switzerland.

== Works ==
=== Main orchestral works ===
- 2007: Russian Requiem
- 2008: Fragile Solitudes, Shadowbox for String Quartet and orchestra
- 2010: Eterniday, for bass drum, celesta and Strings
- 2012: Post Silentium, for orchestra

==== Concerto ====
- 1997–98: Piano Concerto No. 1, Op. 39
  1. Part 1) River of Loss, Dialogue with Time, Wind of Oblivion
  2. Part 2) Dialogue with Time (can be performed separately as an orchestral piece with the piano being part of the orchestra)
- 1997: Double Concerto for violin, piano and orchestra, Op. 40
- 2000 (2003): Violin Concerto No. 1, Op. 56
- 2001: Suite Concertante for violin, piano and Strings, Op. 60
- 2002: Serenade for a Melancholic Sea, for violin, cello, piano and String orchestra, Op. 68
- 2004: Violin Concerto No. 2 in one movement, Op. 77
- 2005: Dreams and Whispers of Poseidon, symphonic poem
- 2017: Violin Concerto No. 4 (NYx) (David Geffen Hall), Leonidas Kavakos (violin), New York Philharmonic, Alan Gilbert
- 2021: Cello Concerto, Diary of a Madman

==== Symphony ====
- 2006: Symphony No. 1 Chimera, for large orchestra (last two movements can be performed separately as symphonic poem Icarus)
- 2006: Symphony No. 2 Requiem for a Poet, for mezzo-soprano, cello, choir and orchestra
- 2013: Memoria de la Luz, String Symphony No. 1 (Arrangement of the String Quartet No. 2 Primera Luz)
- 2016: Symphony No. 3 The Infant Minstrel and His Peculiar Menagerie, for violin, choir and orchestra

=== Main choral works ===
- 72 Angels, for choir and saxophone quartet
- Goetia 72, in umbra lucis, for choir and string quartet

== Recordings ==
- Sonata for Violoncello and Piano, op. 69 (2002) (ArtistLed 11001–2)
- 24 Preludes for Violin and Piano, Op. 46 (BIS 2003)
- Tolstoy's Waltz (BIS 2004)
- Auerbach plays Mozart (ARABESQUE 2005)
- Ballet for a Lonely Violinist, Op. 70 (BIS 2005, Feminae 2016)
- Preludes and Dreams containing 24 Preludes for piano, Op.41; Ten Dreams, Op.45 and Chorale, Fugue and Postlude, Op.31(BIS 2006)
- Cetera Desunt, String Quartet No. 3 (CAPRICCIO 2006)
- Flight and Fire (PROFIL – Hänssler Classics 2007)
- Sogno di Stabat Mater (2005, rev. 2009) (Nonesuch Records 287228–2)
- Celloquy containing 24 Preludes for Violoncello and Piano, Op. 47 and Sonata for Violoncello and Piano, Op. 69 (Cedille Records 2013)
- T'filah (Feminae 2016)
- 72 Angels for choir and saxophone quartet (Alpha593 2019)
- Milking Darkness (Challenge Classics 2023)
