= Wyche Pavilion =

Historic building in downtown Greenville, South Carolina

- U.S. National Register of Historic Places
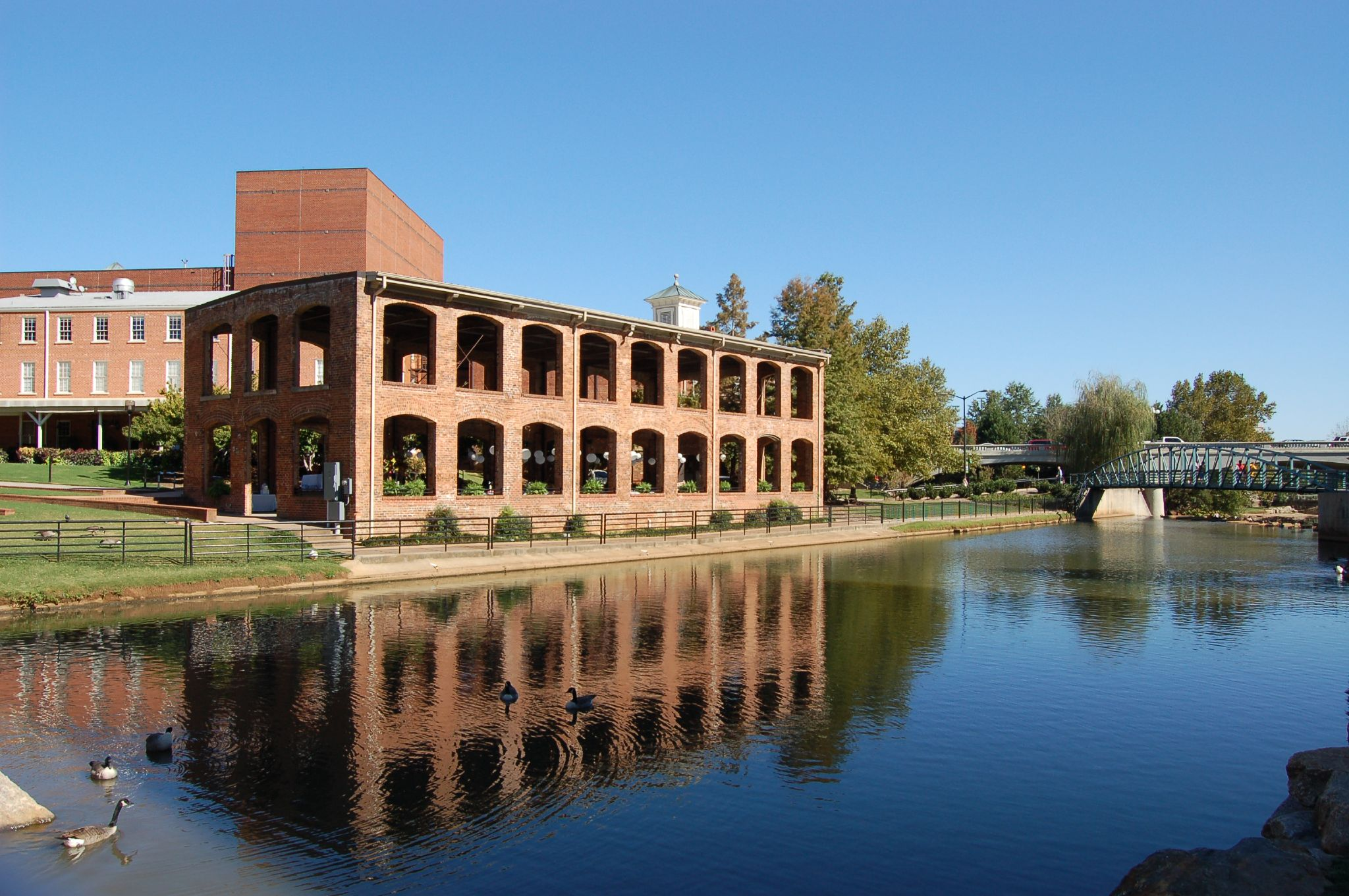
- Wyche Pavilion, 2007

- Location within South Carolina Location within the United States
- Location: 300 S Main St, Greenville, South Carolina 29601
- Coordinates: 34°50′48.2″N 82°24′06.5″W
- Area: less than one acre
- Built: 1904
- NRHP reference No.: 79002383
- Added to NRHP: January 14, 1979

The Wyche Pavilion is the two-story, open-air shell of a historic building in downtown Greenville, South Carolina, used in the 21st century as an event venue. As part of the Reedy River Industrial District, the building was listed in the National Register of Historic Places on January 14, 1979.

The brick structure was built in 1904 by noted Greenville engineer and industrial architect Joseph Emory Sirrine (1872–1947) with large windows of the same size on both floors, a flat roof, and a cupola at its center. The building was intended as a paint shop for the adjacent Greenville Coach Factory, but with the coming of the automobile, the owners of the coach factory sold the business in 1911. In 1925, the building became the home of Duke's Mayonnaise, a successful enterprise created by Greenville resident Eugenia Thomas Slade Duke (1881–1968).

The building was virtually abandoned by 1958 and had fallen into disrepair before it was purchased in the 1980s by the Peace Center, a Greenville performing arts complex, which initially intended to restore the building. After financial constraints prevented the remodeling, the building was gutted, turned into an open-air pavilion, and named for Tommy Wyche (1926–2015) and his wife Harriet, leaders in the transformation of downtown Greenville. In 2019, following the development of Falls Park, the Peace Center proposed to install windows, doors, and HVAC equipment in order to transform the building into "a fully-functioning performance venue, featuring state of the art sound and lighting". Despite two design proposals, the second of which included a recommendation by city planners, Greenville's Design Review Board rejected the Peace Center plans by a vote of 3–2.
