= C. Thomas Wyche =

Cyril Thomas "Tommy" Wyche (1926 – January 23, 2015) was a lawyer, conservationist, and a leader in the transformation of downtown Greenville, South Carolina.

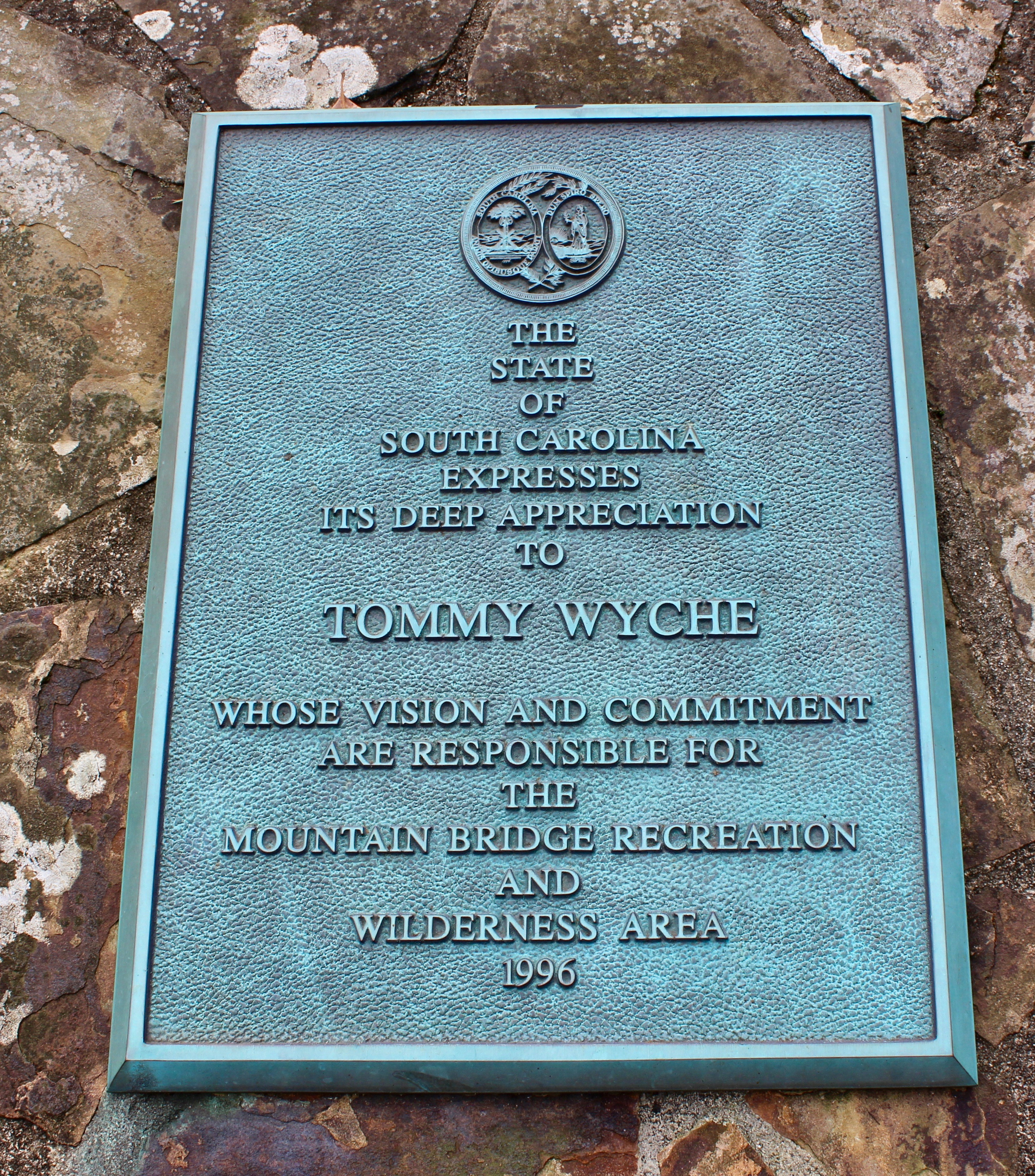
Commemorative plaque honoring Wyche, Caesars Head State Park, Greenville County, South Carolina.

== Early life ==
Wyche was born in Greenville, graduated from Yale University in 1946, and received his law degree from the University of Virginia in 1949.

== Conservationism ==
In 1973 Wyche founded Naturaland Trust, a vehicle for his successful attempt to protect the South Carolina Blue Ridge Mountains. He was a principal author of the South Carolina Heritage Trust Act, the South Carolina Conservation Easement Act, and the South Carolina Mountain Protection Act. His efforts resulted in the protection of over 100,000 acres, including Jocassee Gorges, the watersheds of Table Rock and Poinsett Reservoir, and the land between them, which Wyche named Mountain Bridge Wilderness Area and which include Jones Gap and Caesars Head State Parks. An avid outdoor photographer, Wyche published six books that featured his work, including South Carolina's Mountain Wilderness: The Blue Ridge Escarpment (Englewood, CO: Westcliffe, 1994).

== City development ==
Wyche also had the foresight to promote the rejuvenation of downtown Greenville, which during his early career was in serious economic decline. Working with Mayor Max Heller and business leader Buck Mickel, Wyche helped bring a Hyatt Regency Hotel to Greenville in the early 1980s, thus jump-starting Main Street redevelopment. Wyche was also a prime mover in the development of the Peace Center, Heritage Green, the Bi-Lo Center (now the Bon Secours Wellness Arena), and the Governor's School for the Arts and Humanities. Wyche, a longtime supporter of the Greenville Symphony Orchestra, was also a pianist and occasional composer. After Wyche's death Edvard Tchivzhel, the orchestra's musical director, arranged and premiered for full orchestra a short piano piece Wyche had written.

== Honors and legacy ==
In 1996, Gov. David Beasley presented Wyche with the Order of the Palmetto. In 2012, a carillon created by van Bergen Bells was dedicated to Wyche in honor of his contributions to the city of Greenville. After Wyche's death in 2015, his longtime colleague Frank Holleman called him "the single most important conservationist in the Upstate, one of the most important people in the state in conservation, and one of a handful of people who made the center of Greenville what it is today."
