= Discover Russian =

Discover Russian (DR) was the first Russian television program on the Pacific coast of North America. It was produced by Pamirus Production under the direction of producer and presenter Nathalie Potocka. In 38 episodes, this cultural variety show featured interviews with prominent people from various disciplines, including:

- artists
- dancers
- musicians
- hockey players; and
- figure skaters

Some of the guests on Discover Russian included:

- maestro Mstislav Rostropovich
- ballerina Evelyn Hart
- pianist Gregory Sokolov
- violinist Vadim Gluzman
- legendary figure skater Alexei Yagudin
- conductor Bramwell Tovey
- Alexander Pushkin
- Peter Tchaikowsky
- Sergey Rachmaninoff; and
- Nicolas Rimsky-Korsakov

The program also featured a series dedicated to great Russian writers and intelligentsia, Anton Chekhov, Fyodor Dostoevsky and Mikhail Bulgakov. The program also hosted a number of interviews with local and international political and religious leaders.
