= Enigma Variations discography =

Edward Elgar's Enigma Variations has received more than sixty recordings since the first version, recorded under the baton of the composer in 1924. The first two recordings were made by the old acoustic process. Following the introduction of the microphone and electrical recording in 1925, Elgar re-recorded the work, taking advantage of the greatly increased realism of the new process. New recordings of the Variations were later made following the introduction of the long playing record in the early 1950s, and after the introduction of stereophonic recording towards the end of the decade. Details of the recordings, below, are taken from The Gramophone.

Conductor	Orchestra	Label	Date
The composer	untitled	His Master's Voice	1924
Sir Henry Wood	New Queen's Hall	Columbia	1925
The composer	Royal Albert Hall	His Master's Voice	1927
Sir Hamilton Harty	Hallé	Columbia	1932
Arturo Toscanini	BBC Symphony	His Master's Voice	1935
Sir Henry Wood	Queen's Hall	Decca	1936
Sir Adrian Boult	BBC Symphony	His Master's Voice	1936
Malcolm Sargent	National Symphony	Decca	1945
John Barbirolli	Hallé	His Master's Voice	1948
Walter Goehr	Concert Hall Symphony	Nixa	1953
Sir Malcolm Sargent	London Symphony	Decca	1953
Sir Adrian Boult	London Philharmonic	His Master's Voice	1953
George Weldon	Philharmonia	Columbia	1954
Arturo Toscanini	NBC Symphony	RCA	1954
Sir Thomas Beecham	Royal Philharmonic	Philips	1955
Sir John Barbirolli	Hallé	Pye	1957
William Steinberg	Pittsburgh Symphony	Capitol Records	1957
Sir Malcolm Sargent	Philharmonia	His Master's Voice	1960
Pierre Monteux	London Symphony	RCA	1961
Sir Adrian Boult	London Philharmonic	World Record Club	1961
Pierre Monteux	London Symphony	BBC	1962
Sir John Barbirolli	Philharmonia	His Master's Voice	1963
Colin Davis	London Symphony	Philips	1965
Sir Malcolm Sargent	BBC Symphony	BBC	1966
Constantin Silvestri	Bournemouth Symphony	BBC	1967
Sir Adrian Boult	London Symphony	His Master's Voice	1970
Leopold Stokowski	Czech Philharmonic Orchestra	Decca	1972
Eugene Ormandy	Philadelphia	CBS	1972
Zubin Mehta	Los Angeles Philharmonic	Decca	1973
Norman Del Mar	Royal Philharmonic	Contour	1975
Eugen Jochum	London Symphony	DG	1975
Andrew Davis	New Philharmonia	Lyrita	1975
Bernard Haitink	London Philharmonic	Philips	1975
Sir Georg Solti	Chicago Symphony	Decca	1976
Daniel Barenboim	London Philharmonic	CBS	1976
Sir Charles Groves	Royal Liverpool Philharmonic	His Master's Voice	1978
Neville Marriner	Concertgebouw	Philips	1979
Sir Alexander Gibson	Scottish National	RCA	1979
Andrew Davis	Philharmonia	CBS	1983
Vernon Handley	London Philharmonic	EMI	1983
Leonard Bernstein	BBC Symphony	DG	1984
Sir Charles Mackerras	London Philharmonic	His Masters' Voice	1986
Yehudi Menuhin	Royal Philharmonic	Philips	1986
André Previn	Royal Philharmonic	Philips	1987
Andrew Litton	Royal Philharmonic	Virgin	1988
Barry Tuckwell	London Symphony	Pickwick	1989
Hilary Davan Wetton	London Philharmonic	Collins	1989
Bryden Thomson	London Philharmonic	Chandos	1989
William Boughton	English Symphony	Nimbus	1989
Leonard Slatkin	London Philharmonic	RCA	1989
Giuseppe Sinopoli	Philharmonia	DG	1989
David Zinman	Baltimore Symphony	Telarc	1989
Sir Edward Downes	BBC Philharmonic	Conifer	1991
Andrew Davis	BBC Symphony	Teldec	1991
Charles Dutoit	Montreal Symphony	Decca	1991
Sir Simon Rattle	City of Birmingham Symphony	EMI	1992
James Levine	Berlin Philharmonic	Sony	1992
Sir Neville Marriner	Academy of St Martin in the Fields	Capriccio	1993
Christopher Seaman	National Youth Orchestra of Great Britain	Classics	1993
Rolf Kleinert	Berlin Radio Symphony	Berlin Classics	1996
Sir Georg Solti	Vienna Philharmonic	Decca	1997
Adrian Leaper	Czecho-Slovak Radio Symphony	Naxos	1997
George Hurst	Bournemouth Symphony	Naxos	1998
Stanisław Skrowaczewski	Saarbrücken Radio Symphony	Arte Nova	1998
Paul Daniel	London Philharmonic	Classic FM	1999
Sir John Eliot Gardiner	Vienna Philharmonic	DG	2002
Sir Mark Elder	Hallé	Hallé	2003
Sakari Oramo	City of Birmingham Symphony	CBSO	2007
Sir Colin Davis	London Symphony	LSO Live	2007
Vladimir Ashkenazy	Sydney Symphony	Exton	2008
Sir Simon Rattle	Berliner Philharmoniker	EMI	2012
Andrew Constantine	BBC National Orchestra of Wales	Orchid Classics	2017
David Bernard	Park Avenue Chamber Symphony	Recursive Classics	2022
