= Rita McKinney =

American attorney

Rita McKinney is an American attorney who served as director of the South Carolina Department of Labor, Licensing and Regulation from 1999 to 2003. She was the first woman elected student body president at the University of South Carolina. McKinney joined McNair Law Firm as a partner in 1992 and became managing shareholder of its upstate unit in 2011. She also served as president of the Greenville County Bar Association and chair of the South Carolina Chamber of Commerce.

== Early life and education ==
Rita McKinney was born in Greenville, South Carolina and was raised there. She was one of four children. Her father was a journalist and a University of South Carolina graduate who had been the editor of The Gamecock as a student and later worked for the Greenville Piedmont and the Greenville News. Her mother was born and raised in New Zealand and later became a United States citizen.

McKinney enrolled at the University of South Carolina in fall 1970 and graduated in 1974. While at USC, she became involved in student government and was elected to the student senate during her sophomore year. She later became the first woman elected student body president at the university. Her campaign supported increased participation by students and faculty in university governance.

As student body president, McKinney advocated for a university governing body that included students, faculty, and administrators. January 1974 address to the student senate, she identified the introduction of student book exchange and funding for women's sports through student athletic fees as accomplishments of student government.

McKinney later attended law school in New England and earned a Juris Doctor from Northeastern University School of Law in Boston.

== Career ==
McKinney joined McNair Law Firm as a partner in 1992. Her legal practice included employment law, physician representation, business litigation, tax planning, estate planning, and corporate law. She also served as a law clerk for U.S. District Judge Matthew J. Perry.

From 1999 to 2003, McKinney served as director of the South Carolina Department of Labor, Licensing and Regulation. During her tenure, she recruited attorney J. Michelle Childs from private practice to serve as deputy director of the department's Division of Labor.

In 2011, she was elected managing shareholder of McNair's Upstate unit, overseeing the firm's Anderson and Greenville offices. She also served as president of the Greenville County Bar Association in 1993.

== Awards and recognition ==
McKinney was elected to membership in the American Law Institute. She was selected as a recipient of the 2012 South Carolina Lawyers Weekly Leadership in Law Award and was repeatedly named to The Best Lawyers in America.

== Community involvement and advocacy ==
McKinney has served in several professional and community leadership positions. She was chair of the South Carolina Chamber of Commerce board of directors and served on the University of South Carolina Board of Trustees, and the Columbia College Board of Visitors. She also served as secretary of the Greenville Symphony Board and a member of the South Carolina Bar Board of Governors.

In 2022, McKinney wrote a letter supporting Judge J. Michelle Childs's nomination to the U.S. Court of Appeals. She has also served as a board member of the Old Bristol Historical Society in Pemaquid, Maine.
