= Jones Gap State Park =

State park in Greenville County, South Carolina

- Location within South Carolina
- Nearest city: Marietta, SC
- Coordinates: 35°7′33″N 82°34′30″W
- Area: 3,964 acres (1,604 ha)
- Created: 1976–1989
- Operator: South Carolina Parks, Recreation, and Tourism
- Camp sites: trailside
- Website: South Carolina State Parks, Jones Gap State Park

Jones Gap State Park is a South Carolina state park in northern Greenville County, near Marietta. The 3,964-acre (1,604 ha) park, which includes the headwaters of the Middle Saluda River, is, with Caesars Head State Park, administered by the state Department of Parks, Recreation, and Tourism as part of the Mountain Bridge Wilderness.

== History ==
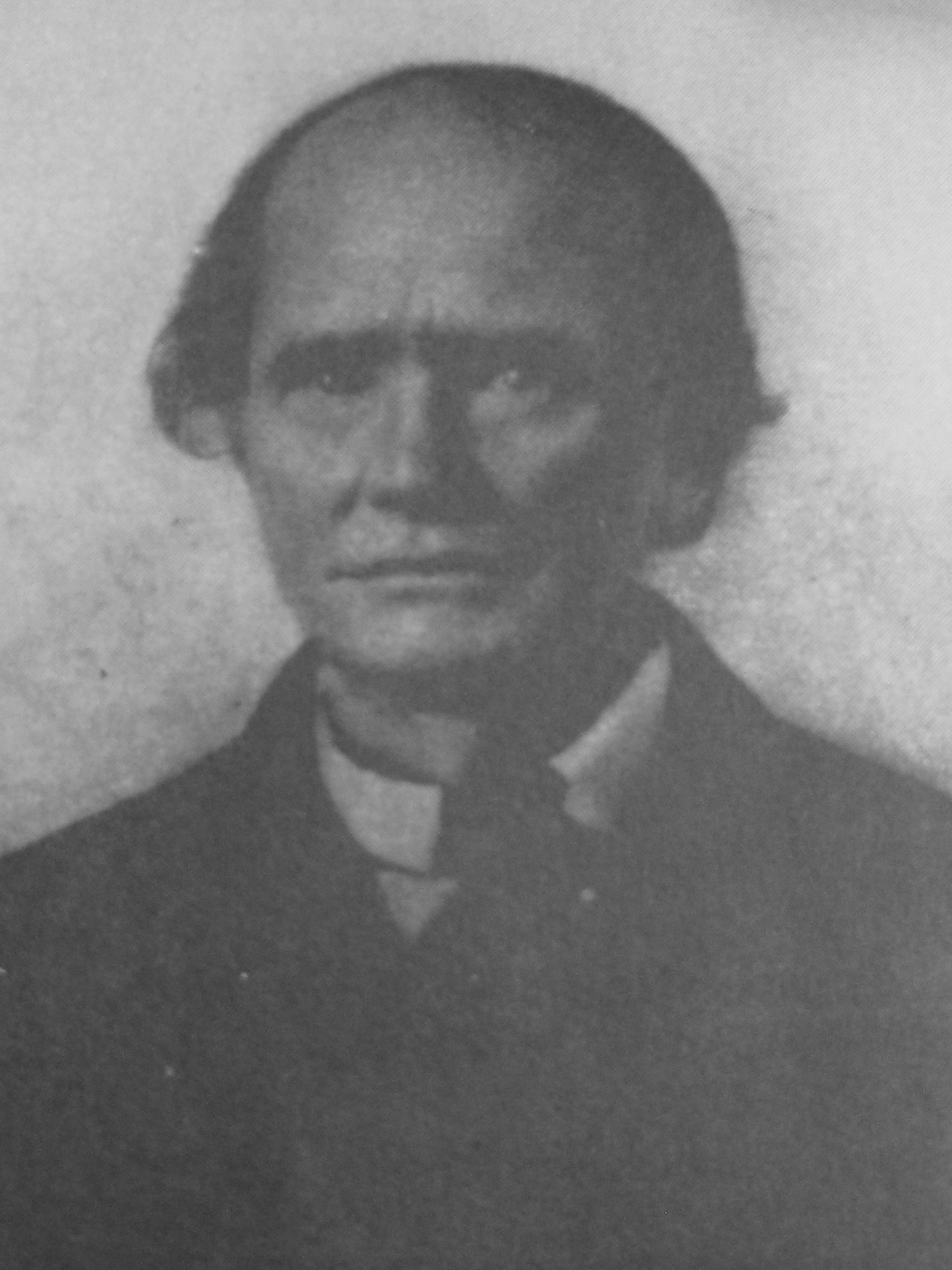
Solomon Jones, 1802–1899

From 1840 to 1848, the self-taught mountain road builder Solomon Jones (1802–1899) cut a toll road from Caesars Head, South Carolina, to Cedar Mountain, North Carolina. Because Jones had no formal training, local legend claimed he had blazed the trail with a hatchet while following the lead of a sow. The unpaved Jones Gap Road (largely abandoned by 1910) was the only direct route between Greenville County and Transylvania County, North Carolina, until in the 1930s an alternate route was chosen for the Geer Highway (U. S. Route 276).

In the early 1950s, Henry Ware, who had in his youth traveled through the Gap in a wagon, encouraged his cousin, businessman E. Ervin Dargan to buy 2,000 acres of Jones Gap land from the Saluda Land and Lumber Company. In 1976, fearing the destructive potential of real estate development and the increase of motorized vehicles traveling the old road, the men both sold and donated their land to the state for use as a park.

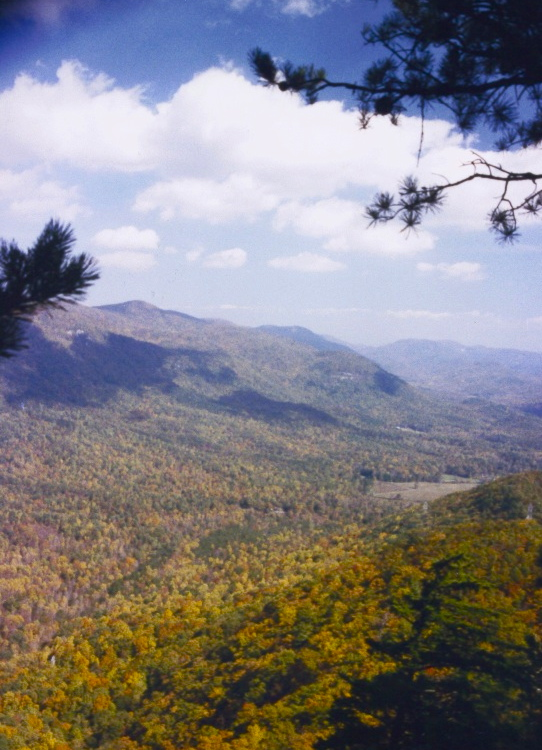
Vista, Rim of the Gap Trail, late October.

During the same period, Greenville attorney Thomas Wyche conceived the idea of a Mountain Bridge Wilderness; and in 1973, he organized the Naturaland Trust to secure and protect the nearly 10,000-acre (4,047 ha) of privately owned mountain lands between the Table Rock and Poinsett watersheds, including Jones Gap. In 1978, the state began to acquire properties, much of it with money granted from the federal Land and Water Conservation Fund. The park officially opened in January 1989. Smaller tracts in Jones Gap continued to be purchased by Naturaland Trust and The Nature Conservancy into the 21st century.

== Natural history ==
Jones Gap State Park is a forested wilderness that ranges in elevation from 1,000 to 3,000 feet and is home to more than 60 varieties of mammals, 600 kinds of wildflowers, and 160 types of songbird. Some of its trees are more typical of those found in Pennsylvania or Maine. The Middle Saluda River, South Carolina's first state-designated scenic river, runs through the park as does the Eastern Continental Divide.

== Recreation ==
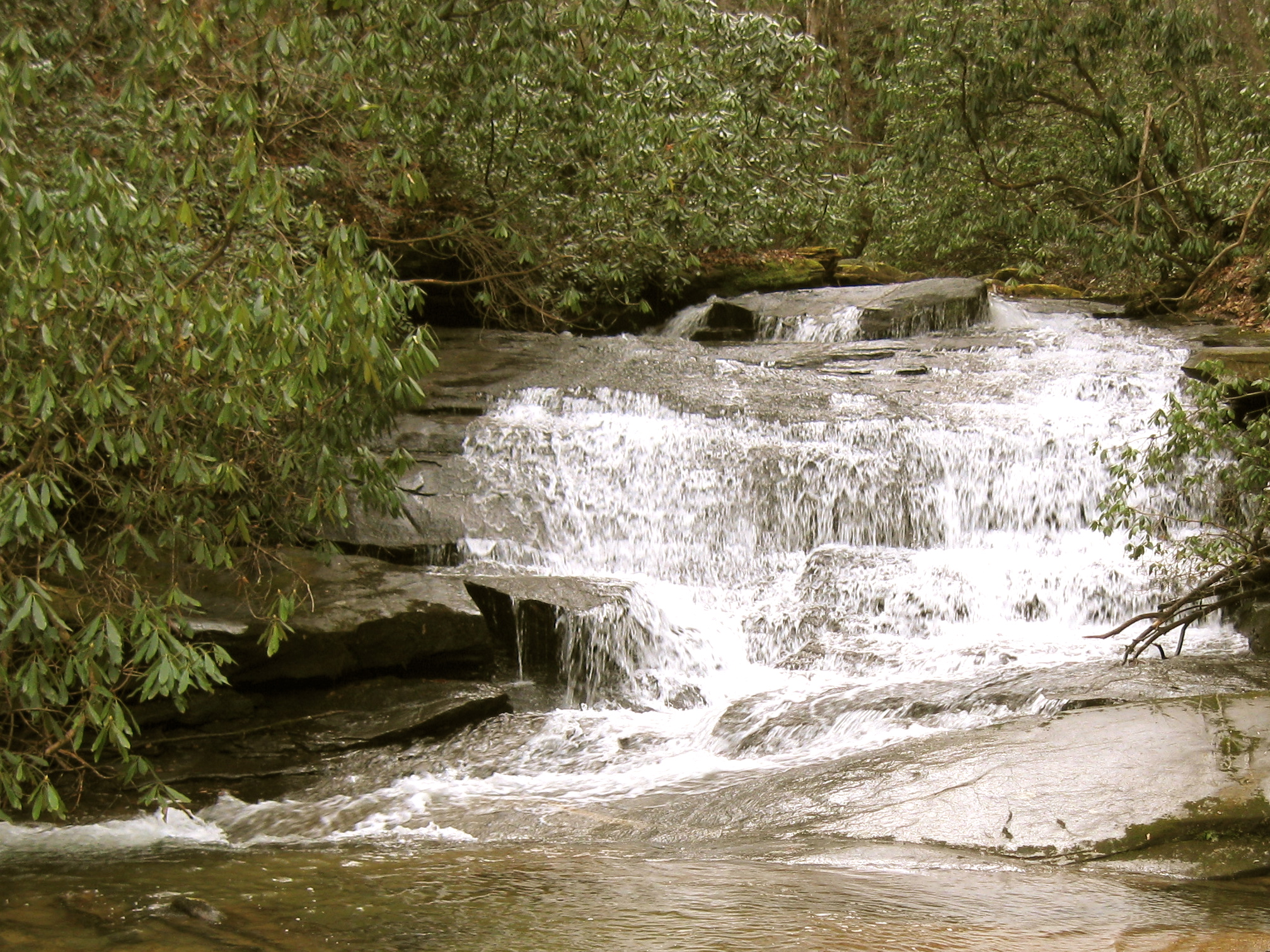
Waterfall, Jones Gap Trail.

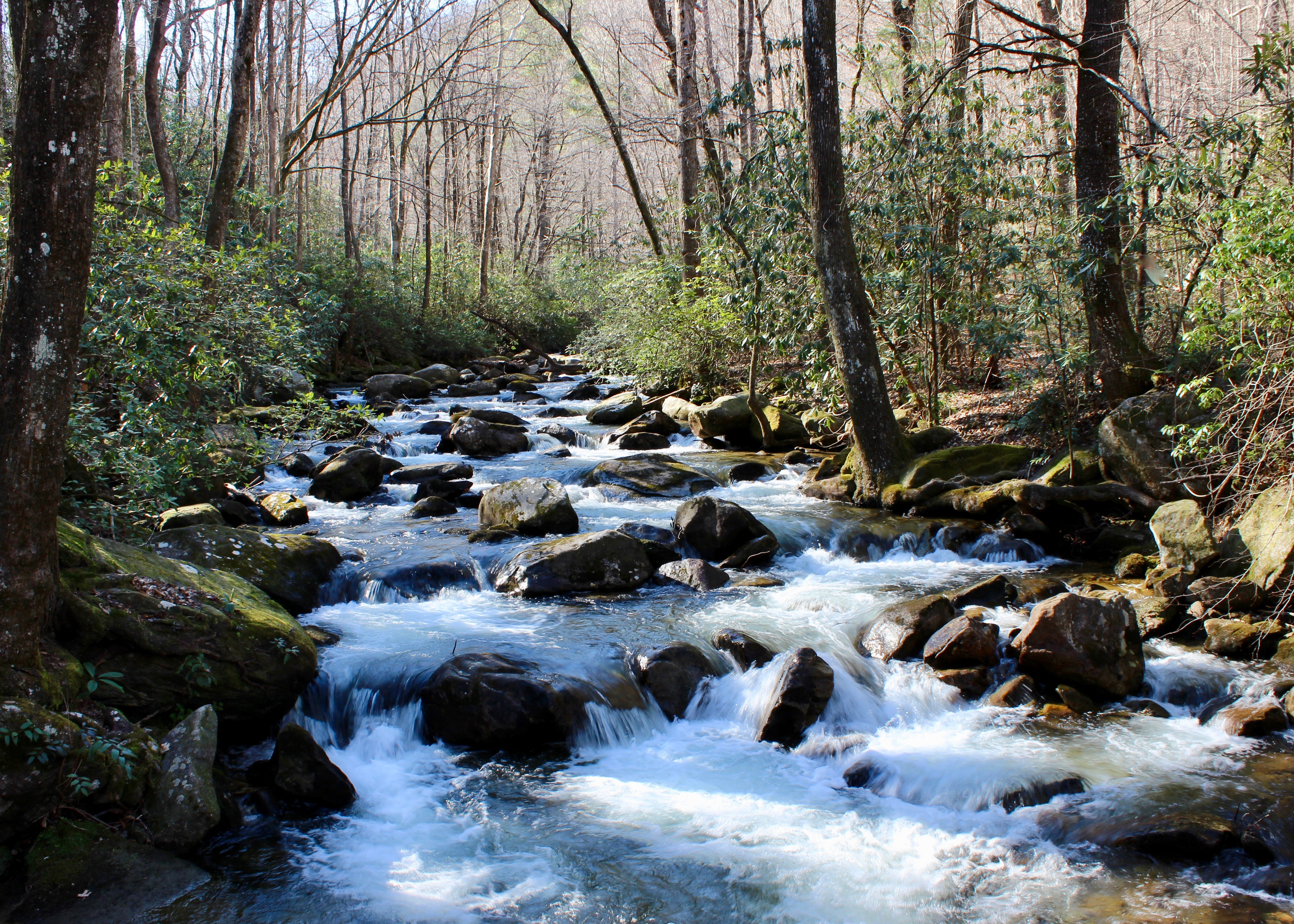
Middle Saluda River, Jones Gap State Park.

There are more than 30 miles of hiking trails in the park, many of which include waterfalls. Backcountry trailside camping is allowed at designated sites. Other popular activities include fishing, bird watching, and geocaching. The park Learning Center features a classroom, aquatic ecology lab, and a small gift shop. Jones Gap is also the site of the partially restored Cleveland Fish Hatchery, South Carolina's first fish hatchery, which operated between 1931 and 1962.
