= Arvīds Jansons =

Latvian conductor

Arvīds Jansons (10 October 1914 – 21 November 1984) was a Latvian conductor and father of conductor Mariss Jansons.

== Biography ==
Jansons was born in Liepāja.

He studied violin from 1929 until 1935 at the Conservatory of Liepāja, then composition and conducting (under Leo Blech) at the Conservatory of Riga from 1940 until 1944 while working as violinist at Riga Opera.

In 1944 he was appointed conductor of Riga Opera, then of the Latvian Radio Orchestra (1947–1952). In 1952 he was appointed reserve conductor, and tour conductor, of the Leningrad Philharmonic behind Yevgeny Mravinsky and Kurt Sanderling.

Jansons became principal guest conductor of the Hallé Orchestra in 1965.

He collapsed and died from a heart attack in 1984 while conducting a concert with the Hallé in Manchester. He is buried next to Karl Eliasberg in Volkovo Cemetery, Saint Petersburg.

== Recordings ==
For Melodiya

- Antonín Dvořák: Symphony No. 9 in E minor (From the New World) USSR Symphony Orchestra
- César Franck; Symphony in D minor
- Franz Liszt; Symphonic poem Tasso, Leningrad Philharmonic Orchestra
- Andrei Petrov: Poem, for strings, organ, four trumpets, and percussion Leningrad Philharmonic Orchestra
- Pyotr Tchaikovsky; Suite No. 1 and Symphony No. 3 Polish Moscow Radio Symphony Orchestra
- Manuel de Falla; El amor brujo with Irina Arkhipova.

Caprice Records, Sweden

- Hilding Rosenberg; Violin Concerto No. 2, Leon Spierer, Royal Stockholm Philharmonic Orchestra

== Radio archives ==
BBC

- Dmitri Shostakovich: Symphony No. 5; Tchaikovsky's Sleeping Beauty (1971)
- Gustav Mahler: Symphony No. 5 (1984, final performance, sound archive of the British Library)
