= Andrew Constantine =

British conductor

Andrew Constantine (born William Andrew Constantine, 30 December 1961, County Durham, England) is a British conductor. He is currently the music director of both the Fort Wayne Philharmonic (appointed 2009) and the Reading Symphony Orchestra (appointed 2007).

== Early life ==
Born in County Durham, England in 1961, Constantine began playing the cello at age eleven. At the age of sixteen, he went to a boarding school specialising in music – the Wells Cathedral School in Somerset, England. From there, he studied further at the Royal Northern College of Music in Manchester and later enrolled in the University of Leicester, where he studied conducting and began to perform as a conductor. He studied firstly with John Carewe and Norman Del Mar, then later with Ferdinand Leitner at the Accademia Chigiana in Siena and Leonard Bernstein at the Schleswig-Holstein Music Festival. After winning the first Donatella Flick Conducting Competition, Constantine went to Russia's Leningrad Conservatory for a year of study with the then 90-year-old Ilya Musin. A conductor, teacher and theorist of conducting, Musin taught at the Conservatory for six decades, and his book, "The Techniques of Conducting," has been followed worldwide

== Career ==
=== Bardi Symphony Orchestra (1986-2003) ===
In 1986, Constantine began his rise as a conductor in a most unusual way. Bringing together many musicians from a range of different backgrounds (who, though they had studied music to the highest levels, pursued careers outside of music) in and around the Leicestershire (UK) area, Constantine founded the Bardi Symphony Orchestra. A professional orchestra still with its current home in Leicester at De Montfort Hall, the Bardi is associated with performers from the Royal Philharmonic Orchestra, the London Philharmonic Orchestra, and the CBSO. At the same time, Constantine worked regularly with nearly all of the finest British orchestras mentioned previously as well as having strong relationships with a number of European and Scandinavian orchestras including the St. Petersburg Philharmonic, where he has worked frequently as a guest conductor. After winning the first Donatella Flick/ Accademia Italiana Conducting Competition Andrew Constantine made his Royal Festival Hall debut with the London Philharmonic. In 2003 he was awarded the Honorary Degree of Doctor of Music by the University of Leicester, for this "contribution to music", and also a prestigious British NESTA Fellowship to further develop his international career.

=== Baltimore Symphony Orchestra (2004-2007) ===
Having gained a reputation in Europe and the UK as a skilled conductor, Andrew Constantine moved to the US in 2004 to become Assistant Conductor of the Baltimore Symphony Orchestra. Constantine has always had a love of Russian conductors, and because Yuri Temirkanov was conductor of the Baltimore Symphony at that time, it was an opportunity he gladly seized. He knew of Temirkanov's reputation as a guest conductor for the leading orchestras of Europe, Asia and the United States and of his longtime position as Music Director and Chief Conductor of the Saint Petersburg Philharmonic in Russia. Within Constantine's first season in Baltimore, he was promoted to Associate Conductor, consistently working many of the orchestra's main concerts whilst stressing the importance of educational concerts which he himself took charge of as well. As he states, "I really see the education concerts as the future of this whole business. It's all about how to get enough kids through the door, and literally leave no child behind. This is where we should be investing our enthusiasm".

=== Reading Symphony Orchestra (2007-) ===
In May 2007, following a two-year search and a pool of over 280 applicants, Constantine was appointed Music Director of the Reading Symphony Orchestra in Reading, Pennsylvania, with an opening season that brought critical and box office acclaim. In his first concert with the orchestra, the Reading Eagle praised his "attention to detail" further stating that "the musicians' response to Constantine's faultless direction, made this a thoroughly captivating performance". Constantine later gained further praise for his consistently creative and compelling programming over the seasons in Reading, and won acclaim with the orchestra for the RSO's Star Spangled Spectacular on 4 July 2011 in front of a sellout crowd.

=== Fort Wayne Philharmonic (2009-) ===
In July 2009, following a similar search to that in Reading, Constantine was also appointed Music Director of the Fort Wayne Philharmonic in Fort Wayne, Indiana. Constantine was one of eight finalists for the philharmonic job and one of about 275 applicants, the Philharmonic said. The orchestra board of directors chose him based on input from the search committee, staff, board members, musicians and audience, orchestra officials said, in a unanimous decision. Constantine continues to bring a fresh aspect to the programming aspect of being a music director in Fort Wayne. With the Signature Series, Constantine set out to break down the resistance to classical music. Constantine said that he is striving to make the orchestra relevant to as many people as possible. Along the same wavelength, he introduced to The Phil's 2011–2012 season an "audience choice" concert, where fans of the orchestra were able to vote online for which composers and pieces they wished to hear. He said, "No two people have the same experience of classical music. Our interpretation draws on personal insights, memories and feelings. The challenge is to persuade more people to go to concerts and discover this for themselves". Due to its popularity, Constantine decided to repeat the audience choice program for the 2012–13 season. That season was also unique for including at least one modern work in each of the regular concerts. The Philharmonic announced that the 2026-27 season would be Constantine's final season in Fort Wayne. However, Constantine decided to leave at the end of the 2025-26 season, after conducting Beethoven's ninth symphony

== Discography ==
Constantine has recorded extensively throughout his conducting career. Early releases include Spanish Masterworks for the Guitar with Virginia Luque and the London Symphony Orchestra and Clarinet Concertos with Steven Kanoff and the Munich Radio Orchestra. In 1995, he recorded Brahms: Double Concerto / Schumann: Cello Concerto In A Minor with Maria Kliegel, Ilya Kaler, and the National Symphony Orchestra of Ireland on Naxos Records.

Later records include Walter Bricht on Toccata Classics, which explores the music of the Jewish composer who fled Vienna to teach at Indiana University in Bloomington, and ELGAR: THE NEW ENGLAND CONNECTION on Orchid Classics, which studies the connections between composers Edward Elgar and George Chadwick.

== Recognition ==
Constantine was described by Classic FM (the UK's largest radio station) as "a Rising Star of Classical Music". In the US he has won great praise for his ability to communicate with audiences and his energetic and compelling advocacy for classical music have gained him many admirers. Both his compatriots and critics have had nothing but good to say of the English-born conductor:

- “the real thing, a serious conductor” – Yuri Temirkanov
- “a conductor of immense capabilities” – Yan Pascal Tortelier
- “a brilliant representative of the art of conducting” – Ilya Musin
- “The poise and hushed beauty of the London Philharmonic’s playing was one of the most remarkable qualities of Constantine’s direction. He has an exceptional gift for holding players and listeners on a thread of sound, drawing out the most refined textures.” – Edward Greenfield, The Times
- “Definiteness of intention is a great thing, and Constantine’s shaping of the music was never short of it” – Financial Times
- “Andrew Constantine showed a capacity RFH audience just what he is made of, ending his big demanding programme with an electrifying performance of Prokofiev’s Symphony No. 5.” – The Independent

== Personal life ==
Though working in both Reading, PA, and Fort Wayne, IN, Constantine still resides where he began his career in the US in Baltimore, MD. He lives there with his wife Jane, and their two children Michael and Rosie.
