= Mariss Jansons =

Latvian conductor (1943–2019)

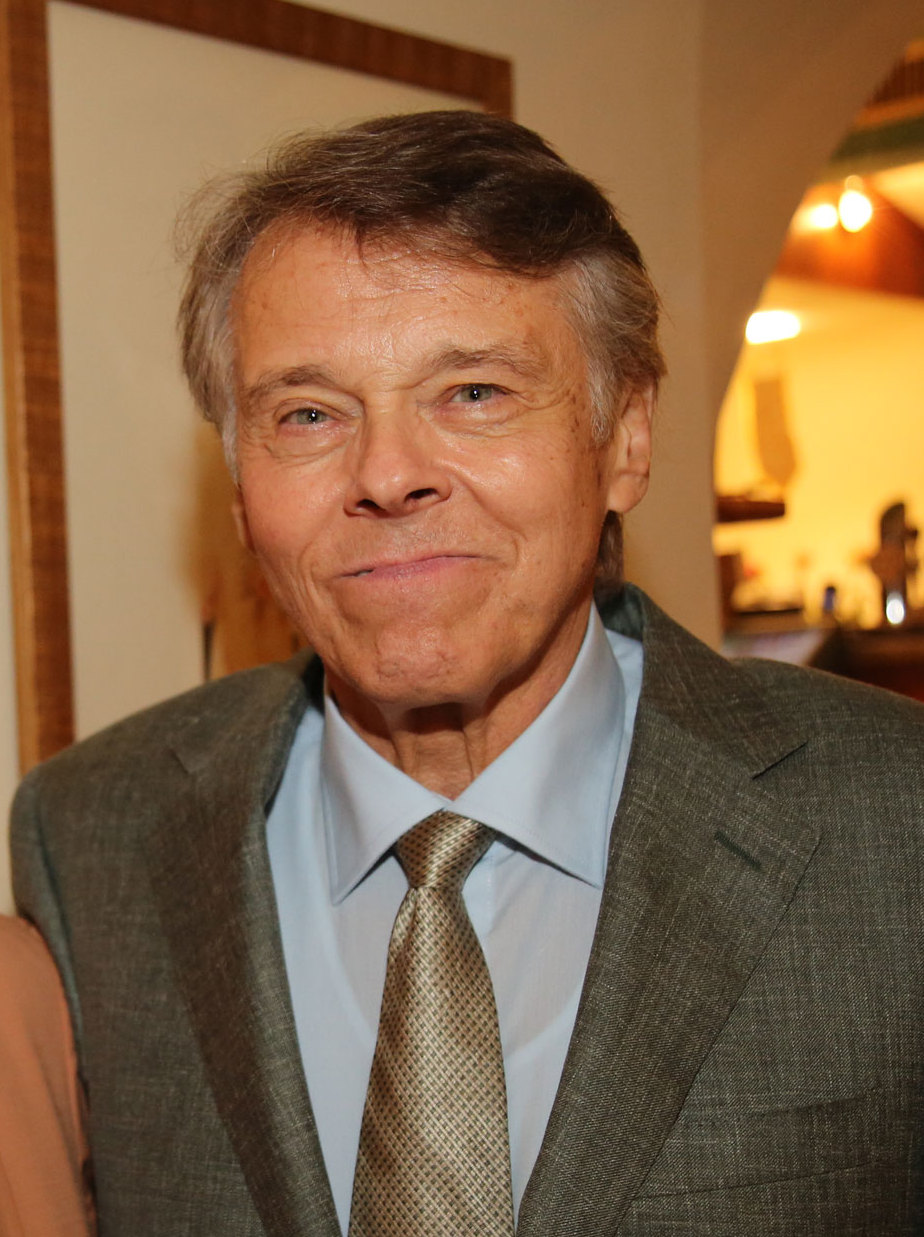
- Mariss Jansons in 2015
- Born: Mariss Ivars Georgs Jansons; 14 January 1943; Riga, Reichskommissariat Ostland, Nazi Germany (now Riga, Latvia)
- Died: 1 December 2019 (aged 76) (Note: The family confirms that the death was in the early hours of 1 December 2019. The two last orchestras that Mariss Jansons led as music director also confirm that the date of his death was on 1 December 2019.); Saint Petersburg, Russia
- Citizenship: Russia, Latvia
- Occupation: Conductor
- Organizations: Oslo Philharmonic; Pittsburgh Symphony Orchestra; Bavarian Radio Symphony Orchestra; Royal Concertgebouw Orchestra
- Relatives: Arvīds Jansons (father)
- Awards: Ernst von Siemens Music Prize

Mariss Ivars Georgs Jansons (14 January 1943 – 1 December 2019) was a Latvian conductor, best known for his interpretations of Mahler, Strauss, and Russian composers such as Tchaikovsky, Rachmaninoff, and Shostakovich. During his lifetime he was often cited as among the world's leading conductors; in a 2015 Bachtrack poll, he was ranked by music critics as the world's third best living conductor. Jansons was long associated with the Bavarian Radio Symphony Orchestra (BRSO; 2003–2019) and Royal Concertgebouw Orchestra (RCO; 2004–2015) as music director.

Born in Riga, Latvia, Jansons moved to Leningrad (now Saint Petersburg) in 1956, where he studied conducting, and he received further training in Austria. He first achieved prominence with the Oslo Philharmonic, where he served as music director from 1979 to 2000. Besides the BRSO and RCO, he also directed the Pittsburgh Symphony Orchestra from 1997 to 2004; he was a frequent guest conductor with the London Philharmonic Orchestra and London Symphony Orchestra. Jansons recorded prolifically, and was the recipient of numerous awards.

== Early life ==
Jansons was born in Riga, Latvia—then under German occupation during the Second World War—to Iraida Jansons, the diva of the Riga Opera, and Arvīds Jansons, conductor of the opera orchestra. Iraida, who was Jewish, gave birth to her son in hiding after being smuggled out of the Riga Ghetto, where her father and brother were murdered by the Nazis. As a child, Jansons first studied violin with his father.

In 1956, Arvīds was appointed assistant conductor to Yevgeny Mravinsky at the Leningrad Philharmonic. Jansons joined his father in Leningrad, where he began to study conducting, and soon entered the Leningrad Conservatory. In 1968, Herbert von Karajan visited the Soviet Union, and he singled out Jansons and Dmitri Kitayenko from a group of young conductors. Karajan offered Jansons the opportunity to study with him in Berlin, but the Soviet authorities blocked the offer. In 1969, Jansons continued his training with Hans Swarowsky in Vienna, and then in Salzburg with Karajan. In 1971, Jansons won the second prize at the "Herbert von Karajan" International Conducting Competition. Karajan invited Jansons to be his assistant with the Berlin Philharmonic, but the Soviet authorities blocked Jansons from ever hearing about the offer.

== Career ==
Scene from the documentary Imperfect Harmony, with Mariss Jansons and Louis Andriessen preparing a new composition by the latter with the Royal Concertgebouw Orchestra

In 1973, Jansons was appointed associate conductor of the Leningrad Philharmonic Orchestra. In 1979, he was appointed music director of the Oslo Philharmonic, with which he performed, recorded and toured extensively. Jansons resigned his Oslo position in 2000 after disputes with the city over the acoustics of the Oslo Concert Hall.

In 1992, Jansons was named principal guest conductor of the London Philharmonic Orchestra. He worked as a guest conductor with the London Symphony Orchestra and recorded Mahler's Symphony No. 6 with them for the LSO Live label.

In 1997, Jansons became the music director of the Pittsburgh Symphony Orchestra. His initial contract was for three years, but his subsequent contract renewals were evergreen contracts that required yearly renewal. In June 2002, he announced his resignation, which would become effective in 2004.

In April 1996, Jansons nearly died from a severe heart attack while conducting the final pages of La bohème in Oslo. He recuperated in Switzerland. Later, surgeons in Pittsburgh fitted an implanted defibrillator in his chest to give his heart an electric jolt if it failed. (Jansons's father had died at a 1984 concert, conducting the Hallé Orchestra.) Jansons stated that he suffered from jet lag, and this was one reason that he left his American position.

At the start of the 2003–2004 season, Jansons began his tenure as chief conductor of the Bavarian Radio Symphony Orchestra (BRSO), for an initial contract of three years. His commitment with the BRSO was for ten weeks per season. In September 2006, Jansons extended his initial BRSO contract to August 2009. In July 2007, he further extended his contract with the BRSO to August 2012. In April 2011, he extended his BRSO contract to August 2015 in Munich. In June 2013, the BRSO further extended Jansons's contract through August 2018. In May 2015, the BRSO announced another extension of Jansons's contract through 2021. In July 2018, the orchestra announced a further extension of his contract through 2024. He regularly campaigned for the construction of a new concert hall for the orchestra. On 8 November 2019, he conducted his final orchestral concert, at Carnegie Hall with the BRSO and Diana Damrau.

In October 2002, Jansons was named the sixth chief conductor of the Royal Concertgebouw Orchestra (RCO) of Amsterdam, effective 1 September 2004, succeeding Riccardo Chailly. His initial Amsterdam contract was for three years, and his commitment in Amsterdam was for twelve weeks per season. In April 2014, the orchestra announced that Jansons was to stand down as chief conductor after the 2014–2015 season. He conducted his final concert as chief conductor of the RCO on 20 March 2015, in the presence of King Willem-Alexander and Queen Maxima. He subsequently held the title of conductor emeritus of the KCO until his death.

In 2006, Jansons conducted the Vienna Philharmonic New Year's Concert for the first time. Also in January 2006, he was awarded MIDEM's Artist of the Year Award in Cannes. In October 2007, Jansons (who was Lutheran) conducted Beethoven's Ninth Symphony with the Bavarian Radio Symphony Orchestra for Pope Benedict XVI and 7,000 other listeners in the papal audience hall (Auditorio Paul VI). Jansons conducted the Vienna New Year's Concert for the second time in 2012, and for the third and final time in 2016.

== Personal life ==
Jansons was married twice. He and his first wife, Ira, had a daughter, called Ilona, who became a pianist. The marriage ended during his tenure in Oslo. Jansons and his second wife Irina (née Outchitel), a former speech therapist, had a home in Saint Petersburg, where Jansons kept his collection of scores. He held both Latvian and Russian citizenship.

Jansons died during the night of 30 November 2019 / 1 December 2019 at his home in the Tolstoy House, Saint Petersburg, as a result of a longstanding heart condition, aged 76.

== Awards and recognition ==
Jansons was awarded various international honours for his achievements, including Commander of the Royal Norwegian Order of Merit from King Harald of Norway and memberships in the Royal Academy of Music in London and the Gesellschaft der Musikfreunde (Society of Music Friends) in Vienna. He was awarded the St. Hallvard Medal in 1986. In May 2006, he was awarded the Order of the Three Stars (2nd class or Grand Commander), Latvia's highest state honour. He was awarded the Bavarian Order of Merit in 2007 and in 2010, the Bavarian Maximilian Order for Science and Art. In 2008, Jansons received the Austrian Cross of Honour for Science and Art.

Jansons' recording of Shostakovich's Symphony No. 13 with Sergey Aleksashkin (bass) and the Bavarian Radio Symphony Orchestra and Chorus won the Grammy Award for Best Orchestral Performance at the 2006 Grammy Awards.

In January 2006 he was awarded a Midem, a Cannes Classical Award as Artist of the Year. In 2007 he was honoured by the German Phono Academy with the Echo Klassik as Conductor of the Year. In 2011, he was awarded the same title by the German journal Opernwelt.

Jansons won the Ernst von Siemens Music Prize in 2013. On 31 March 2013 Jansons was awarded a medal of honour "For the Merits before St. Petersburg". On 4 October 2013, Jansons received the Grand Merit Cross with Star of the Federal Republic of Germany.

On 1 November 2013, Jansons was awarded Knight of the Order of the Netherlands Lion and received it from Dutch Minister of Education, Culture and Science Jet Bussemaker.

In November 2017, the Royal Philharmonic Society awarded Jansons the RPS Gold Medal, with Mitsuko Uchida presenting the medal to Jansons during a concert with the Bavarian Radio Symphony Orchestra (Symphonieorchester des Bayerischen Rundfunks) on 24 November 2017 at the Barbican Hall. Jansons was the 104th recipient of the RPS Gold Medal.

In 2018, Jansons was awarded honorary membership of the Berlin Philharmonic Orchestra, and in June 2018 of the Vienna Philharmonic.

On 14 April 2019, Jansons received the Herbert von Karajan Prize at the Salzburg Easter Festival. In 2019, he received the Opus Klassik award in the category "Lifetime Achievement”.

In 2020, the BRSO posthumously awarded its Karl Amadeus Hartmann Medal to Jansons.

== Selected recordings ==
Jansons is credited on over 190 orchestral recordings.

- Ludwig van Beethoven: The Symphonies and Reflections – Bavarian Radio Symphony Orchestra (BR-KLASSIK 900119)
- Hector Berlioz: Symphonie fantastique – Bavarian Radio Symphony Orchestra (BR-KLASSIK 900121)
- Benjamin Britten: War Requiem – Emily Magee, Mark Padmore, Christian Gerhaher, Bavarian Radio Symphony Orchestra (BR-KLASSIK 900120)
- Anton Bruckner: Symphony No. 7 – Bavarian Radio Symphony Orchestra (BR-KLASSIK 403571900100)
- Antonín Dvořák: Stabat Mater – Erin Wall, Mihoko Fujimura, Christian Elsner, Liang Li, Chor des Bayerischen Rundfunks and Bavarian Radio Symphony Orchestra (BR-KLASSIK 900142)
- Gustav Mahler: Symphony No. 5 – Bavarian Radio Symphony Orchestra (BR-KLASSIK 900150)
- Gustav Mahler: Symphony No. 7 – Bavarian Radio Symphony Orchestra (BR-KLASSIK 403571900101)
- Gustav Mahler: Symphony No. 9 – Bavarian Radio Symphony Orchestra (BR-KLASSIK 900151)
- Dmitri Shostakovich: Symphony No. 5 – Bavarian Radio Symphony Orchestra (BR-KLASSIK 900191)
- Dmitri Shostakovich: Symphony No. 7 – Bavarian Radio Symphony Orchestra (BR-KLASSIK 900184)
- Dmitri Shostakovich: Symphony No. 10 – Bavarian Radio Symphony Orchestra (BR-KLASSIK 900185)
- Dmitri Shostakovich: Symphony No. 13 – Bavarian Radio Symphony Orchestra (EMI)
- Richard Strauss: Eine Alpensinfonie/Tod und Verklärung – Bavarian Radio Symphony Orchestra (BR-KLASSIK 900148)
- Richard Strauss: Four Last Songs/Vier letzte Lieder, Rosenkavalier-Suite, Till Eulenspiegel's Merry Pranks/Till Eulenspiegels lustige Streiche – Anja Harteros, Bavarian Radio Symphony Orchestra (BR-KLASSIK 900707)
- Pyotr Ilyich Tchaikovsky: The Queen of Spades – Bavarian Radio Symphony Orchestra (BR-KLASSIK 900129)
- Mariss Jansons – His Last Concert: Live at Carnegie Hall (Richard Strauss, Brahms; BR-Klassik 900192)
