= Hermann Fliege =

German composer and conductor

Hermann Fliege (9 September 1829, Stendal, Germany – 8 November 1907, St Petersburg) was a German composer and conductor. In 1882 he was appointed the first director of what would later become the St Petersburg Philharmonic Orchestra when he was named leader of a band of 100 musicians at the court of Tsar Alexander III. He continued to hold this position until his death in 1907.

== Compositions ==
- Eine fromme Schwester (opera)

Cultural offices
Preceded by none	Music Director, St Petersburg Philharmonic; 1882–1907	Succeeded by Hugo Varlikh
