= Greenville Symphony Orchestra =

American orchestra

Greenville Symphony Orchestra (GSO)
- Orchestra
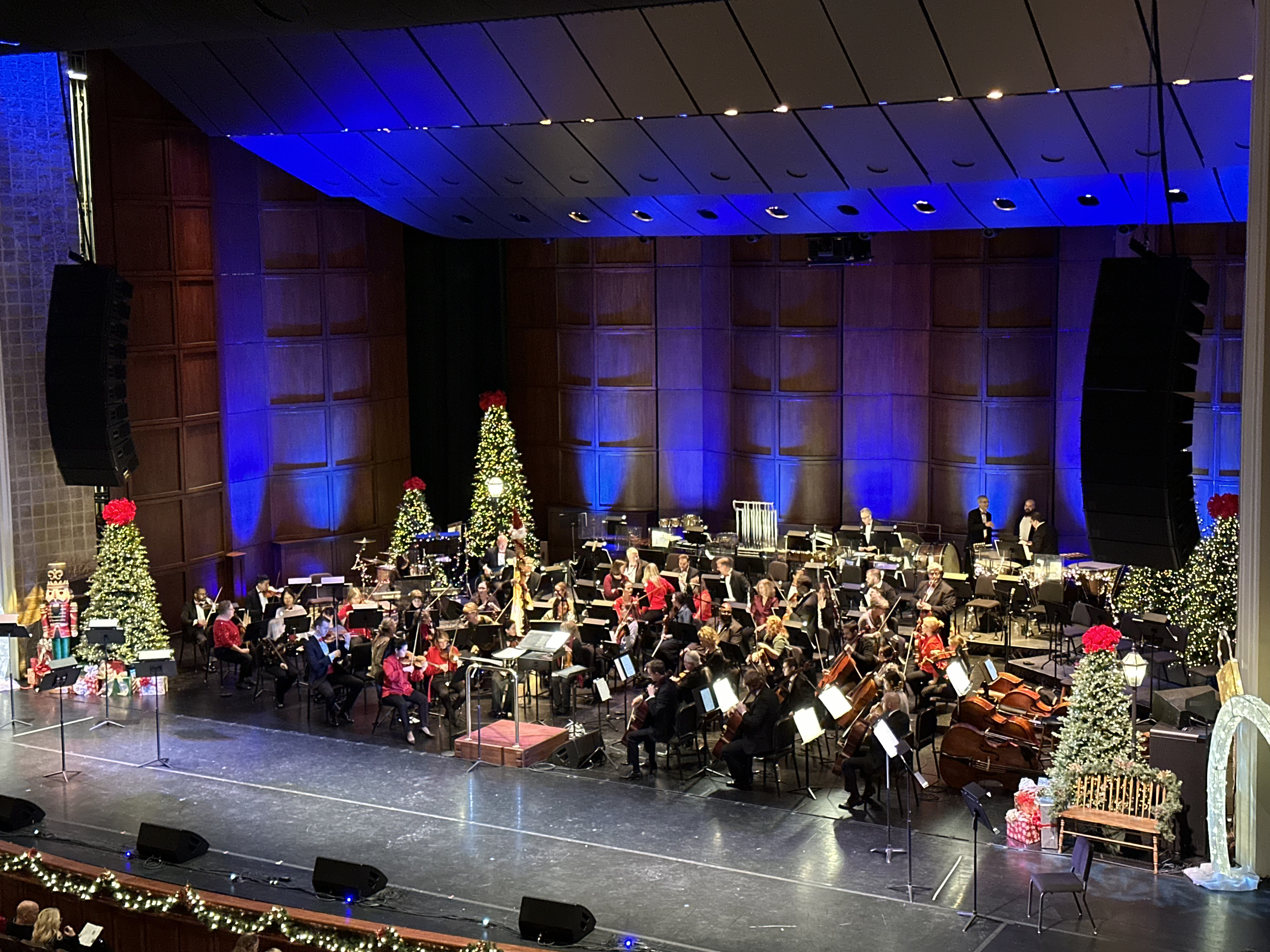
- The Greenville Symphony performing in their annual Christmas concert, December 2023
- Short name: Greenville Symphony
- Founded: 1948
- Location: Greenville, South Carolina
- Concert hall: Peace Center
- Principal conductor: Lee Mills
- Music director: Lee Mills
- Website: greenvillesymphony.org

The Greenville Symphony Orchestra, often referred to simply as the Greenville Symphony, is an American symphony orchestra based in Greenville, South Carolina. Its home is located in the heart of downtown Greenville next to the Peace Center.

== Overview ==
The Greenville Symphony Orchestra is devoted to providing a support of the Arts for the many communities of Greenville, South Carolina. The Greenville Symphony Association (GSA) "provides educational and cultural opportunities for Upstate residents through the presentation of live orchestral music." During each season the Greenville Symphony Orchestra offers a selection of concert programs: six Masterworks concerts, four chamber orchestra concerts, a Holiday at the Peace, and three Spotlight Series concerts. The Masterworks Series, providing great classical masterpieces, is presented at the Peace Center each year. The Chamber Orchestra Series, featuring a different side of classical repertoire, is held at the Gunter Theatre. The GSO Spotlight Series, offering a casual hour of chamber music with friends, takes place at the Centre Stage Theater.

== History ==
The Greenville Symphony Orchestra began as a small group of volunteer musicians practicing in the Women's college auditorium on the old Furman University campus in 1948. One of the most well-known of the original musicians was Mary Evelyn Gooddy McCrary who played cello, viola, violin, and piano. The orchestra performed its first 50 years mainly in Furman's McAlister Auditorium. During the GSO's first three years Furman University professor Robert Cantrick conducted the symphony; the following five years were directed by Pedro Sanjuan. In 1956, Peter Rickett, bass instructor at Furman, became the orchestra's first resident conductor. He led the Greenville Symphony for 34 years. With the opening of The Peace Center for the Performing Arts in 1990, David Pollitt was appointed as the orchestra's fourth music director. Nine years later Edvard Tchivzhel took the positions of both music director and conductor of the Greenville Symphony Orchestra.

The GSO has grown significantly over the years with two concerts being offered during its first season in 1948 to thirty-three concerts in their 60th year. In 2009, one reviewer for The Greenville News wrote about the Greenville Symphony Orchestra, "it's always a packed house." As a feature of the orchestra's classical repertoire, renowned guest artists are invited to perform each concert season.

== Music directors ==
- Robert Cantrick (1948–1951)
- Pedro Sanjuan (1951–1956)
- Peter Rickett (1956–1990)
- David Pollitt (1990–1999)
- Edvard Tchivzhel (1999–2023)
- Lee Mills (2024–present)

Edvard Tchivzhel, GSO's fifth music director and conductor, was born in St. Petersburg, Russia (formerly known as Leningrad, USSR). Being born into a musical family, Tchivzhel has traveled far and has performed with many well-known musicians.

Tchivzhel has performed with many great artists including Yo-Yo Ma, Emanuel Ax, Vladimir Spivakov, Gidon Kremer, Nadja Salerno-Sonnenberg, André Watts, János Starker, Gil Shaham, Olga Kern, Nicolai Demidenko, Joshua Bell, Bella Davidovich, Yuri Bashmet, Evelyn Glennie, Pete Fountain, Sharon Isbin, and Doc Severinsen. He has also made numerous recordings with the St. Petersburg Philharmonic Orchestra, the Moscow Philharmonic Orchestra, the Tchaikovsky Symphony Orchestra of Moscow Radio, the State Russian Orchestra, the Atlantic Sinfonietta, with several orchestras in Sweden, the Fort Wayne Philharmonic Orchestra, and the Greenville Symphony Orchestra. Aside from conducting with many great guest artists, Tchivzhel has won international status with appearances on five continents.

Since Maestro Tchivzhel has taken the podium, many concerts have been sold out. As one reviewer for The Greenville News wrote, "Tchivzhel… proves to be a conductor who digs deeply, carefully observing the score's dynamic and expressive markings, and inspiring the orchestra to excellence with his detailed commands." "During his tenure, season subscriptions, ticket revenues, and concert attendance have all steadily climbed to match the improving quality of the orchestra's musicianship."

== Education ==
Education and outreach have been an important part of the GSO's mission since the first children's concert was presented in 1951. Every year, GSO musicians present free education concerts and programs for nearly 26,000 students in the Upstate. "Lollipops" and "Timbre Tales" are two examples of concerts that the GSO provides as an age appropriate introduction for young audiences to classical music and the instruments of the orchestra. The Lollipop Concert Series, accessible to young audiences, provides an educational opportunity for children to experience a live musical performance paired with a storybook. The GSO also offers a children's concert every year sponsored by Michelin.
