= Vadim Gluzman =

Ukrainian-born Israeli violinist (born 1973)

Vadim Gluzman Вадим Глузман
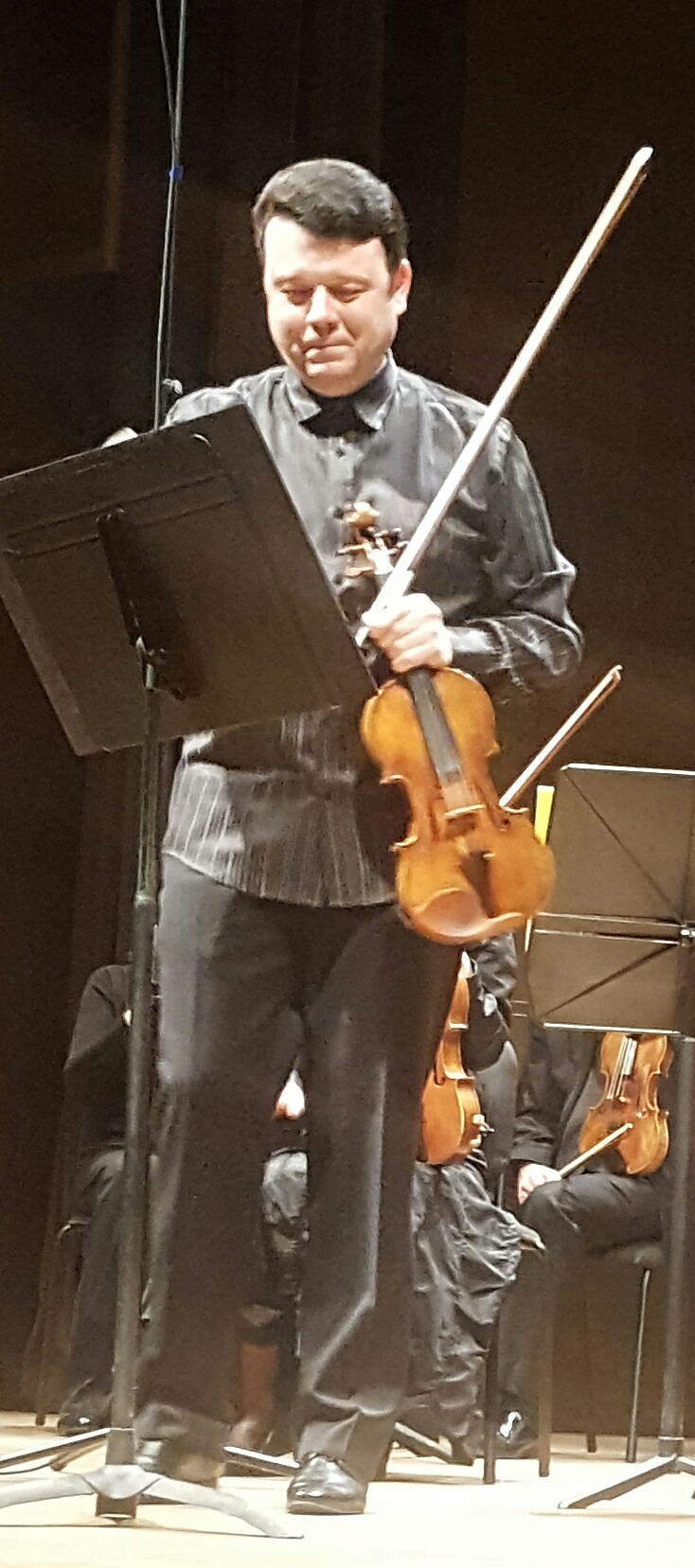
- Vadim Gluzman in Montreal, Quebec, Canada inside the MBAM Bourgie Hall

Background information
- Born: 1 January 1973 (age 53); Soviet Union
- Origin: Riga, Latvia
- Genre: Classical
- Occupation: Violinist
- Instrument: Violin
- Label: BIS
- Education: Juilliard School; Peabody Conservatory
- Board member of: ProMusica Chamber Orchestra (Creative Partner and Principal Guest Artist); Peabody Conservatory (Faculty)
- Awards: Henryk Szeryng Foundation Career Award

Vadim Gluzman (Ukrainian: Вадим Михайлович Глузман; born 1973) is a Ukrainian-born Israeli classical violinist renowned for his performances on the "Ex-Leopold Auer" Stradivarius violin, crafted in 1690. He has appeared with many of the world's leading orchestras, including the Chicago Symphony Orchestra, London Philharmonic Orchestra, and Israel Philharmonic Orchestra. Gluzman is also known for premiering works by contemporary composers such as Giya Kancheli, Pēteris Vasks, and Lera Auerbach.

== Early life ==
Born in the former Soviet Union, Vadim Gluzman spent most of his childhood in Riga, Latvia. His father is a conductor and clarinet player, and his mother a musicologist. Gluzman began violin studies at age 7. He studied with Roman Šnē in Latvia and Zakhar Bron in Russia. In 1990, his family moved to Israel, where he became a student of Yair Kless. He also met Isaac Stern who became an important mentor.

== Career ==
In the United States, Gluzman's teachers were Arkady Fomin and, at the Juilliard School, Dorothy DeLay and Masao Kawasaki. Early in his career, Gluzman enjoyed the encouragement and support of Isaac Stern. In 1994, he received the Henryk Szeryng Foundation Career Award.

Gluzman plays a 1690 Stradivarius violin known as the "Ex-Leopold Auer" (after its previous owner, Hungarian violinist Leopold Auer). It is on extended loan from the Stradivari Society of Chicago.

Vadim Gluzman has performed with many of the world's leading orchestras including Chicago Symphony, London Philharmonic, Israel Philharmonic, London Symphony Orchestra, Leipzig Gewandhaus, Munich Philharmonic, San Francisco Symphony, Minnesota Orchestra and NHK Symphony. He has recorded or performed live the premieres of works by Giya Kancheli, Peteris Vasks, Lera Auerbach (24 Preludes, recorded on BIS), and Sofia Gubaidulina. Gluzman also serves as the Creative Partner and Principal Guest Artist for ProMusica Chamber Orchestra in Columbus, Ohio. He serves on the faculty of the Peabody Conservatory in Baltimore. In 2005, he was a soloist with the Naumburg Orchestral Concerts, in the Naumburg Bandshell, Central Park, in the summer series.

His recording of Bruch's Violin Concerto No. 1 (BIS) was awarded a Diapason d'Or in 2011.
