= Yuri Temirkanov =

Russian conductor (1938–2023)

- Юрий Темирканов
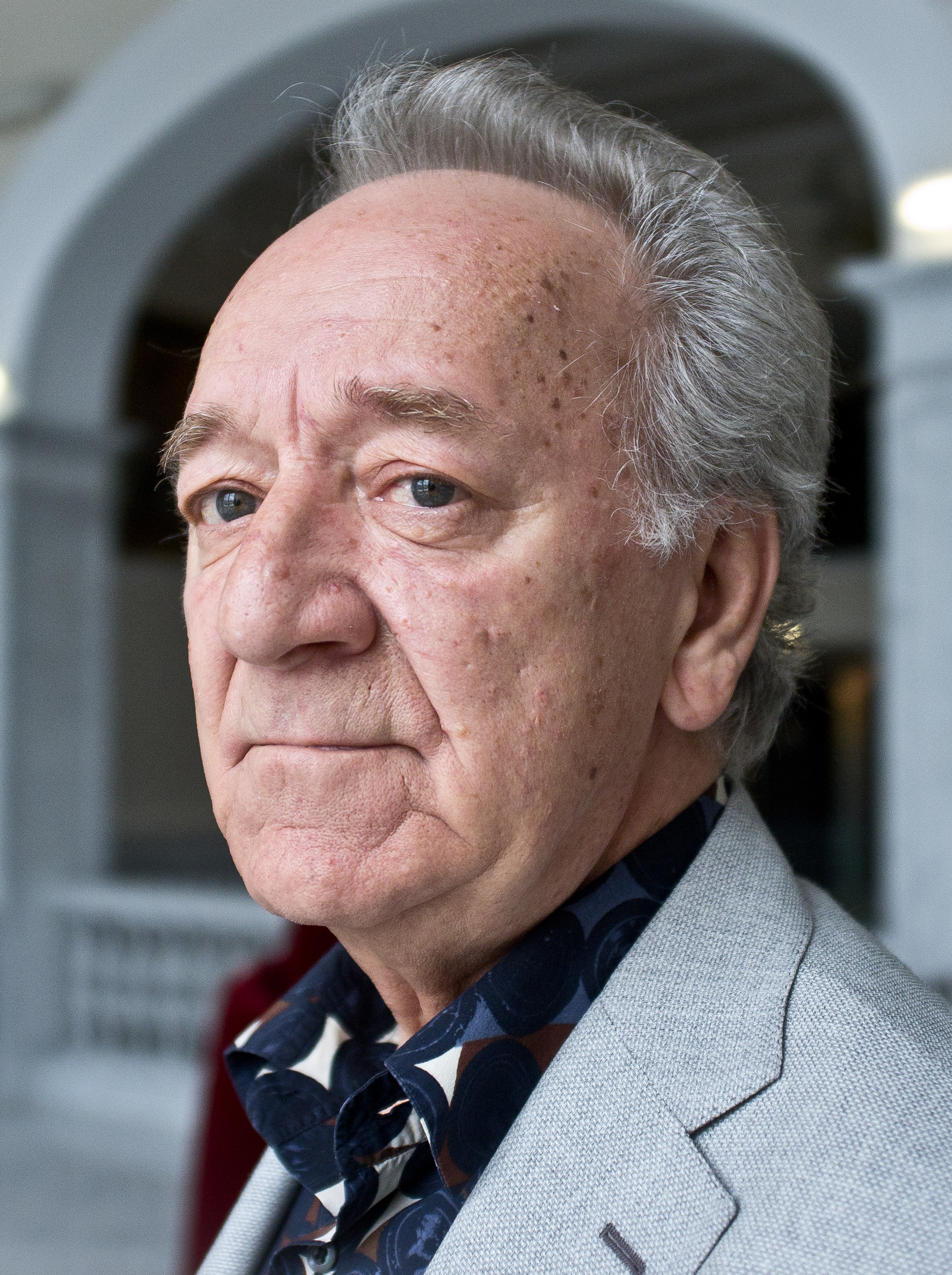
- Temirkanov in 2012
- Born: December 10, 1938; Nalchik
- Died: November 2, 2023 (aged 84); Saint Petersburg
- Occupation: Conductor
- Awards: People's Artist of the USSR

Yuri Khatuevich Temirkanov (Russian: Ю́рий Хату́евич Темирка́нов; Kabardian: Темыркъан Хьэту и къуэ Юрий; 10 December 1938 – 2 November 2023) was a Soviet and Russian conductor, named a People's Artist of the USSR.

== Early life ==
Born in 1938 in the North Caucasus city of Nalchik, Temirkanov attended the Leningrad School for Talented Children where he continued his studies in violin and viola. His older brother Boris was also a conductor.

== Career ==
In 1968, he was appointed principal conductor of the then-renamed Leningrad Symphony, where he remained until his appointment as music director of the Kirov Opera and Ballet in 1976.

Temirkanov was the first Soviet artist permitted to perform in the United States after cultural relations were resumed with the Soviet Union at the end of the Soviet–Afghan War in 1988.

Temirkanov became artistic director and chief conductor of the St. Petersburg Philharmonic in 1988. He was music director of the Baltimore Symphony Orchestra from 2000 until 2006. He served as principal guest conductor of the Danish National Symphony Orchestra and conductor laureate of the Royal Philharmonic Orchestra in London. In 2015, the Teatro La Fenice awarded Temirkanov its prize 'A Life for Music' (unofficially known as the Nobel Prize for Musicians).

== Death ==
Yuri Temirkanov died on 2 November 2023, at the age of 84.

== Controversy ==
Temirkanov drew attention for saying that women are essentially weak and thus not well suited to be classical conductors. In a 2016 interview, he stated:

"Yes, women can be conductors. I am not against them conducting. But I simply don't like it."

== Honors and awards ==
- State Prize of the Russian Federation in Literature and Art in 1998 (4 June 1999) – for concert programs 1995–1998 Academic Symphony Orchestra, St. Petersburg Philharmonic Society named after Shostakovich
- Russian Federation President Prize in Literature and Art in 2002 (13 February 2003)
- The 6432 Temirkanov asteroid was named after the conductor (1975)
- Order of the Rising Sun, 3rd Class, Gold Rays with Neck Ribbon (2015)

== Gallery ==
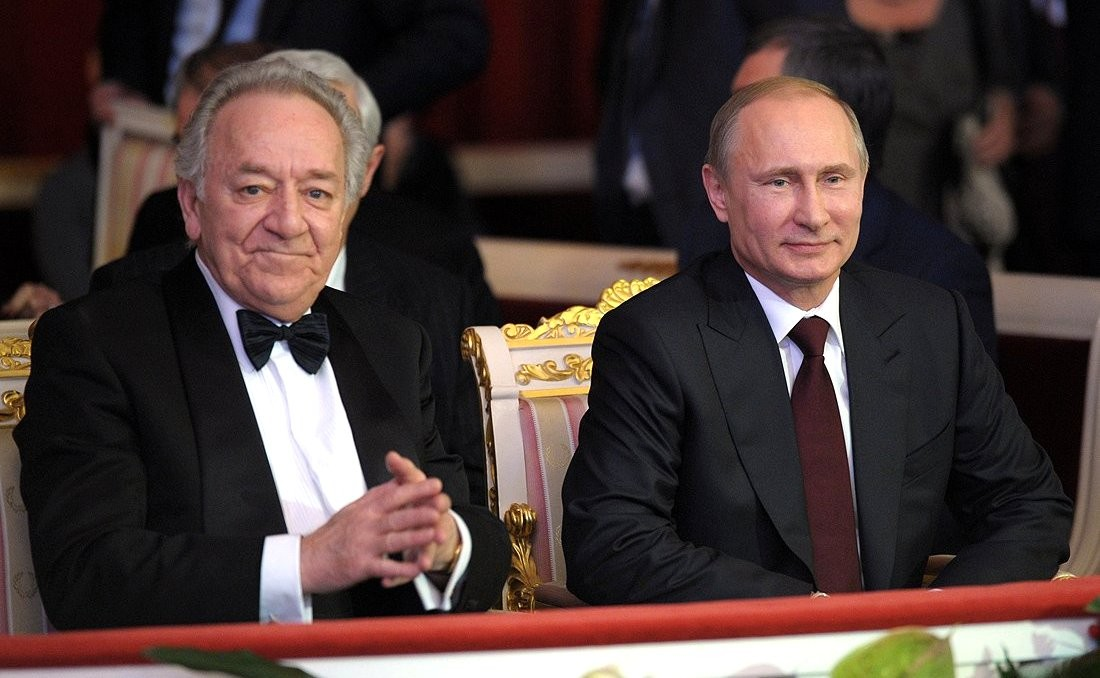
Yuri Temirkanov and Vladimir Putin at a gala concert dedicated to the 75th anniversary of the conductor (December 14, 2013)

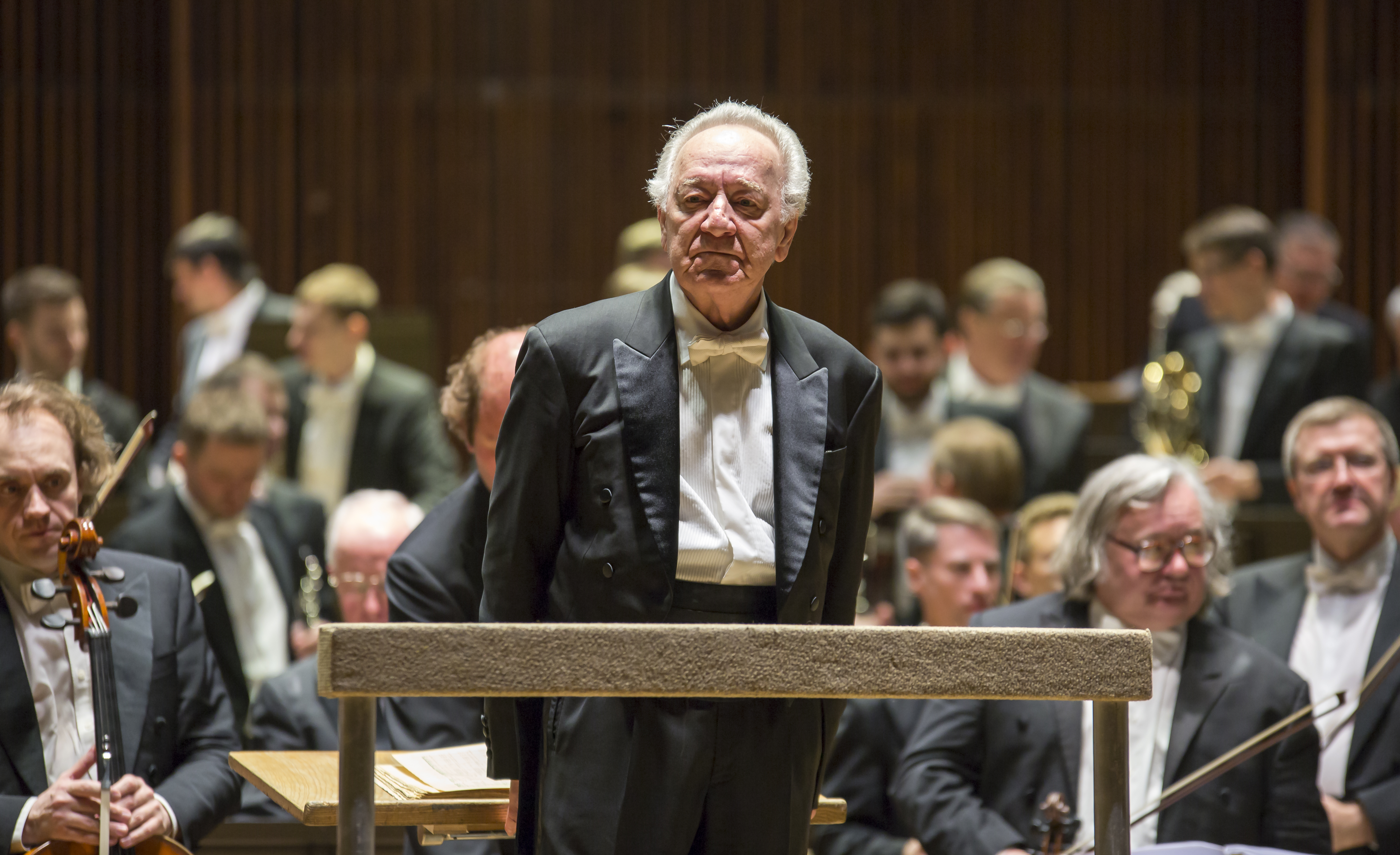
Performing in Israel (2018)

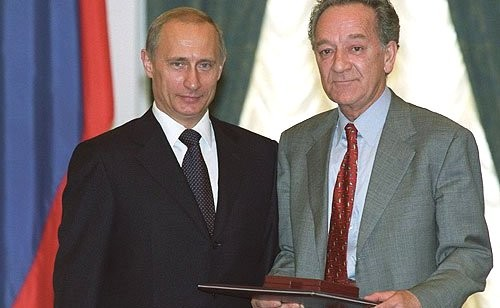
Awarding of the Presidential Prize in Literature and Art in 2002 (June 10, 2003)

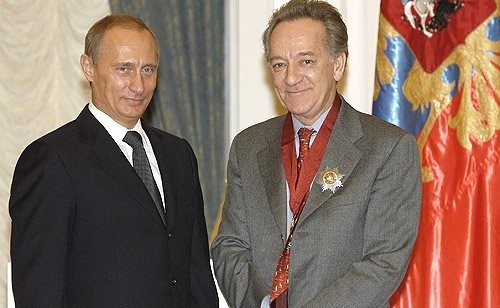
Awarding of the Order "For Merit to the Fatherland", 2nd degree (December 25, 2003)

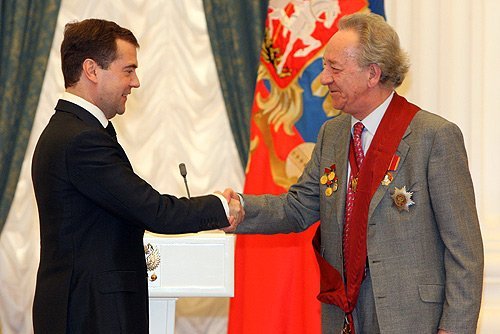
Awarding of the Order "For Merit to the Fatherland", 1st degree (March 5, 2009)

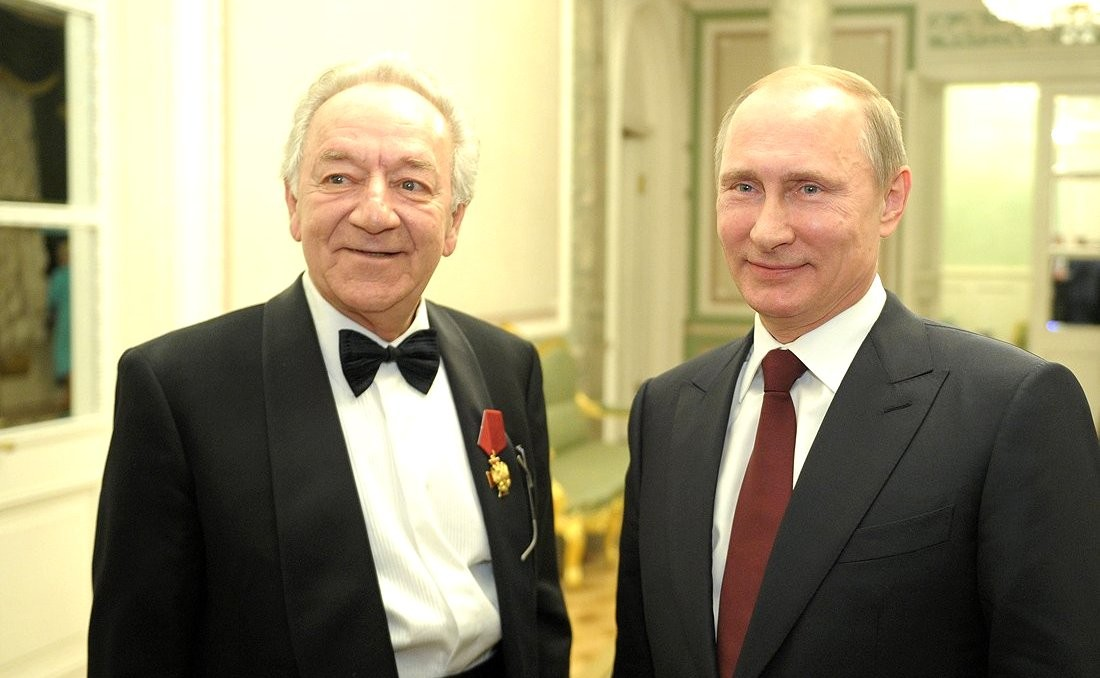
Awarding of the Order "For Merit to the Fatherland", 4th degree (December 14, 2013)

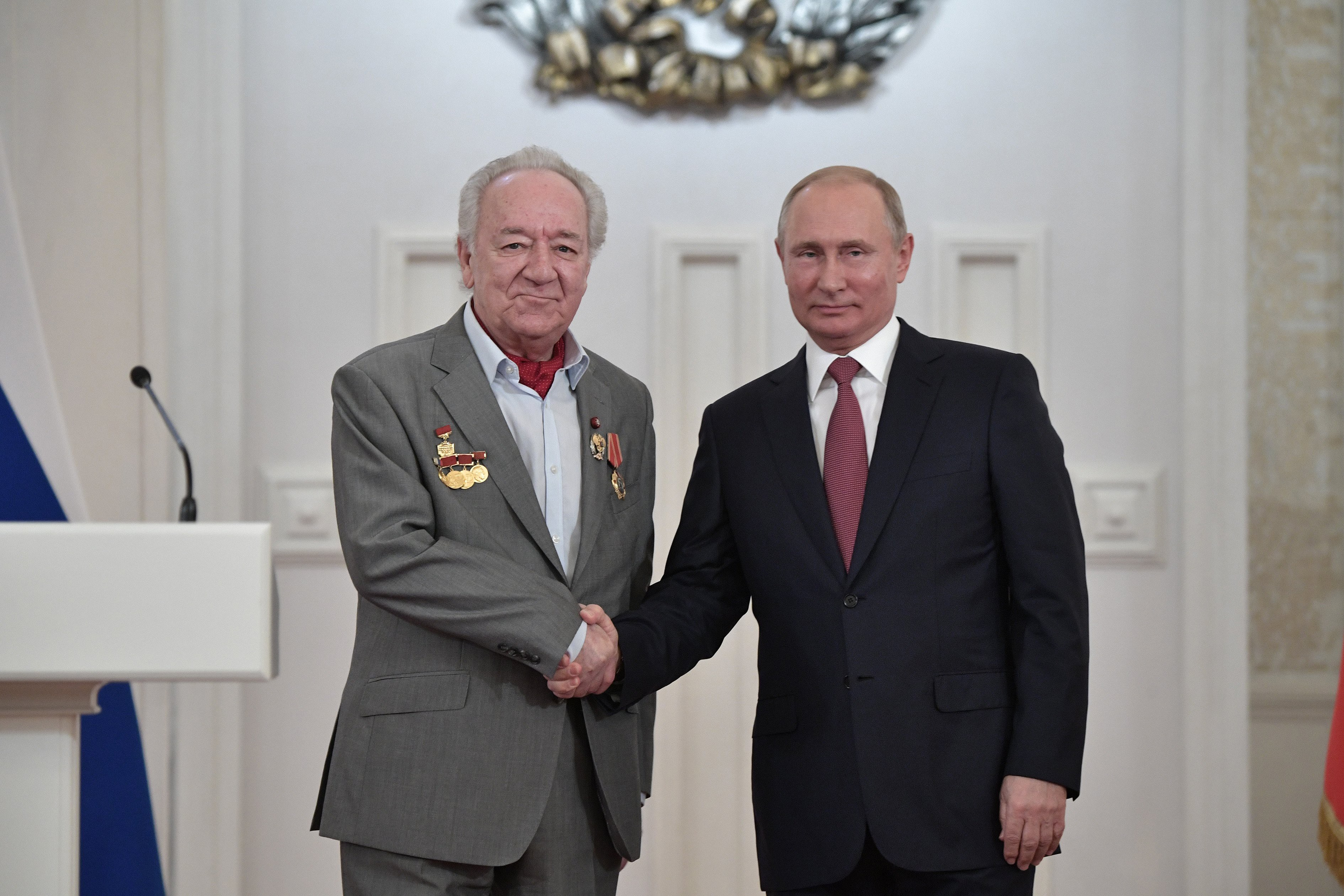
Awarding of the State Prize of the Russian Federation (June 12, 2018)

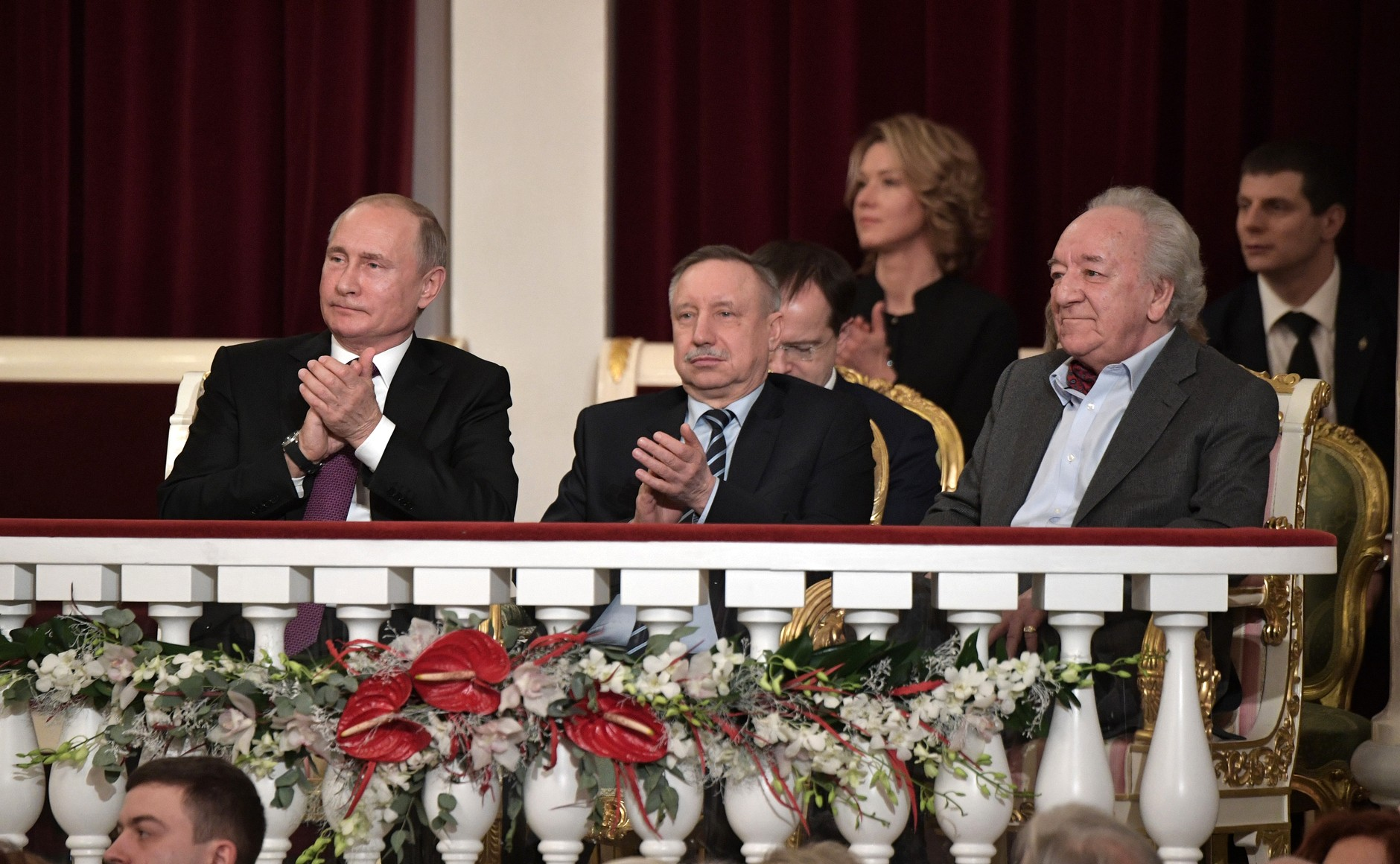
Yuri Temirkanov and Vladimir Putin at a gala concert dedicated to the 80th anniversary of the conductor (December 15, 2018)

Cultural offices
Preceded by Evgeny Mravinsky	Music Director, Saint Petersburg Philharmonic; 1988–2022	Succeeded by Nikolai Alexeev
