= Peace Center =

Performing arts center in Greenville, South Carolina

Coordinates: 34°50′50″N 82°24′4″W

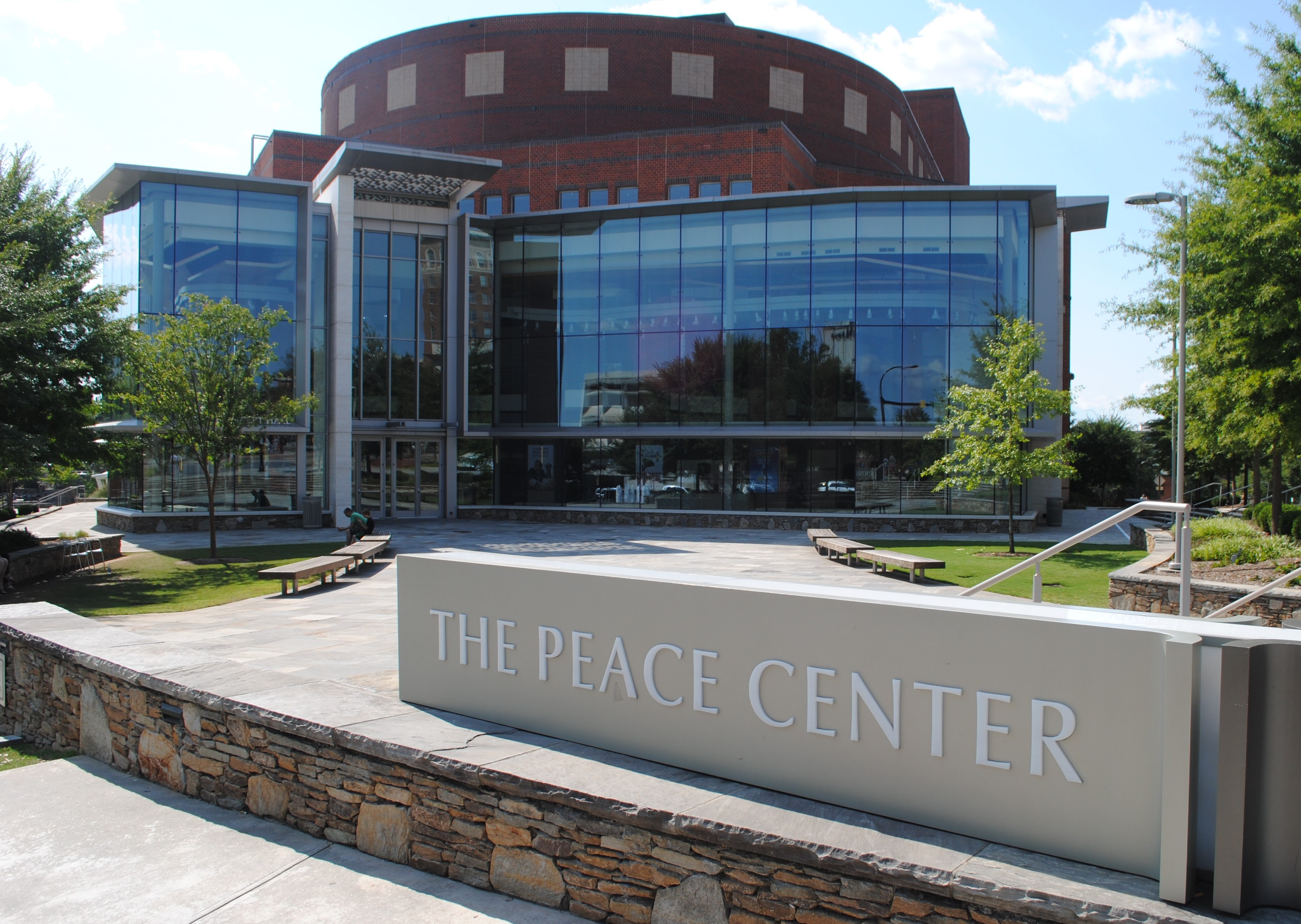
- Exterior of the venue, c. 2016
- Interactive map of Peace Center
- Full name: Peace Center
- Former names: Peace Center for the Performing Arts (planning/construction)
- Address: 300 S Main St; Greenville, SC 29601-2606
- Location: Downtown Greenville
- Owner: Privately Owned Non-Profit
- Seating type: Continental
- Capacity: 2,115 (Peace Concert Hall with Orchestra Pit Seated); 1,450 (TD Stage); 439 (Gunter Theatre with Orchestra Pit Seated)
- Type: Performing arts complex

Construction
- Groundbreaking: November 1990
- Opened: 10 November 1990
- Renovated: 2010
- Cost: $34 million $23 million (2010 renovations)
- Architects: Craig, Gaulden, and Davis
- Structural engineer: Jerit/Boys Incorporated

Tenants
- Carolina Ballet Theatre; Greenville Chorale; Greenville County Youth Orchestra; Greenville Symphony Orchestra; International Ballet

Website
- Venue Website

The Peace Center is a performing arts center located in Greenville, South Carolina. It is composed of a concert hall, theater, and amphitheatre. Located adjacent to Falls Park, the center hosts over 300 events each year, including classical music, Broadway shows, pop stars, and magic shows including David Copperfield.

== About ==
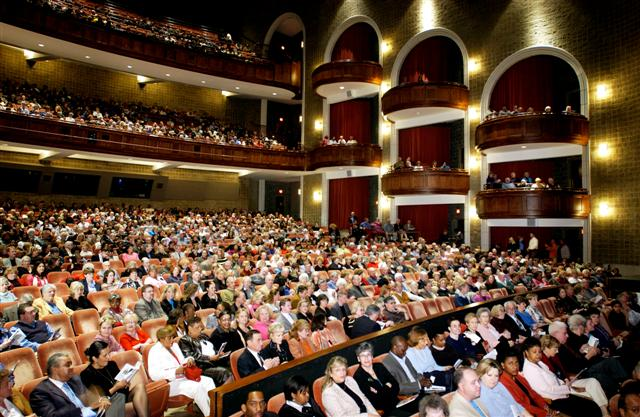
Inside the concert hall

Under consideration since at least the 1970s, a new Greenville performing arts center was being designed and was of utmost importance for then-mayor Bill Workman. The Peace Center is named after the local Peace family who donated $10 million towards its development. The center was opened in 1990 and is built on the former site of three dilapidated factories – one that produced wagons for the Confederate Army, a textile plant built in the 1880s, and a former home of Duke's Mayonnaise. There are three resident companies: Greenville Symphony Orchestra, Carolina Ballet Theatre, and the International Ballet. In January 2004, the Peace Center hosted a debate among Democratic presidential candidates. In May 2011, it was the site of the first Republican debate for the 2012 presidential election. In February 2016, it was the site of the ninth Republican debate for the 2016 presidential election.

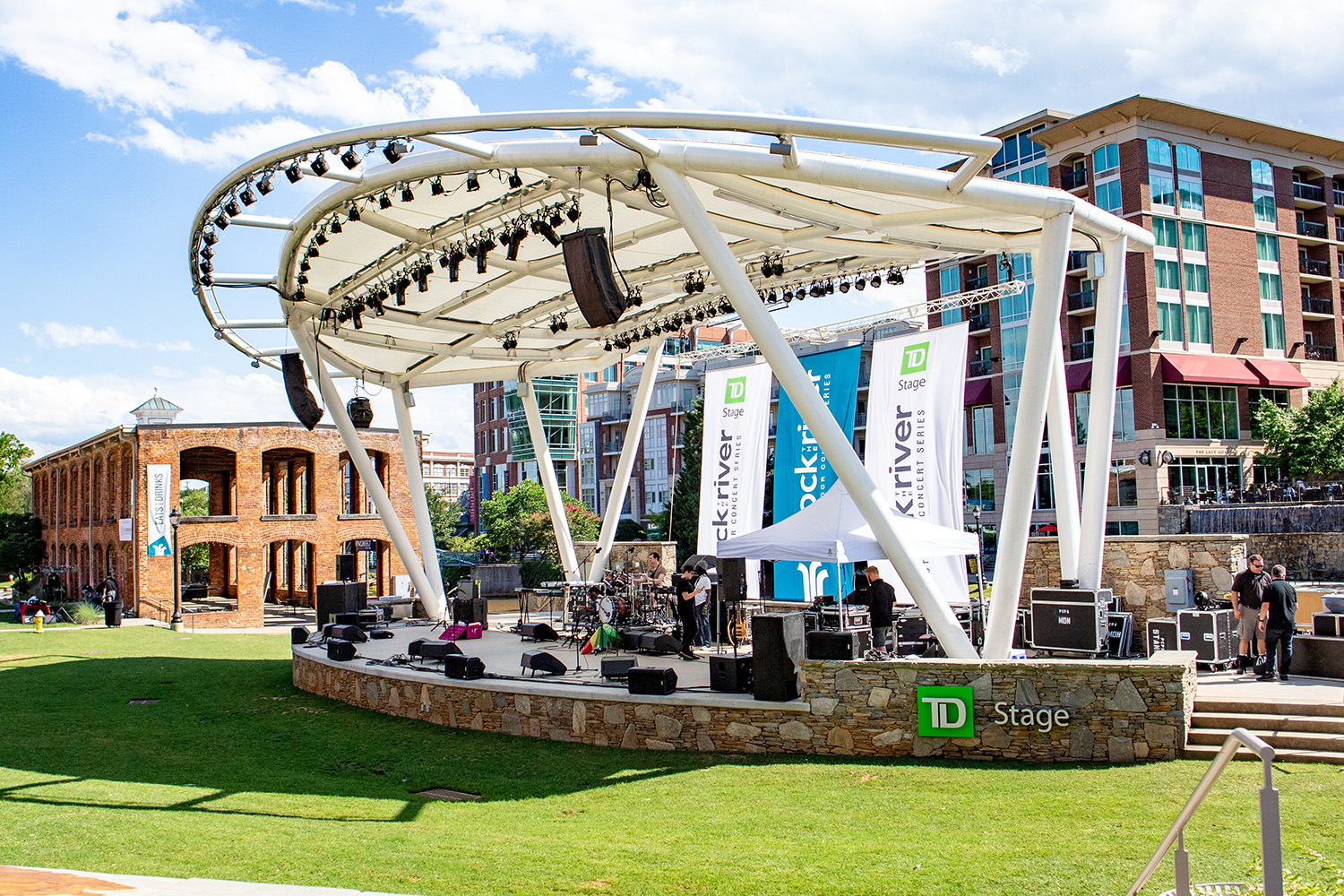
TD Stage in 2020

The TD Stage at the Peace Center (formerly the Peace Center Amphitheater) opened September 12, 2012, hosting Vince Gill. The night started with Mayor Knox White and TD executives hosting a ribbon cutting ceremony. Seating capacity is projected to be 1,400+. Patrons are able to sit along the tiered seat-walls or use blankets or lawn chairs in the open-seating areas.

The Brian Setzer Orchestra performed at the Peace Center in 2006 for their Christmas Rocks Tour, and also played some of their hits like "Jump, Jive, and Wail".

In 2022, a $36 million renovation project was revealed.
