= Fort Wayne Philharmonic Orchestra =

Orchestra in Fort Wayne, Indiana, U.S.

Coordinates: 41°4′32″N 85°8′24″W

- Orchestra
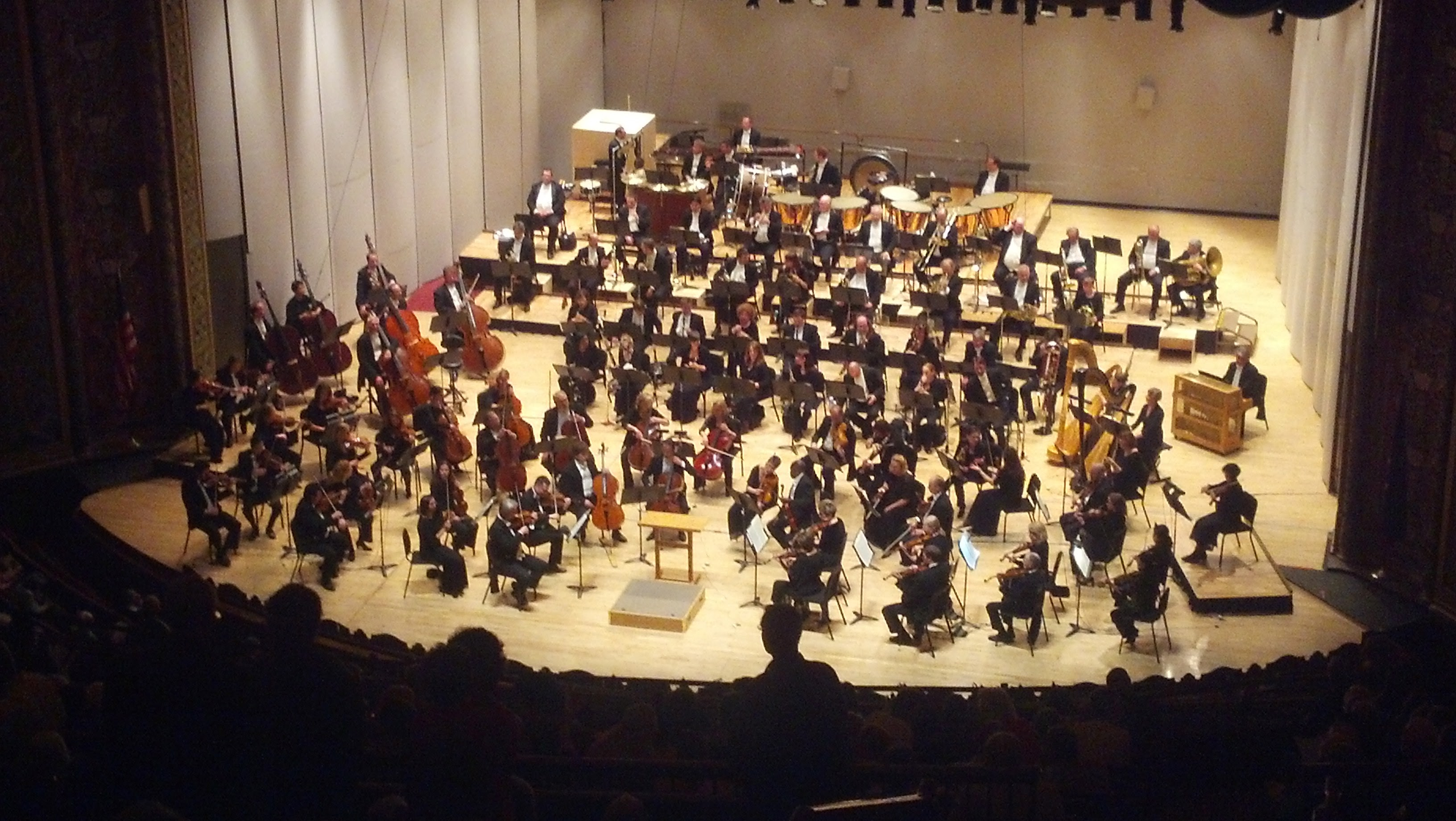
- Orchestra at the Embassy Theatre in 2013
- Short name: Fort Wayne Philharmonic
- Founded: 1944; 82 years ago
- Location: Fort Wayne, Indiana, U.S.
- Concert hall: Embassy Theatre and Auer Performance Hall
- Principal conductor: Andrew Constantine
- Website: fwphil.org
- Logo of Fort Wayne Philharmonic Orchestra

The Fort Wayne Philharmonic Orchestra is an American orchestra based in Fort Wayne, Indiana. The orchestra's primary concert venue is in the Auer Performance Hall at Purdue University Fort Wayne. The orchestra's current music director is Andrew Constantine.

== History ==
The Fort Wayne Philharmonic Orchestra was founded in 1944, and gave its first concert on October 18, 1944, at the Palace Theatre. The first music director was the German-born Hans Schwieger (1907–2000). Under Schwieger's direction, the orchestra featured such soloists as William Kapell, Yehudi Menuhin, and Mario Lanza.

In the summer of 1948, Igor Buketoff became the orchestra's second music director, and served in the post until 1966, the longest serving music director to date. Successive music directors have been James Sample (1967–1970) and Thomas Briccetti (1970–1977). From 1978 to 1993, the orchestra's music director was Ronald Ondrejka (1932–2016). During Ondrejka's tenure, the orchestra's budget tripled in size, and new programming initiatives included regular collaboration with the Fort Wayne Ballet.

Edvard Tchivzhel succeeded Ondrejka as music director in 1993, and served in the post until the end of the 2007–2008 season. Jaime Laredo served as artistic advisor for the 2008–2009 season, in the absence of a full-time music director. The English conductor Andrew Constantine was named the orchestra's next music director in July 2009. His current contract with the orchestra is through 2027. Since 1980, the orchestra has won five awards for adventuresome programming from ASCAP (American Society of Composers, Authors and Publishers). The Fort Wayne Philharmonic Chorus is affiliated with the orchestra, and its current director is Benjamin Rivera.

In addition, a chamber orchestra from the full philharmonic has performed summer concerts. Members of the orchestra have also participated in the "Summer Symphony", founded by Joseph M. Woods in 1956, who played with the philharmonic from 1948 to 1950. Concerts have taken place at the Foellinger Theatre in Franke Park, led by former principal trombonist David Cooke.

A labor dispute between the musicians and management in early December 2022 has resulted in the cancellation of concerts in December 2022, as well as January and February 2023.

Conductor Andrew Constantine stepped down from the orchestra at the end of the 2026 season. The orchestra is conducting a search for a new replacement, which is slated to start at the beginning of the 2027–28 season.

== Broadcasts and recordings ==
In 1999, Tchivzhel and the orchestra recorded a commercial CD at the Honeywell Center in Wabash, which includes Tchaikovsky's Symphony No. 6 and Richard Strauss' symphonic poem Don Juan.

The philharmonic made a new commercial recording during a concert in the Auer Performance Hall at Purdue-Fort Wayne on March 18, 2018, devoted to three works by the Austrian-American composer Walter Bricht (1904–1970).

Performances have often been rebroadcast on a delay by local National Public Radio affiliates, typically WBNI.

== Music directors ==
- Hans Schwieger (1944–1948)
- Igor Buketoff (1948–1966)
- James Sample (1967–1970)
- Thomas Briccetti (1970–1977)
- Ronald Ondrejka (1978–1993)
- Edvard Tchivzhel (1993–2008)
- Andrew Constantine (2010–2026)

== Executive directors (partial list) ==
- Peter W. Smith (1976–1985)
- Christopher D. Guerin (1985–2005)
- Daniel Ross (interim, 2005–2006)
- J.L. Nave (2006–2014)
- James Palermo (2015–2022)
- Brittany Hall (2022–present)

== Note on sources ==
Eyewitness accounts by Robert E. Nylund form part of the reference material for this article.
