= Saint Petersburg Philharmonic Orchestra =

Russian orchestra based in Saint Petersburg

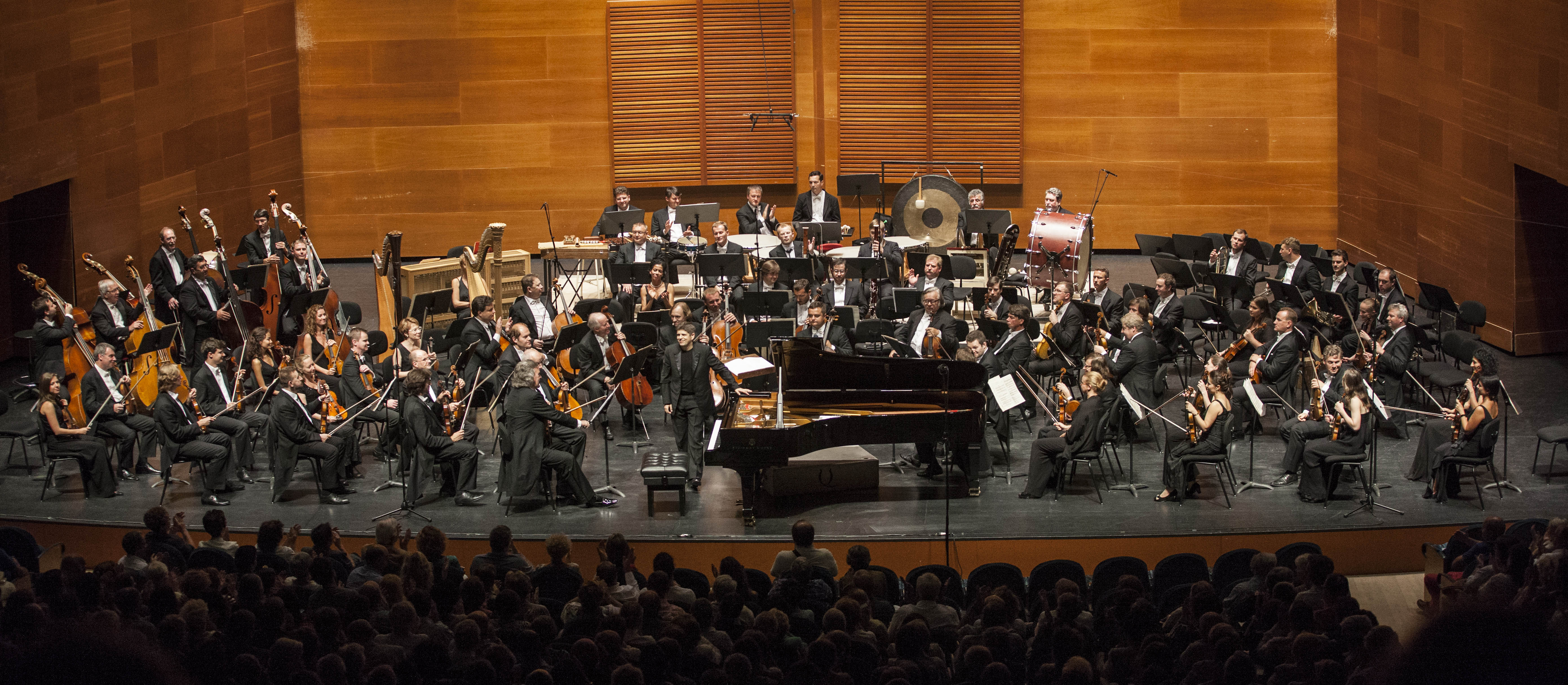
The Saint Petersburg Philharmonic Orchestra in 2015

The Saint Petersburg Philharmonic Orchestra (Russian: Симфонический оркестр Санкт-Петербургской филармонии, Symphonic Orchestra of the Saint Petersburg Philharmonia) is a symphony orchestra based in Saint Petersburg, Russia. Their home venue is the Saint Petersburg Philharmonia.

== History ==
The roots of the orchestra date back to 1802, with the founding of the Saint Petersburg Philharmonic Society that year. The orchestra was initially known as the Imperial Music Choir, and performed for the Court of Alexander III of Russia. By the 1900s, the Orchestra started to give public performances at the Philharmonia and elsewhere in Russia.

After the Russian Revolution, the Orchestra was taken over by the members and the name was changed to the State Philharmonic Orchestra of Petrograd. In the 1920s, the orchestra began receiving support from the State, and began to be known internationally. Its guest conductors included Bruno Walter, Ernest Ansermet, and Hans Knappertsbusch. Following the renaming of Petrograd to Leningrad after the death of Vladimir Lenin, the orchestra was renamed the Leningrad Philharmonic Orchestra.

The orchestra gained its most fame under the chief conductorship of Yevgeny Mravinsky, from 1938 to 1988. It made few tours to the West, and the first tour was to Finland in the spring of 1946. The orchestra and Mravinsky made a number of studio recordings, and various archival live recordings have since subsequently been commercially released. Under Mravinsky's direction, the orchestra premiered seven of Shostakovich's symphonies.

In 1991, the orchestra was renamed the Saint Petersburg Philharmonic Orchestra. Yuri Temirkanov has served as artistic director of the orchestra since 1988, and was its chief conductor from 1988, after the death of Mravinsky, until January 2022. On 21 January 2022, Nikolai Alexeev became chief conductor of the orchestra.

== Chief conductors ==
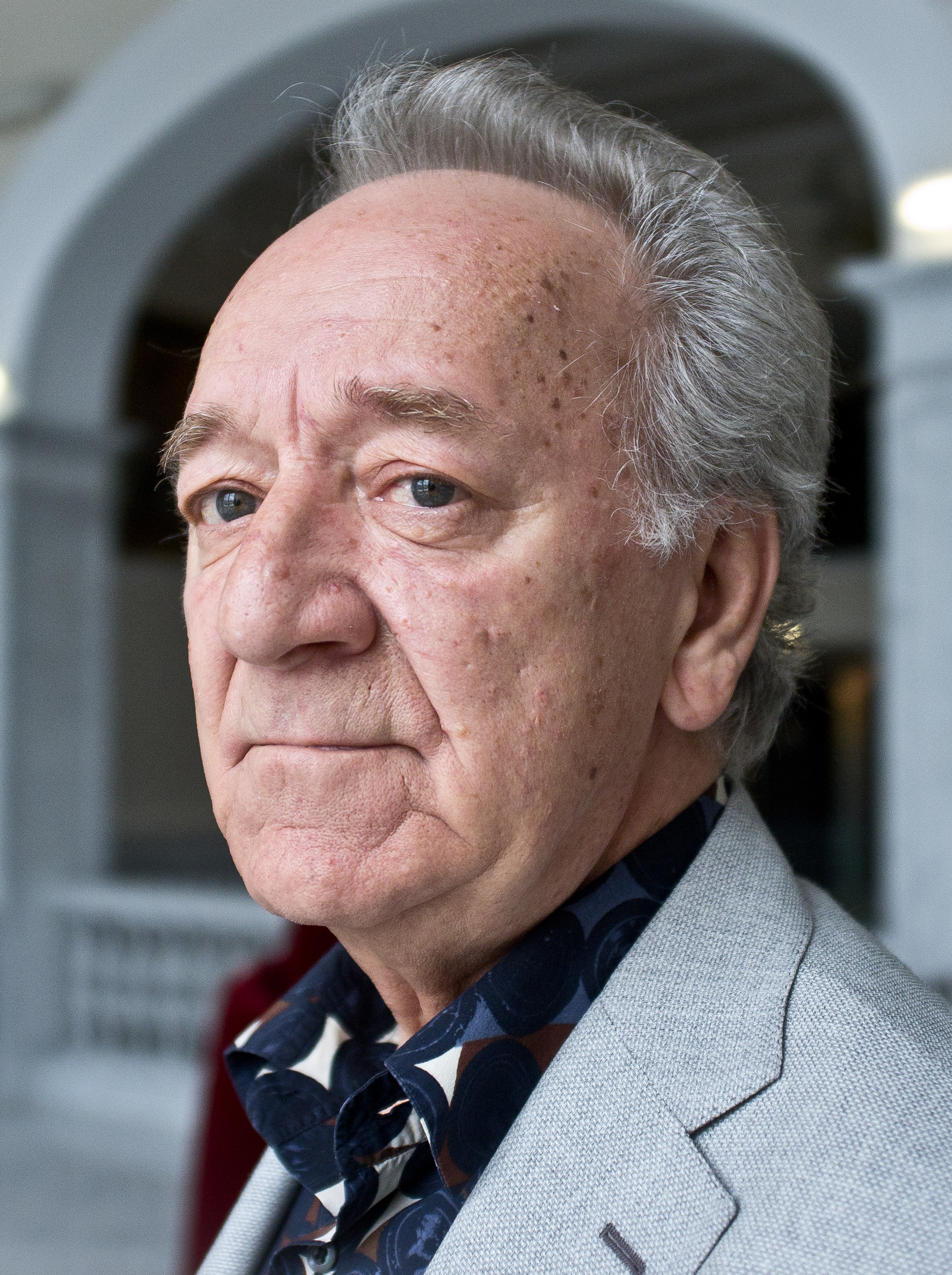
Yuri Temirkanov, the previous Artistic Director of the Saint Petersburg Philharmonic Orchestra

- Hermann Fliege (1882–1907)
- Hugo Varlikh (1907–1917)
- Serge Koussevitzky (1917–1920)
- Emil Cooper (1920–1923)
- Valery Berdyaev (1924–1926)
- Nikolai Malko (1926–1930)
- Aleksandr Gauk (1930–1934)
- Fritz Stiedry (1934–1937)
- Yevgeny Mravinsky (1938–1988)
- Yuri Temirkanov (1988–2022)
- Nikolai Alekseev (2022–present)

== See also ==
- Saint Petersburg Academic Symphony Orchestra
