= Miguel Rosales =

Guatemala-born American architect

Miguel A. Rosales
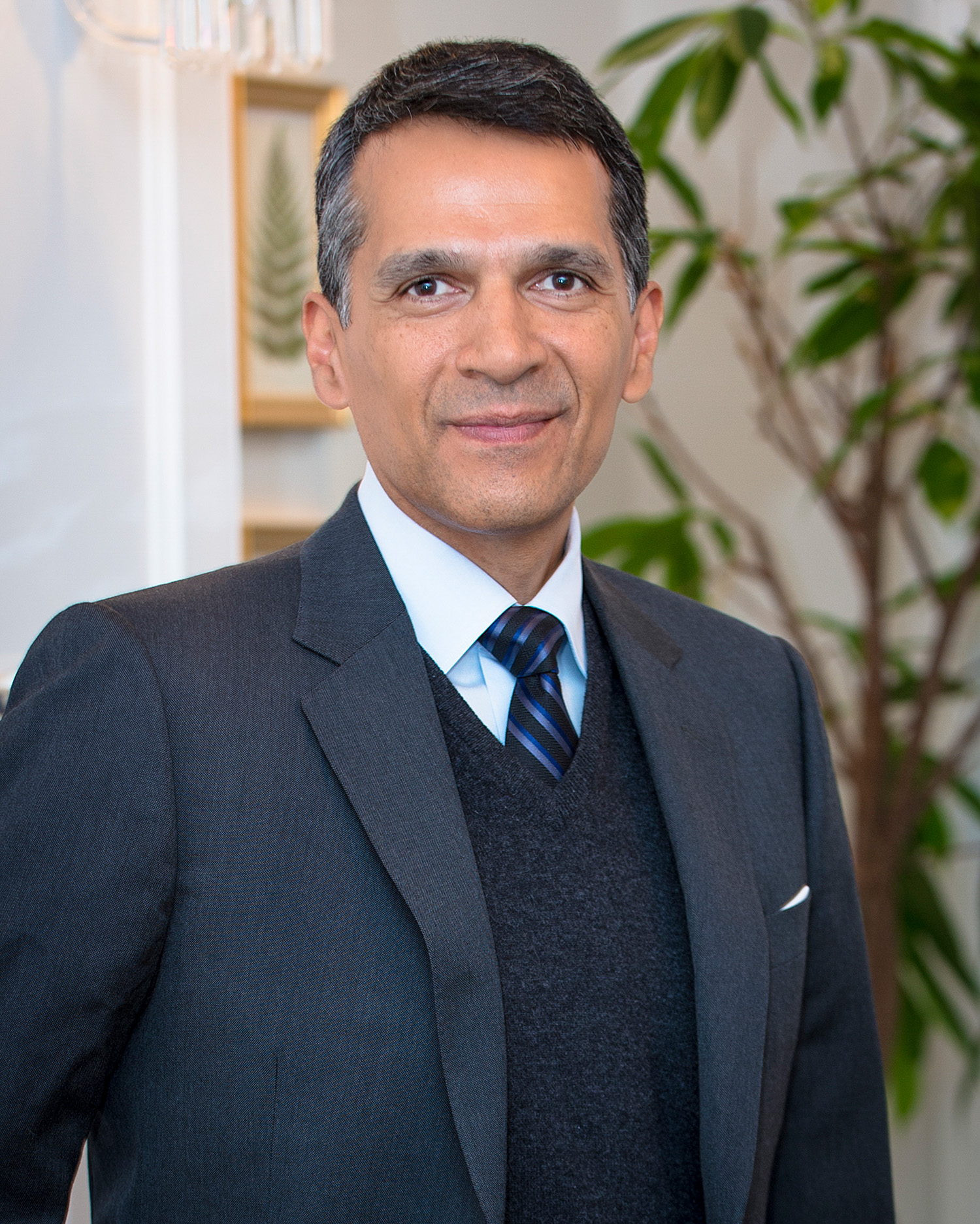
- Born: Miguel Ángel Rosales Izás; 1961 (age 64–65); Guatemala City, Guatemala
- Education: Massachusetts Institute of Technology (SM 1987); Universidad Francisco Marroquin
- Occupation: Architect
- Practice: Rosales + Partners
- Projects: Leonard P. Zakim Bunker Hill Memorial Bridge; Liberty Bridge at Falls Park on the Reedy; Puente Centenario; George Washington Carver Bridge; Woodrow Wilson Memorial Bridge; Phyllis J. Tilley Memorial Bridge; Christina and John Markey Memorial Pedestrian Bridge; Frances Appleton Bridge

Miguel Ángel Rosales Izás (born 1961 in Guatemala) is an American architect specializing in bridge aesthetics and design. He is the president and principal designer of Rosales+, an architecture and engineering firm based in Boston, Massachusetts specializing in the development of design, engineering and architecture projects for bridges, highways, landscape and urban accessibility. Rosales has designed multiple bridges in the United States and internationally. Some examples of these bridges include Phyllis J. Tilley Memorial Bridge, Christina and John Markey Memorial Pedestrian Bridge, and Liberty Bridge at Falls Park on the Reedy River.

== Early life and education ==
Rosales was born in Guatemala City, Guatemala, in 1961, the eldest of four sons of Marco Antonio Rosales, a pharmacist, and Lidia Izás, a homemaker. He earned a degree in architecture at the Universidad Francisco Marroquín in 1984. In 1985 he enrolled at the Massachusetts Institute of Technology (MIT) to study Urban and Environmental Design, completing a Master of Science in Architecture Studies (SMArchS) degree in 1987. While at MIT, Rosales specialized in urban design and planning, elements that later informed his work in bridge design and aesthetics.

== Career ==
Rosales initially worked with Swiss engineer and bridge designer Christian Menn, and from 1988 to 1996, Rosales served as the lead architect and urban designer for the Leonard P. Zakim Bunker Hill Memorial Bridge over the Charles River. This structure is part of the Central Artery/Tunnel Project, informally called "The Big Dig". During his tenure at this project, he mainly focused in improving the appearance of the highways and bridges as part of the project that helped transform downtown Boston by removing an elevated highway and by opening access to the harbor.

In 1997, he started his own independent architecture and engineering professional practice, Rosales + Partners, in Boston. He was involved in the design of three bridge projects: Liberty Bridge at Falls Park on the Reedy in Greenville, South Carolina, completed in 2004, Puente Centenario, over the Panama Canal, Panama, completed in 2004 and Woodrow Wilson Memorial Bridge over the Potomac River in Washington DC, completed in 2008. This latter bridge was granted the Gustav Lindenthal award.

Other projects include the Phyllis J. Tilley Memorial Bridge over the Trinity River in Fort Worth, Texas, completed in 2012, the Christina and John Markey Memorial Pedestrian Bridge, completed in 2013, the Moody Pedestrian Bridge, completed in 2016 in Austin, Texas, the Frances Appleton Pedestrian Bridge and Longfellow Bridge restoration completed in 2018 in Boston, Massachusetts.

In 2001 he instituted the Miguel Rosales Award for the Universidad Francisco Marroquín School of Architecture student with the highest grade point average in his class.

== Design philosophy ==
Rosales’s design philosophy centers on creating cost-effective, architecturally distinctive, and visually engaging structures that contribute to their surroundings. He combines architectural considerations with engineering innovation to realize designs that are both functional and compatible with their context. Born in Guatemala, a country where the general public can not express their opinion about urban projects, when he went to live and work in Boston he realized the importance of prioritizing user experience, with an emphasis on designs that accommodate pedestrians and cyclists and incorporate public spaces when appropriate.

Some projects met initial resistance from local residents, such as the Fore River Bridge. Rosales emphasized that the conceived vertical-lift bridge had technical advantages, and that a huge effort had been made to avoid immense costs and to improve the appearance. It incorporated elements of the 1936 Art Deco-style bridge, including also features like colored lighting at night and stainless steel screening of the towers at either end to make it more attractive.

Rosales' work is raising awareness in communities about the importance of preserving their historic architecture, which continue to inspire great admiration and civic pride.

== Personal life ==
Rosales lives on Mount Vernon Street in the historic Beacon Hill neighborhood of Boston. Rosales also served for five years on the Beacon Hill Architectural Commission.

== Completed projects ==
- 2025: Bill Russell Bridge, Boston, MA
- 2023: East 54th Street footbridge, Manhattan, New York City
- 2019: Frances Appleton Bridge, Boston, MA
- 2018: Fore River Bridge, Quincy and Weymouth, MA
- 2018: Longfellow Bridge, Boston, MA
- 2016: Moody Pedestrian Bridge, Austin, TX
- 2014: Como Park Pedestrian Bridge restoration, St. Paul, MN
- 2013: Christina and John Markey Memorial Pedestrian Bridge, Revere, MA
- 2012: Phyllis J. Tilley Memorial Bridge, Fort Worth, TX
- 2008: Woodrow Wilson Bridge and Maryland Interchange, Washington, DC
- 2008: John Glenn Columbus International Airport taxiway bridge, Columbus, OH
- 2005: George Washington Carver Bridge, Des Moines, IA
- 2005: I-235 Pedestrian Bridges, Des Moines, IA
  - Edna M. Griffin Memorial Bridge
  - 40th Street Pedestrian Bridge
  - 44th Street Pedestrian Bridge
- 2004: Puente Centenario, Panama Canal, Panama
- 2004: Liberty Bridge at Falls Park on the Reedy River, Greenville, SC
- 2003: Leonard P. Zakim Bunker Hill Memorial Bridge, Boston, MA

=== Other projects ===
- Tilikum Crossing, Portland, Oregon; a hybrid suspension/cable-stayed which was recommended by the design committee, but not performed due to costs
- Trio of pedestrian bridges in Cleveland, Ohio:
  - drawbridge at North Coast Harbor,
  - pedestrian bridge leading to Wendy Park at Whiskey Island from the north end of the Willow Street Bridge,
  - S-shaped pedestrian bridge linking the Cleveland Museum of Art and the Temple Tifereth Israel, renovated by Case Western Reserve University as a performing-arts center.
- Northern Avenue Bridge, Boston, Massachusetts
- Harvard Bridge, linking Back Bay with Cambridge, Massachusetts

== Awards and honors ==
- 2009 Gustav Lindenthal Medal: Woodrow Wilson Memorial Bridge
- 2013 Engineering Excellence Awards: Phyllis J. Tilley Memorial Bridge
  - ACEC National Recognition Award,
  - ACEC Texas Eminent Conceptor,
  - ACEC Texas Structural Systems Gold
- 2014 Bridge Awards, category Special Purpose: Phyllis J. Tilley Memorial Bridge
- 2018 Lighting Design Award – Heritage Lighting LIT: Longfellow Bridge
- 2021 Commercial Palladio Winner: Longfellow Bridge
- 2025 Landezine International Landscape Award: 54th Street Bridge and East Midtown Greenway
- 2025: the City of Boston officially declares July 9 ‘Miguel Rosales Day’ in honor of the transformative and indelible impact made on the city’s infrastructure and skyline
