= Charles River Esplanade =

State-owned park in Boston, Massachusetts, U.S.

Coordinates: 42°21′22.42″N 71°4′33.62″W

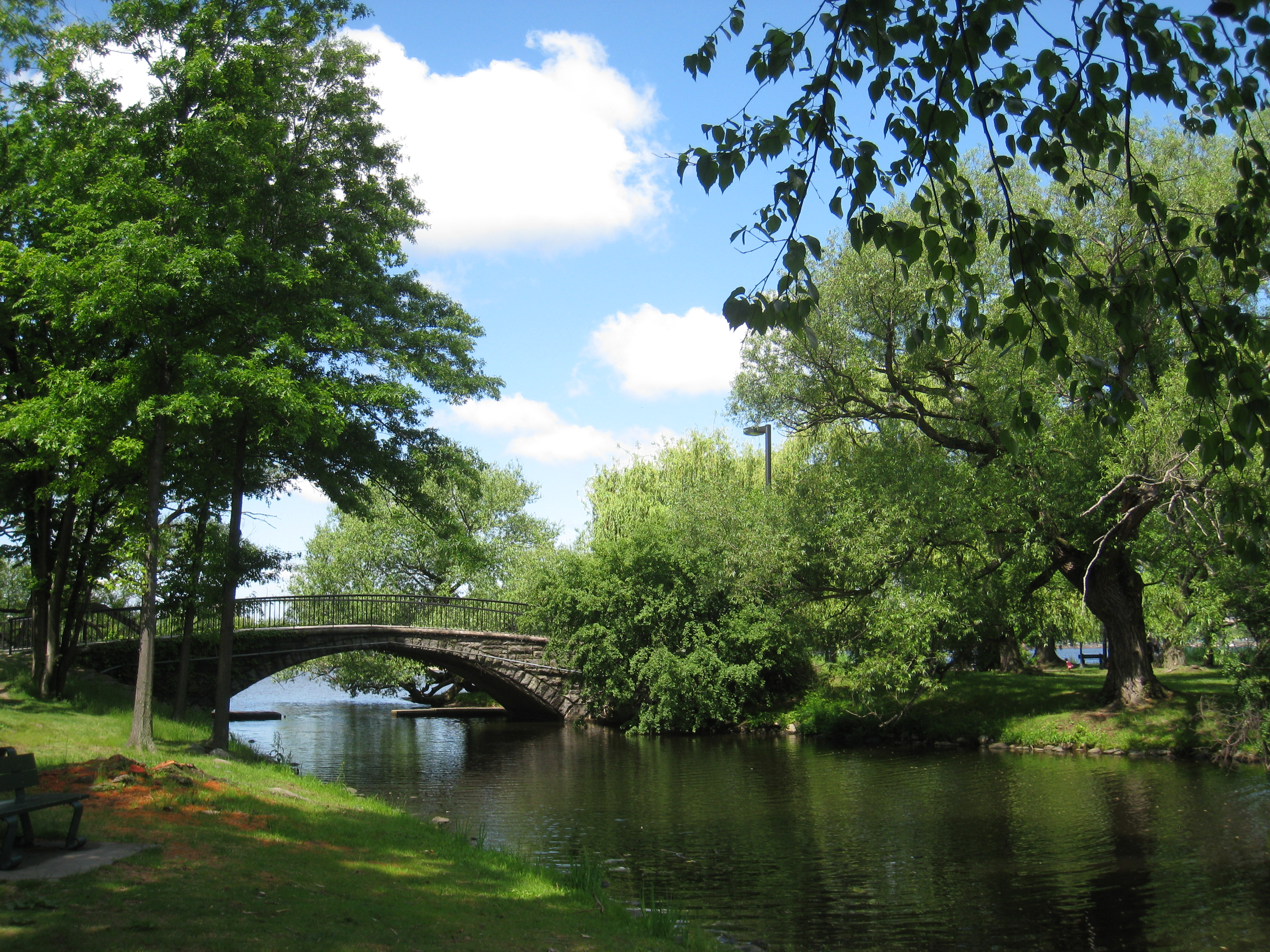
Boston Esplanade, 2009

The Charles River Esplanade is a park in the Back Bay neighborhood of Boston, Massachusetts, United States. Owned by the Commonwealth of Massachusetts, it is located on the south bank of the Charles River Basin and comprises part of the Charles River Reservation. The park was dedicated in 1910 as the Boston Embankment. The Esplanade went through a major expansion from 1928 to 1936.

== Description ==
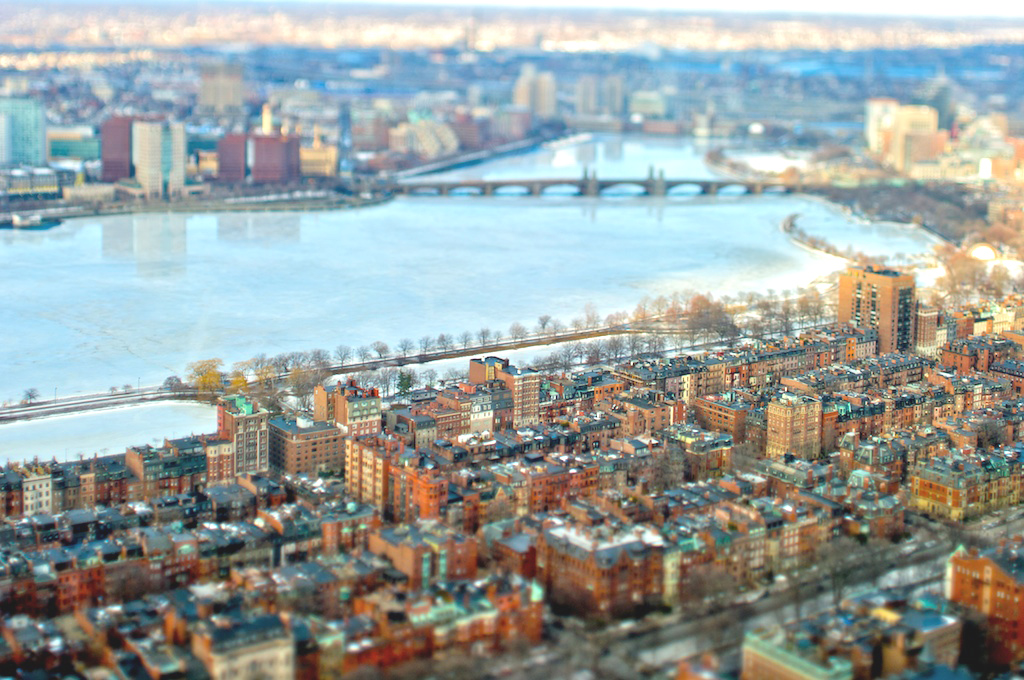
Aerial view of Back Bay, showing Esplanade at near bank of the Charles River, 2009 (with Longfellow Bridge and Kendall Square, Cambridge, in distance)

Storrow Drive, a limited-access parkway, forms the southern boundary of the Esplanade, a scenic park along the Charles River, which marks its northern edge. In the park are walkways, statuary, the Hatch Memorial Shell performance stage, playgrounds, ballfields, and Community Boating. The Esplanade comprises part of the Charles River Reservation state park. The Esplanade was designated as a Boston Landmark by the Boston Landmarks Commission in 2009.

== History ==
The Esplanade was originally dedicated as the Boston Embankment in 1910. The Embankment was created as part of the construction of the 1910 Charles River Dam Bridge (today the site of the Museum of Science). The parkland was criticized for its lack of shade trees, refreshment stands, recreation facilities, transportation utility, and visitors. It extended to Charlesgate (upstream of the Harvard Bridge) and connected with Frederick Law Olmsted's Emerald Necklace system of parks and open spaces. To address criticism, trees, a refreshment pavilion, and concerts were brought to the park.

The Esplanade went through a major expansion from 1928 to 1936, widening and lengthening the park land. These improvements were aided by a $1 million donation from Helen Osborne Storrow, in memory of her husband James. The Storrow Memorial Embankment, designed by Arthur Shurcliff, added the first lagoon, boat landings, plazas, playgrounds, and the Music Oval, where a temporary bandshell was placed. The summer of 1929 was the first year Arthur Fiedler and the Boston Pops performed on the Esplanade.

In 1941, the construction of the Hatch Memorial Shell gave the Pops, and a wide range of other artists and performers, a first-class stage for popular summer events. In the 2000s, half a million people attend the Boston Pops concert and fireworks display held there every Independence Day. The Hatch Shell also hosts free public concerts and movies, and special events—walkathons, races, and festivals such as Earth Day—that draw hundreds of thousands of additional spectators each year.

Sailing on the Charles began in the 1930s, and the boathouse on the Esplanade was built in 1941. Organized in 1946, Community Boating was the country's first public boating program. For a modest fee, thousands of people have learned to sail on the Charles River.

The next major change to the Esplanade began in 1949, with the construction of Storrow Drive. To make up for park land lost to the new road, additional islands including multiple paths were built along the Esplanade, also designed by Arthur Shurcliff and his son Sydney. In the 1960s, the Esplanade was linked to Herter Park in Brighton, and other upstream parks, with the construction of the Dr. Paul Dudley White Bike Path. This 18-mile (29 km) loop travels along the entire basin on both the north and south banks of the river, and makes it especially suitable for biking, inline skating, and running.

== Access ==
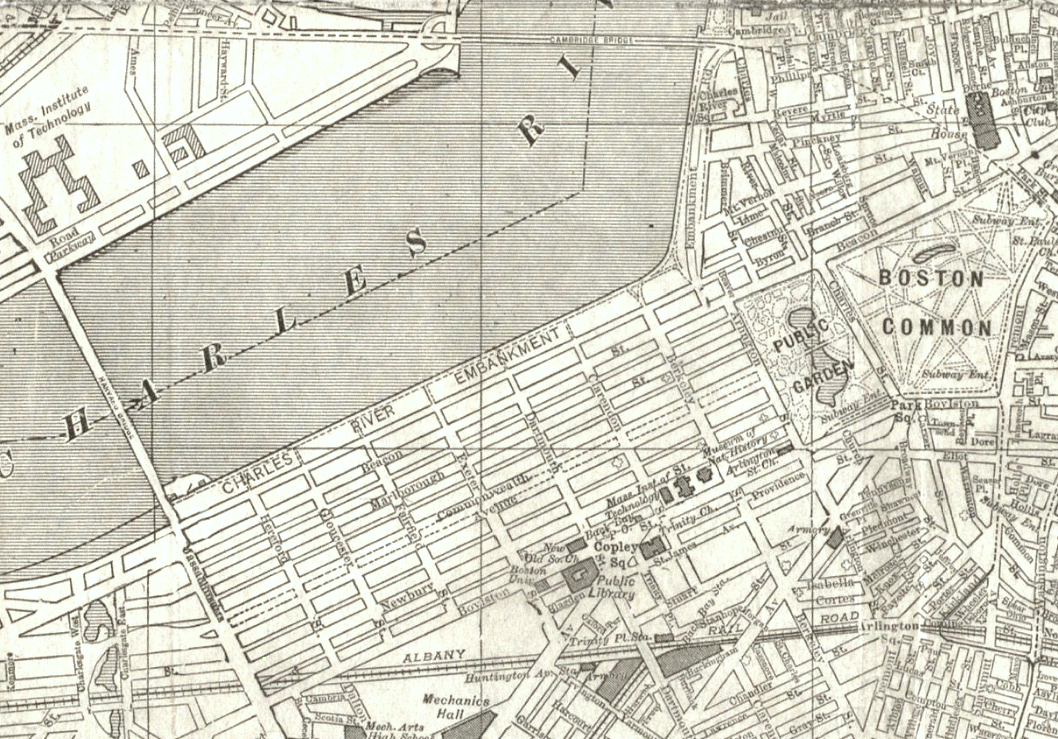
Detail of 1921 map of Boston, showing Charles River Embankment

The Esplanade is isolated from the nearby Boston neighborhoods by Storrow Drive, a high-speed limited-access road protected by perimeter fencing. A series of eight pedestrian overpasses has been built to connect to the rest of the city, plus two additional bridges at the extreme ends of the park. Listed in order from downstream to upstream, they are:

- Leverett Circle bridge (near Martha Road)
- Blossom Street bridge (near Massachusetts General Hospital)
- Frances Appleton Bridge (at Charles Circle, Cambridge Street, next to Longfellow Bridge)
- Arthur Fiedler Bridge (connecting to the Hatch Memorial Shell near Arlington Street)
- Dartmouth Street bridge
- Fairfield Street bridge
- Harvard Bridge (at Massachusetts Avenue)
- Silber Way bridge
- Boston University Marsh Chapel bridge

== Gallery ==
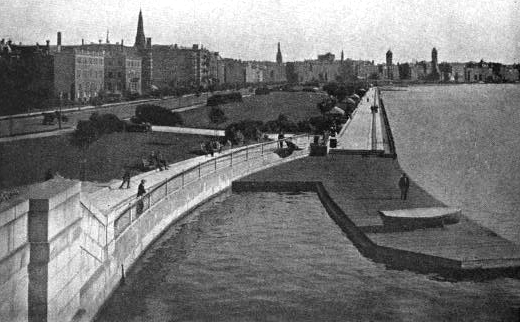
Esplanade, c. 1916

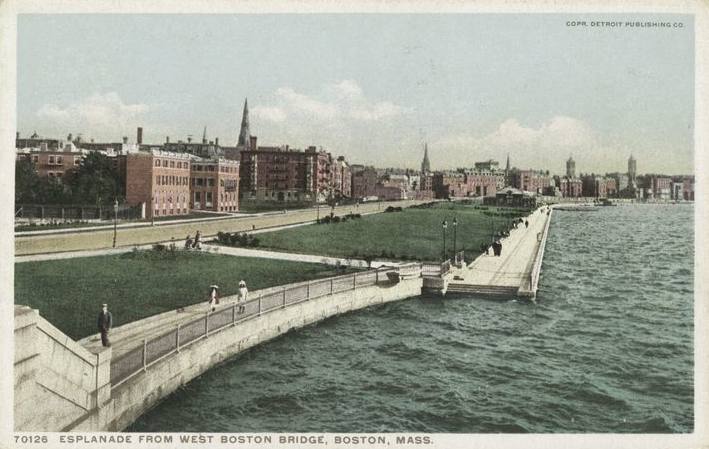
Postcard depicting Esplanade, c. 1910s–1920s

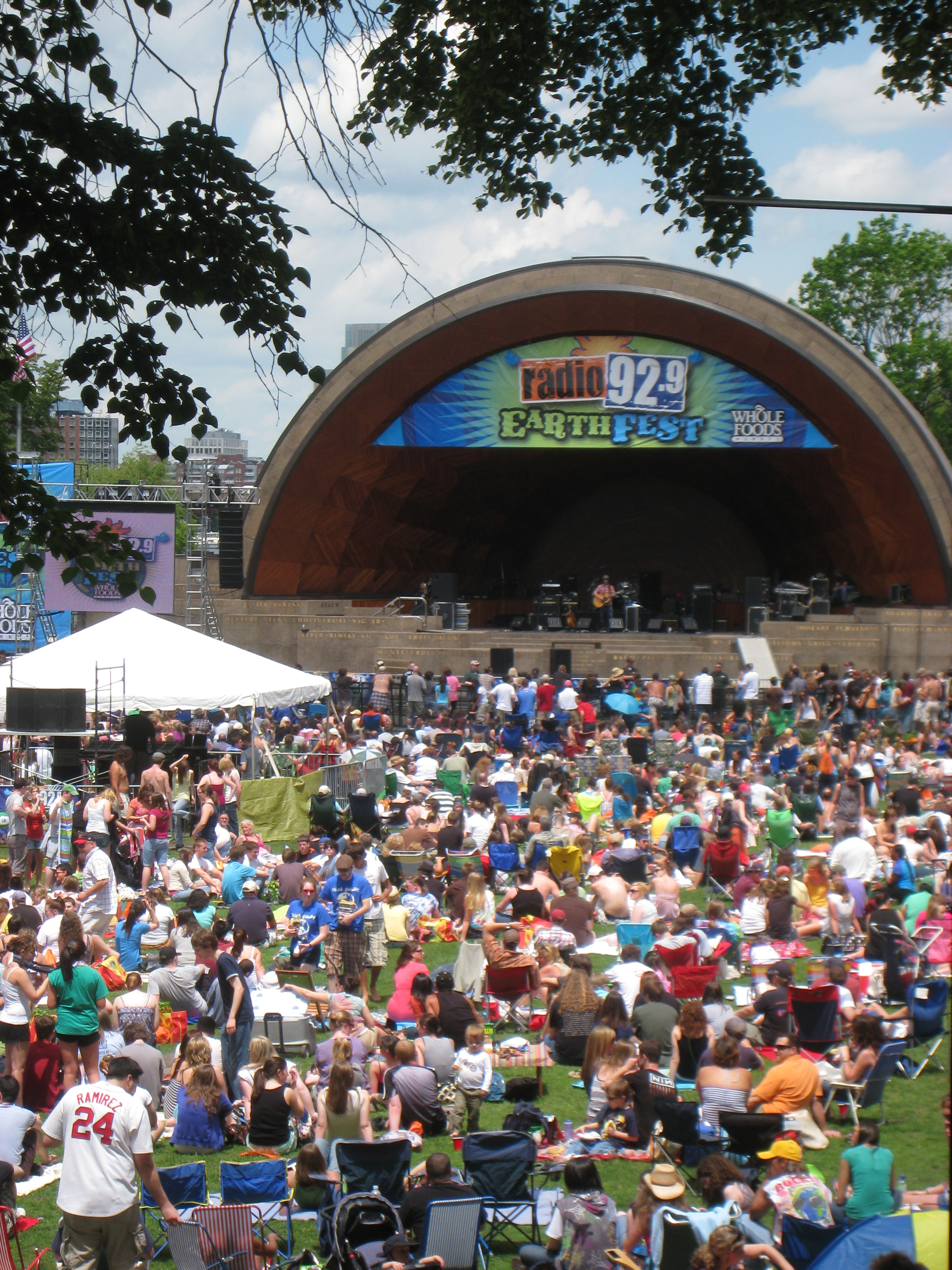
Hatch Shell, 2009

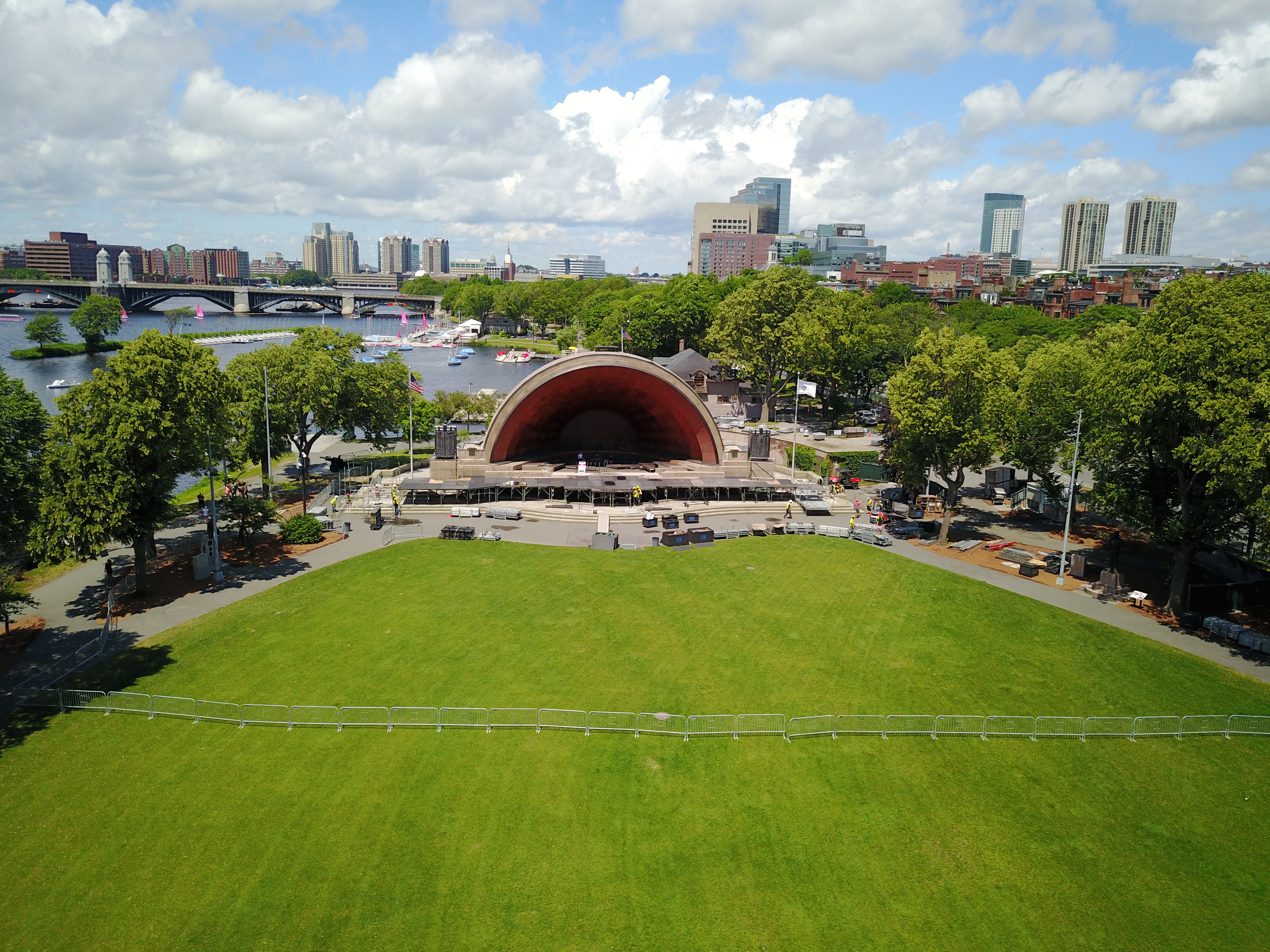
Aerial view of shell on Esplanade

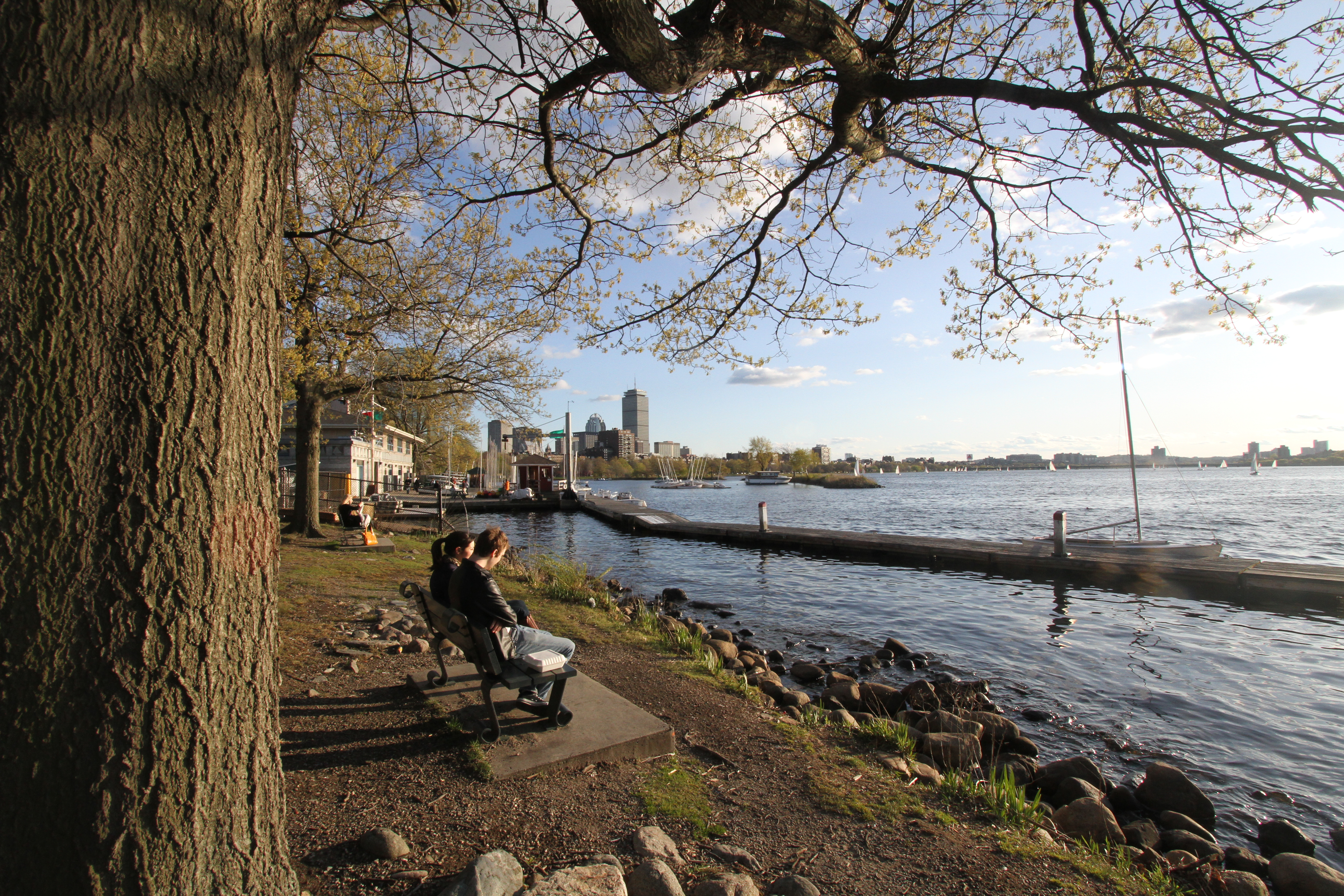
Esplanade, at Community Boating boathouse and dock, 2010

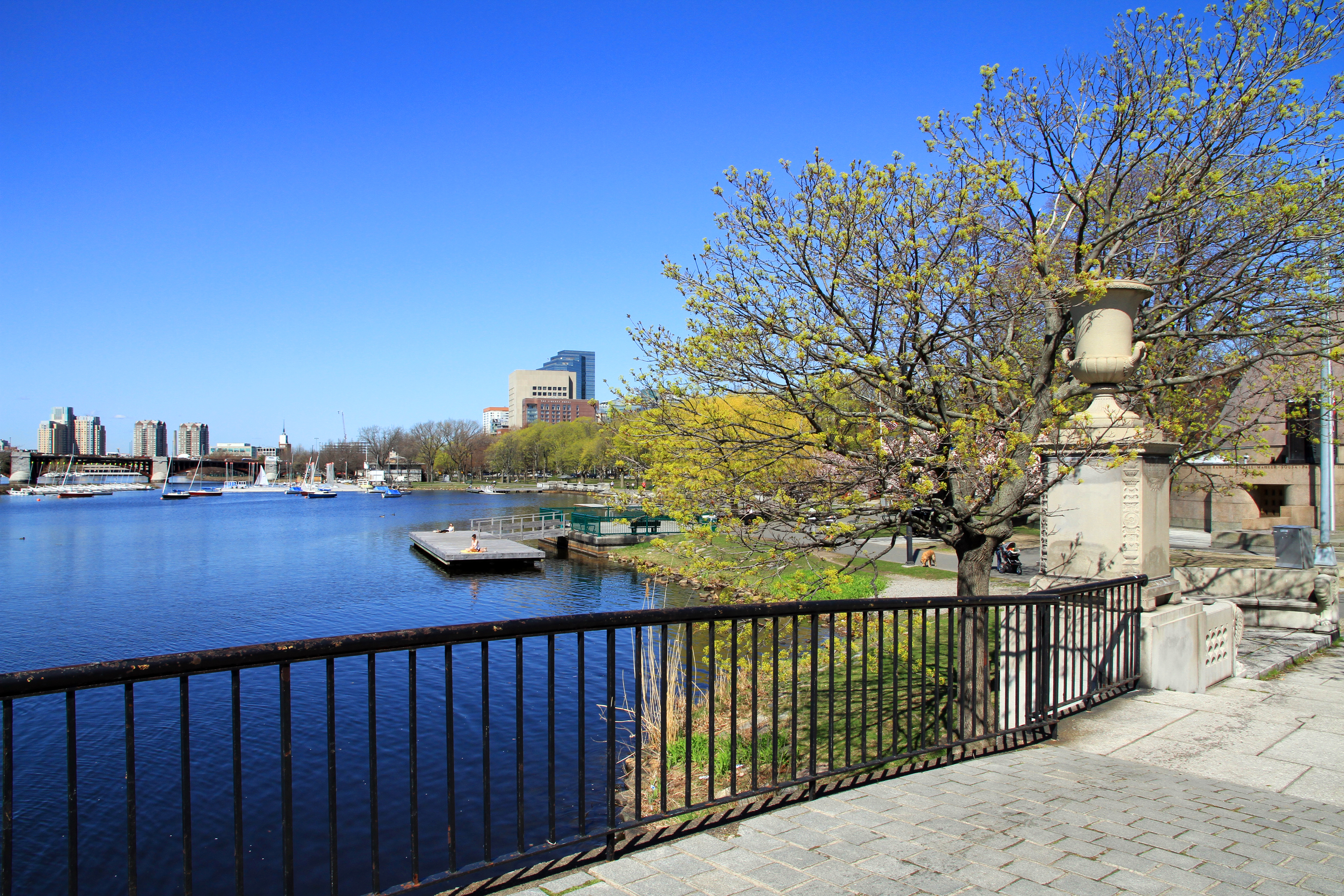
Charles River Esplanade, 2013

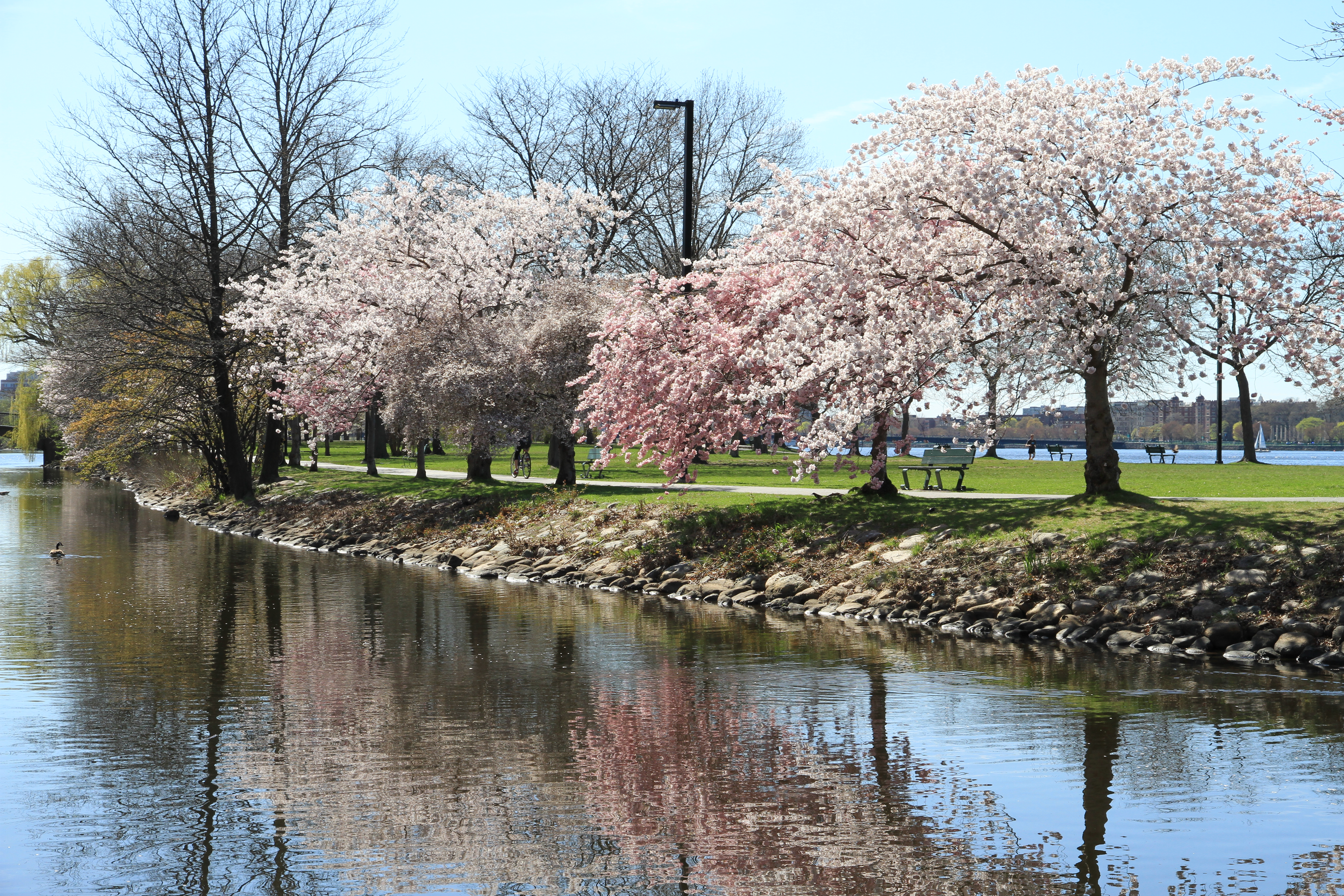
Charles River Esplanade, 2013

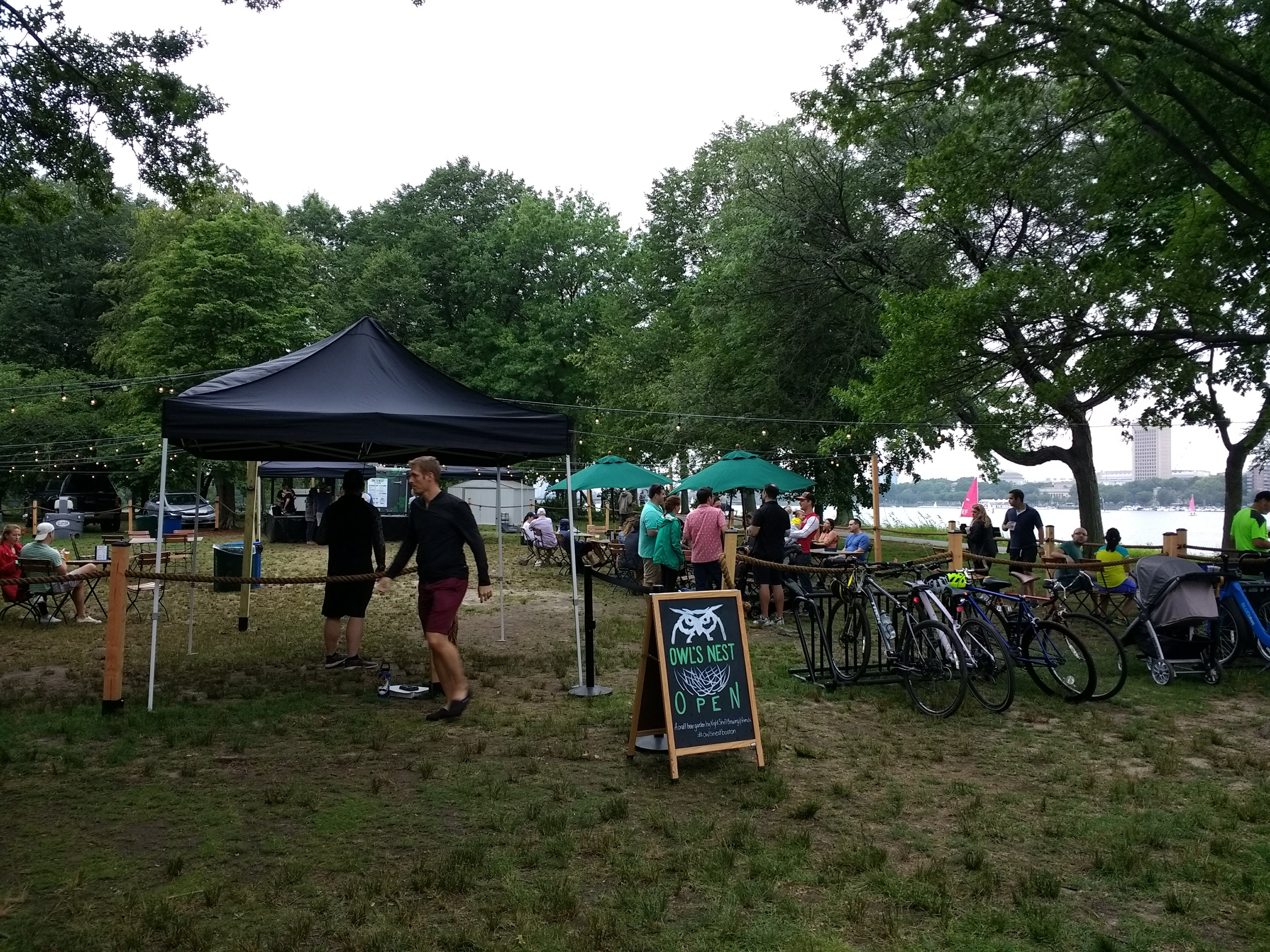
The Night Shift Brewing Owl's Nest Beer Garden on the Esplanade in 2018.
