= Asa Ellis House =

Historic house in Massachusetts, United States

- U.S. National Register of Historic Places
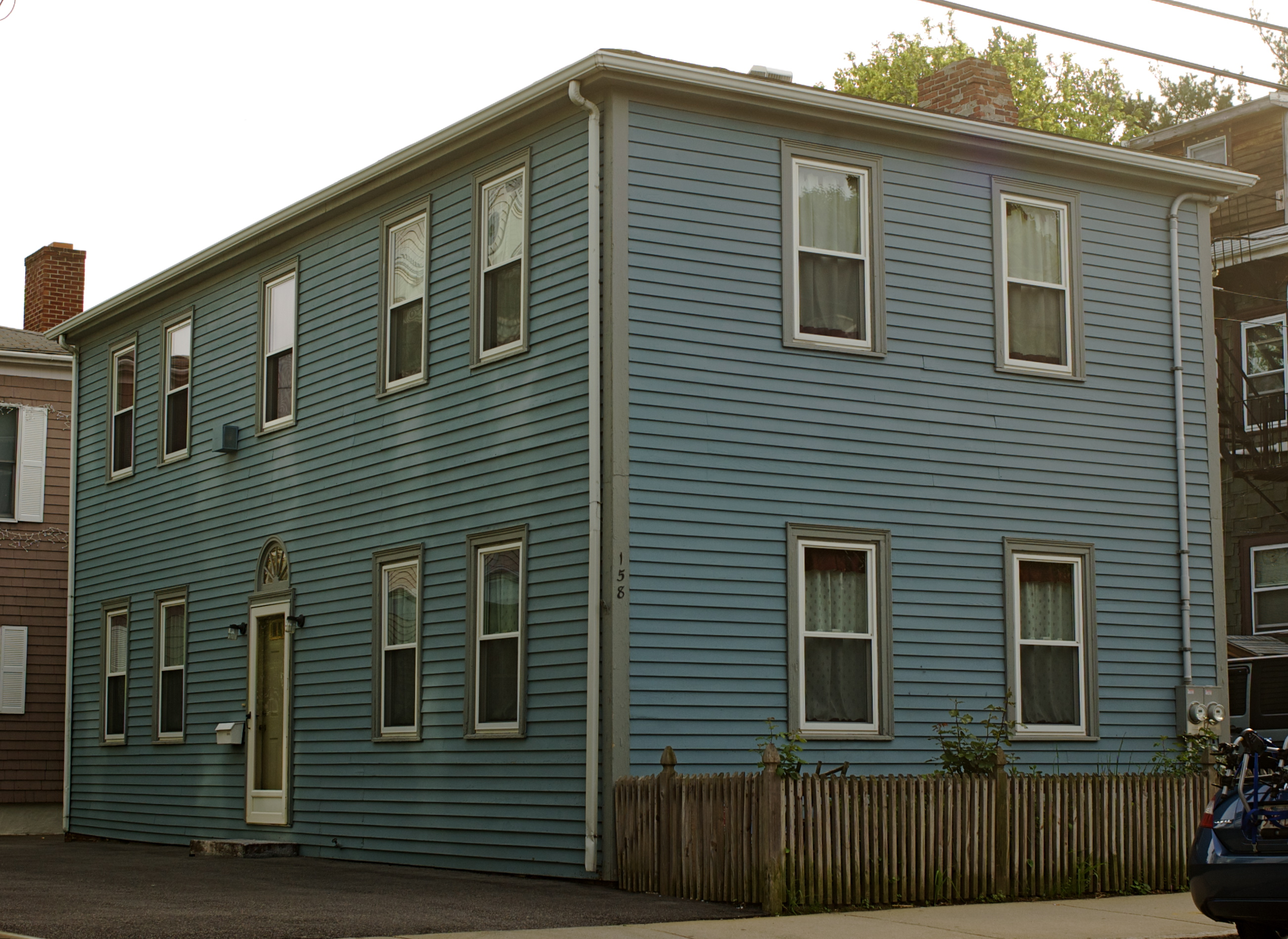

- Location within Massachusetts
- Location: Cambridge, Massachusetts
- Coordinates: 42°21′48.2″N 71°06′18.0″W
- Built: 1805
- Architectural style: Federal
- MPS: Cambridge MRA
- NRHP reference No.: 83000798
- Added to NRHP: June 30, 1983

The Asa Ellis House is a historic house located at 158 Auburn Street, Cambridge, Massachusetts.

== Description ==
It is a two-story wood-frame structure, five bays wide, with a shallow-pitch hip roof. It was built in 1805, and is a rare surviving Federal-style building from the first construction boom in the Cambridgeport area. This development phase resulted from the 1793 construction of the first West Boston Bridge; most of the construction was relatively modest vernacular housing such as this one.

The house was listed on the National Register of Historic Places on June 30, 1983.

== See also ==
- National Register of Historic Places listings in Cambridge, Massachusetts
