= George Washington Carver Bridge =

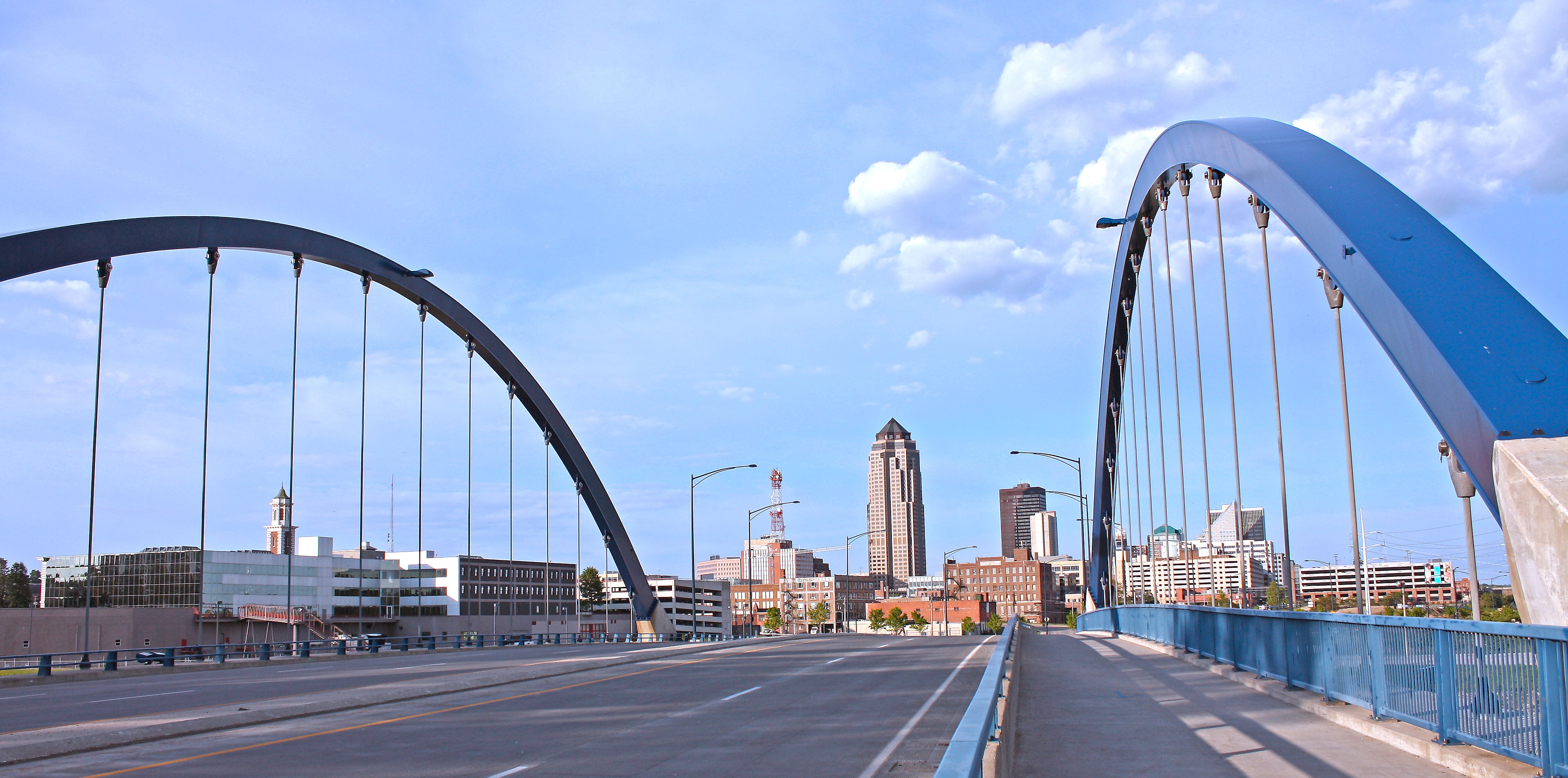
- Coordinates: 41°34′52.5″N 93°38′26.8″W
- Carries: Vehicles, Pedestrians and Bicyclists
- Crosses: the Raccoon River
- Locale: Des Moines, Iowa

Characteristics
- Design: Tied Single Arches
- Longest span: 279 ft (85m)

History
- Construction end: 2005

== Description ==
The George Washington Carver Bridge is located in Des Moines, Iowa over the Raccoon River. Part of the Martin Luther King Jr. Parkway, the bridge provides three roadway lanes in one direction and two roadway lanes and one bikeway/pedestrian lane in the opposite direction framed by two arches. The main supporting structures and free standing arches are visible at the roadway level. The roadway is suspended by cables from two steel arches, painted blue to complement the site's abundant greenery and to clearly mark the river crossing. The arches, with their concrete superstructures, appear to float over the water framing the views of the skyline and Iowa's tallest skyscraper, creating a welcoming gateway to the city from the airport.

== Design and construction ==
The George Washington Carver Bridge was completed in 2004 with Boston-based transportation architect Miguel Rosales of Rosales + Partners providing concept development, preliminary aesthetic design, and community participation for the city of Des Moines. The lead engineering firm for the bridge was Earth Tech Inc.
