= Phyllis J. Tilley Memorial Bridge =

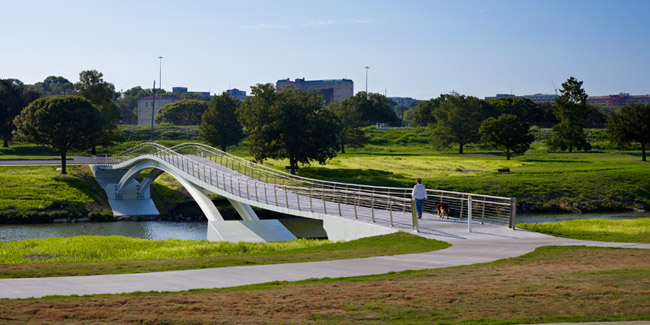
- The Phyllis J. Tilley Memorial Bridge in Fort Worth, Texas
- Coordinates: 32°44′46.1″N 97°20′58.9″W
- Carries: Pedestrians
- Crosses: Trinity River
- Locale: Fort Worth, Texas

Characteristics
- Design: Steel Arch/stressed ribbon
- Total length: 368 ft (112m)
- Width: 12 ft (3.7 m)
- Longest span: 163 ft (49.5m)

History
- Construction start: 2011
- Construction end: 2012
- Construction cost: $2,500,000.00
- Opened: August 25, 2012

Location
- Interactive map of Phyllis J. Tilley Memorial Bridge

The Phyllis J. Tilley Memorial Bridge is a pedestrian bridge in Fort Worth, Texas. It was named in honor of Phyllis Tilley, an advocate for use of the riverfront who founded the Streams & Valleys non-profit organization dedicated to the preservation of the Trinity River.

== Description ==
The Phyllis J. Tilley Memorial Bridge crosses over the Trinity River, connecting Trinity Park to a new trail that terminates in downtown Fort Worth.

This 368' (112m) long steel stressed ribbon/arch combination bridge is the first of its kind in North America. A steel arch with a span of 163' (49.5m) supports steel stress ribbons and precast concrete planks over the river complementing the adjacent historic Lancaster Avenue vehicular bridge. The arch spans the entire river and the steel stress ribbons rest upon the arch. The minimal sag profile of the stressed ribbons creates major tension loads which are balanced against the thrust loading in the opposite direction caused by the steel arch. The balancing of these opposing loads minimizes the required size of the foundations. Pre-fabricated concrete planks have been anchored directly to the steel stress ribbons to form the bridge walkway, eliminating the need for temporary scaffolding in the river and on the adjacent shorelines. The absence of vertical support struts reduces horizontal loads created by periodic river flooding. At night, the bridge is illuminated by a combination of white and blue LED lights.

== Design and Construction ==
The Phyllis J. Tilley Memorial Bridge was completed in 2012, with Freese and Nichols as the lead engineering firm and engineer of record. Bridge architect Miguel Rosales of Boston-based transportation architects Rosales + Partners provided the conceptual design, bridge architecture, and lighting design. The Freese Nichols / Rosales + Partners team also collaborated with structural engineers Schlaich Bergermann & Partner. The contractor for the bridge project was Rebcon, Inc. of Dallas, Texas. Feeney was the main manufacturer. Funding for the bridge was provided by the Texas Department of Transportation, the City of Fort Worth, and local non-profit organization Streams and Valleys, Inc.

== Awards ==
- 2014: NSBA Prize Bridge Competition - Prize Bridge Award in the Special Purpose Category
- 2013: Engineering Excellence Awards - Eminent Conceptor, American Council of Engineering Companies of Texas (ACES-Texas)
