= Christina and John Markey Memorial Pedestrian Bridge =

Christine and John Markey Memorial Pedestrian Bridge
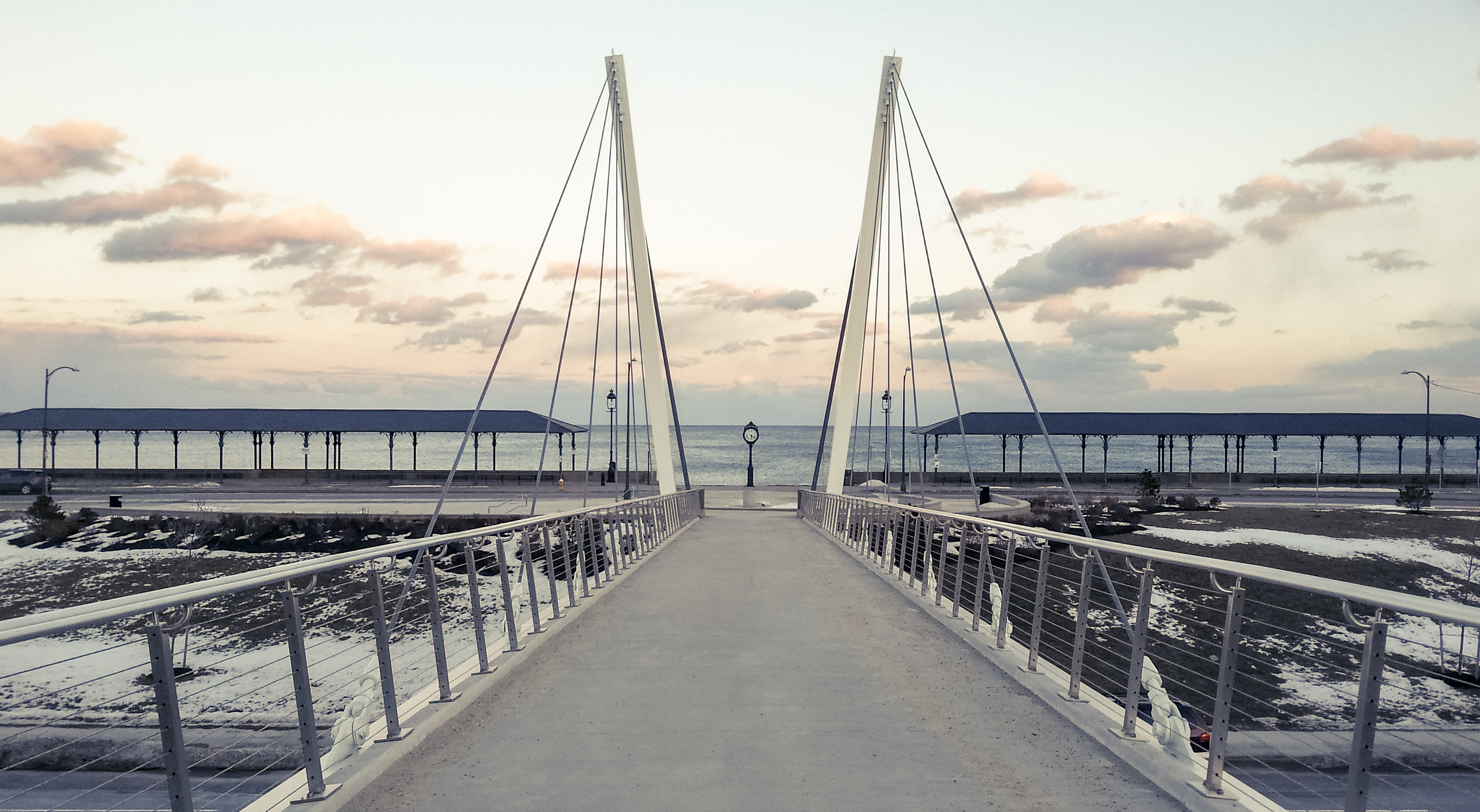
- Coordinates: 42°24′48.40″N 70°59′25.11″W
- Carries: Pedestrians
- Crosses: Ocean Avenue
- Locale: Revere, Massachusetts

Characteristics
- Design: Cable-stayed
- Total length: 151 feet (46 m)
- Width: 12 feet (3.7 m)
- Height: 52 feet (16 m)
- Longest span: 107 feet (33 m)

History
- Construction start: 2011
- Construction end: July 4, 2013

Location
- Interactive map of Christine and John Markey Memorial Pedestrian Bridge

The Christine and John Markey Memorial Pedestrian Bridge is a steel cable stayed pedestrian bridge in Revere, Massachusetts. It was built as part of the Revere Transit Facility and Streetscape Project and opened in 2013. The bridge connects the Wonderland rapid transit and bus station and parking garage with Revere Beach over Ocean Avenue.

== Design ==
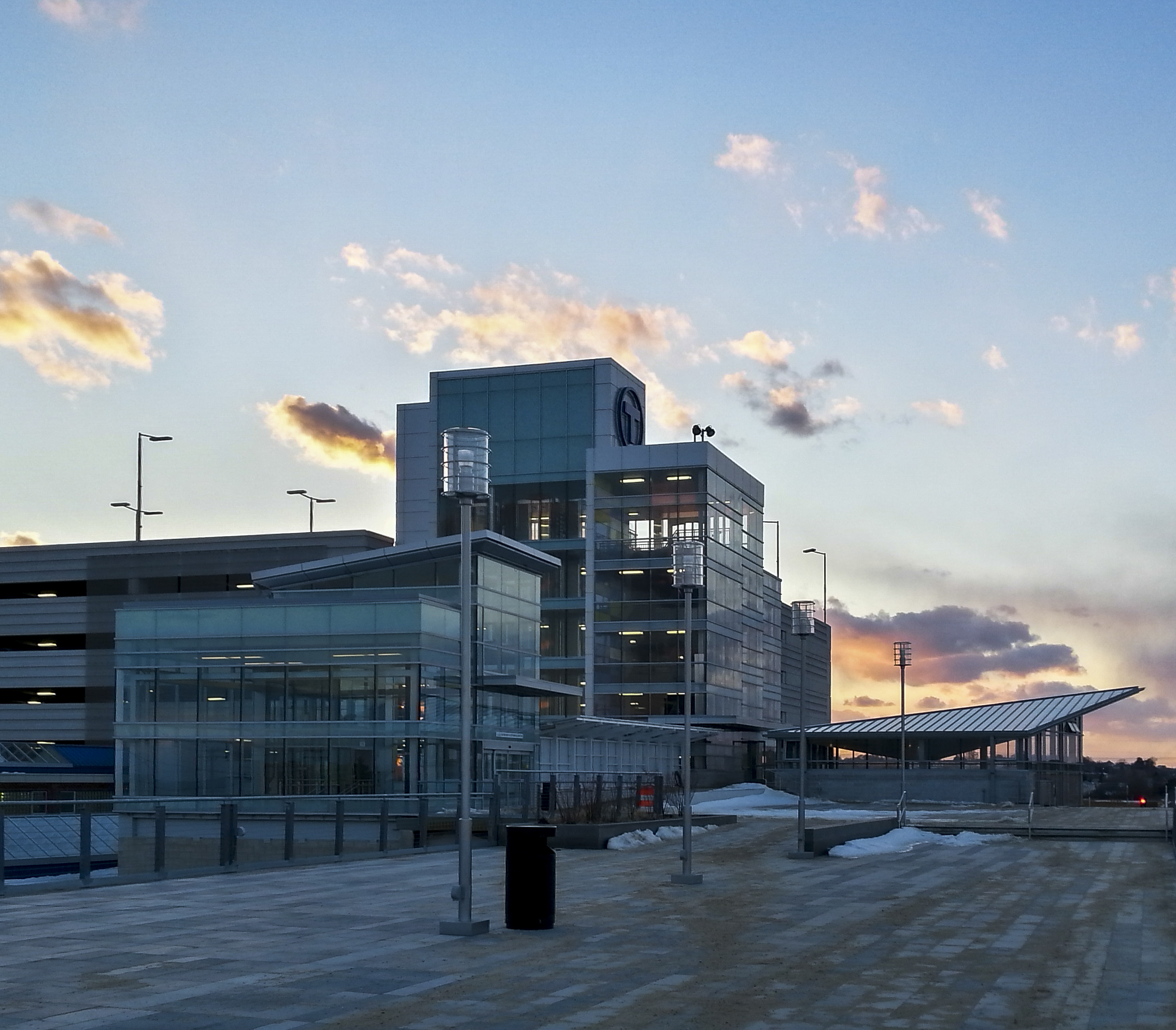
The elevated plaza, built as part of the bridge project, and the Wonderland parking garage

The Markey Bridge is a single-span cable stayed bridge. Its west end connects to an elevated plaza - constructed with the bridge - which is level with the crossover mezzanine of the station. Its east end is at a stone plaza next to Revere Beach Avenue, which runs on an elevated berm. The bridge slopes toward its east end.

The main span of the bridge is 107 feet (33 m) and the overall length is 151 feet (46 m). The 52-foot (16 m) towers and railings are outwardly inclined. The walking surface is concrete with a 12 feet (3.7 m) clear width between railings. The bridge is lit at night from the base using LEDs.

The bridge architect, Miguel Rosales of the Boston-based transportation architects Rosales + Partners, provided the conceptual/preliminary design and bridge architecture. The final design and construction was led by the contractors Suffolk Construction Company in a team that included AECOM as engineers of record and Schlaich Bergermann & Partner as design engineers. The construction and real estate development company Gilbane acted as construction manager for the project.

== History ==
Wonderland station opened on January 19, 1954 as the terminus of what became the MBTA Blue Line. It served commuters from Revere and surrounding towns, as well as providing transit access to popular Revere Beach. In the 1970s, Revere officials began considering a pedestrian bridge to allow beachgoers to avoid crossing busy Ocean Avenue at crosswalks.

During his term as mayor from 2000 to 2012, Thomas G. Ambrosino advocated for improvements to Wonderland station, including a parking garage and pedestrian bridge. $20 million was allocated as part of the 2009 stimulus bill, and a $1 million state grant funded an elevator and massive stone stairs to the bridge from Ocean Avenue.

Construction began in 2011. In May 2012, Governor Deval Patrick signed a bill officially naming the bridge as the Christine and John Markey Memorial Pedestrian Bridge after the late parents of then-Massachusetts representative Ed Markey. Although Markey was partially responsible for securing funding for the bridge, some Revere politicians and residents were unhappy with the naming, as neither Markey nor his parents had ever been Revere residents.

The bridge was dedicated but not opened on November 29, 2012. Primary construction was completed in February 2013, with final components like railings installed over the next several months. Delays due to Buy American provisions slowed the completion of the bridge. The certificate of occupancy was signed on June 28, 2013, and the bridge opened to the public on July 4. The elevator was not complete then and opened later.
