= Moody Pedestrian Bridge =

Pedestrian bridge in Austin, Texas

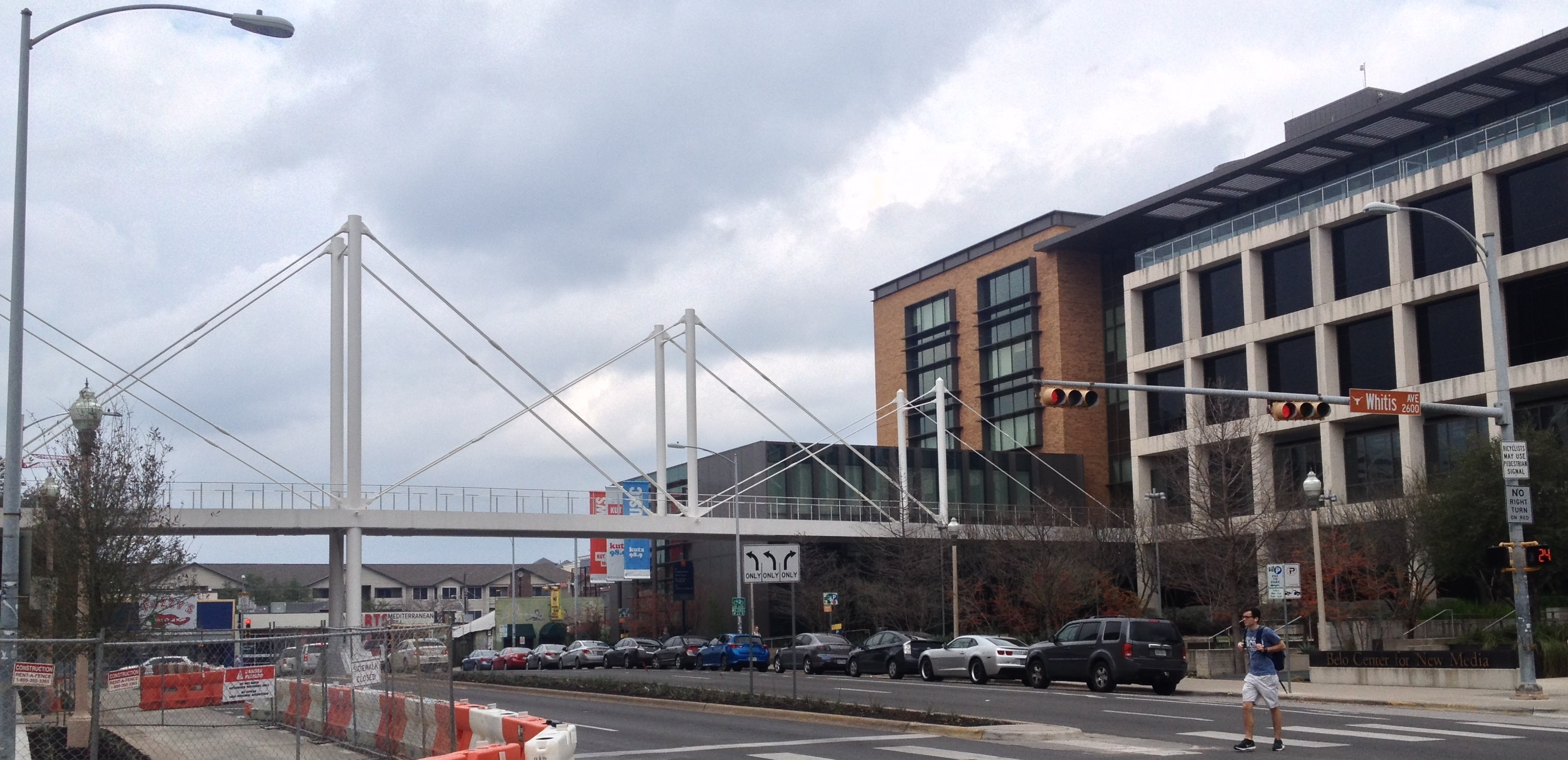
- The bridge viewed from the southeast at street level
- Coordinates: 30°17′23.253″N 97°44′27.128″W
- Carries: Pedestrians
- Crosses: West Dean Keeton Street
- Locale: Austin, Texas
- Owner: University of Texas System

Characteristics
- Design: Fink truss pedestrian bridge
- Total length: 300 feet (91 m)
- Height: 65 feet (20 m)
- No. of spans: 2

History
- Designer: Miguel Rosales
- Engineering design by: Freese and Nichols
- Constructed by: Flintco
- Construction start: 2015
- Construction cost: $2.3 million
- Opened: March 22, 2016

Location
- Interactive map of Moody Pedestrian Bridge

The Moody Pedestrian Bridge is a pedestrian bridge in Austin, Texas on the campus of the University of Texas at Austin. It connects two buildings within the Moody College of Communication across a street.

== Design ==
The Moody Pedestrian Bridge is an inverted Fink truss bridge that connects the second floor of the Belo Center for New Media to the fourth floor of Jones Communication Center buildings A and B over West Dean Keeton Street near the edge of the University of Texas campus. The bridge is supported by a central steel pier standing on the median of the street below, together with a series of steel towers anchored to the deck by tension rods. The overall length of the bridge is approximately 300 feet (91 m), with the highest central towers reaching 65 feet (20 m) high. The bridge has aesthetic lighting integrated into its stainless steel railings.

Bridge designer Miguel Rosales, of Boston-based bridge architects and engineers Rosales + Partners, provided the conceptual and preliminary design, bridge architecture, and aesthetic lighting design. Freese and Nichols was the engineering firm of record. The construction contractor for the bridge was Flintco. Funding for the bridge's design and construction was provided by the Moody Foundation, a charitable foundation based in Galveston, Texas.

== History ==
In November 2012 the University of Texas's school of communication expanded from its buildings in the Jones Communication Center into the newly completed Belo Center for New Media across Dean Keeton Street to the north. To physically (and symbolically) reconnect the college's departments, the college began exploring plans to connect the buildings with an elevated bridge. In 2013 the Moody Foundation donated $50 million to the college, for which the school was renamed the Moody College of Communication; some of those funds were used to pay for the design and construction of the pedestrian bridge.

Construction on the bridge was approved by the Austin City Council in June 2015 and began shortly thereafter. Dean Keeton Street was partially closed to traffic due to construction in December 2015 and January 2016. After some delays, construction was completed and the bridge opened to student and faculty use on 22 March 2016.
