= Fore River Bridge =

Bridge in Massachusetts, United States

Coordinates: 42°14′40.52″N 70°58′1.55″W

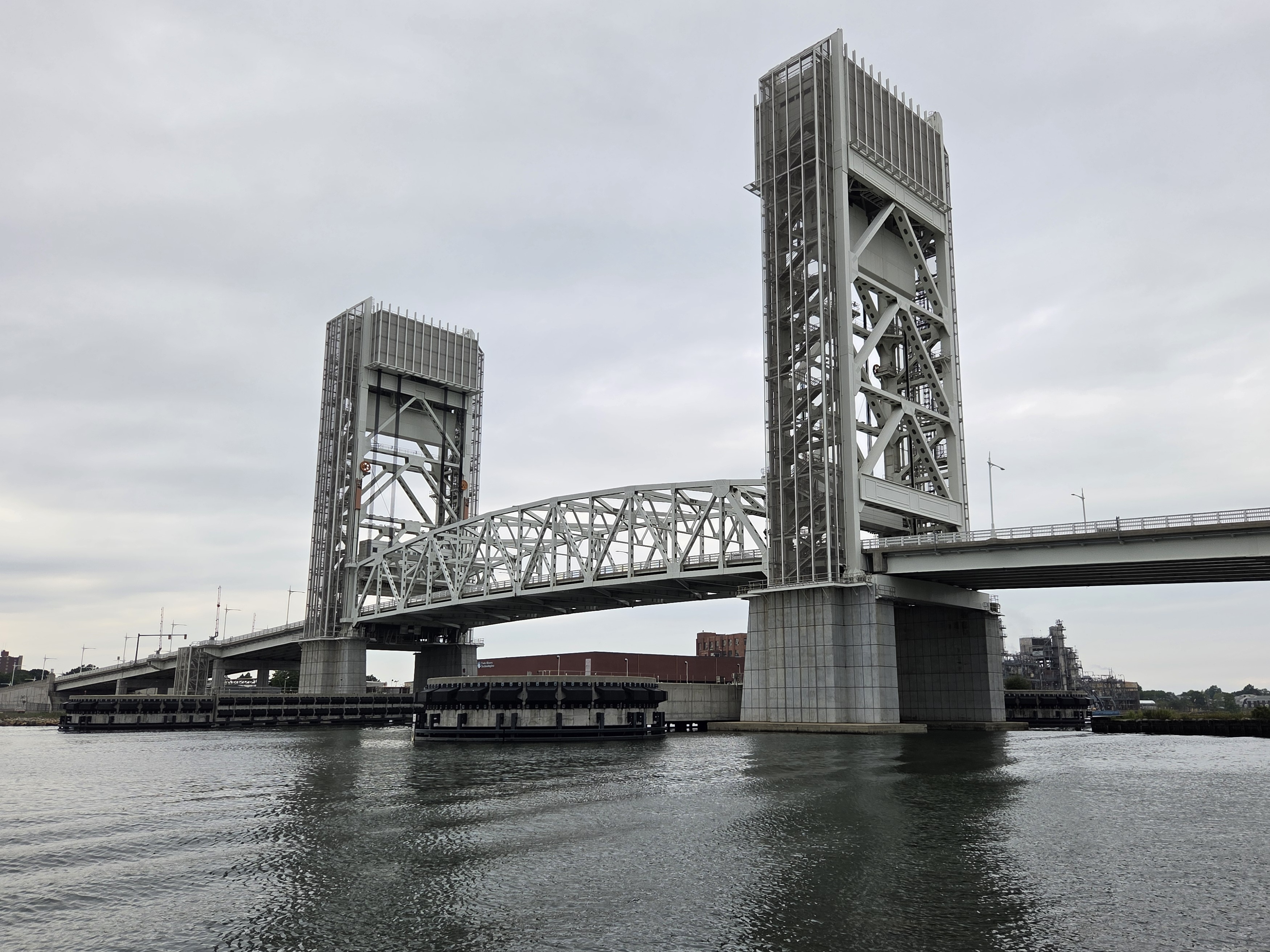
The Fore River Bridge in 2026

The Fore River Bridge spans the Weymouth Fore River between Quincy and Weymouth, Massachusetts. The total length of the bridge including the approaches is 2,216 feet (675 m).

== History ==
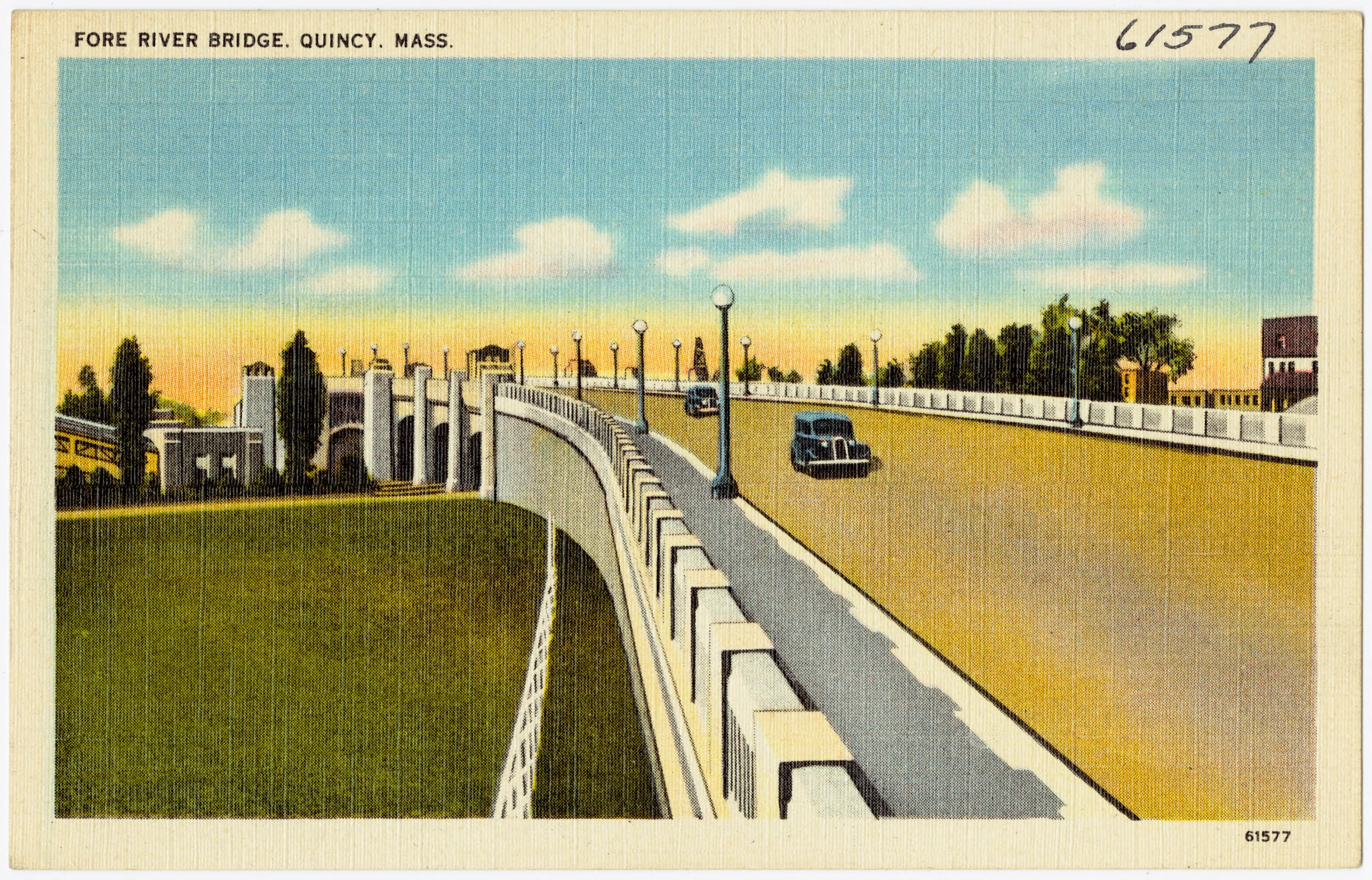
Postcard view of the 1936-built bridge

A bascule bridge was built in 1936, replacing an earlier span. The bascule bridge was demolished in 2004 as it was considered structurally deficient and unsafe.

MassDOT erected a temporary vertical lift bridge in 2001–2003, rising to 200 feet (61 m). The temporary bridge remained in place until the new bridge was completed in 2018.

The new bridge project initially met resistance from residents. Designing architect Miguel Rosales emphasized that the conceived vertical-lift bridge had technical advantages, and that the Department of Transportation had made an effort to improve the appearance. Further, it incorporated elements of the 1936 Art Deco-style bridge, including also features like colored lighting at night and stainless steel screening of the towers at either end to make it more attractive.

The construction of the new bridge commenced when the design/build team (White-Skanska-Koch, Joint Venture) was given notice to proceed in 2012. This project was one of five designated as "Mega projects" under the state's Accelerated Bridge Program. A major milestone was reached in August 2016 when the main span was floated into position.

The replacement Fore River vertical lift bridge has an increased vertical clearance of 60 feet (18 m) in the closed position and over 220 feet (67 m) in the open position. This will help reduce the number of openings during the busy summer months. The navigable channel horizontal clearance increased the previous width of 175 feet (53 m) to 250 feet (76 m) and can now accommodate larger marine freighters providing better access to the Fore River’s Designated Port Area.

The Fore River Bridge was built at an approximate cost of $272 million and construction lasted 6 years with final completion in 2018. A portion of the temporary bridge was donated for use as a short bridge over a river in Perches, Haiti.

== See also ==
- List of bridges documented by the Historic American Engineering Record in Massachusetts
