= Longfellow Bridge =

Bridge in Massachusetts

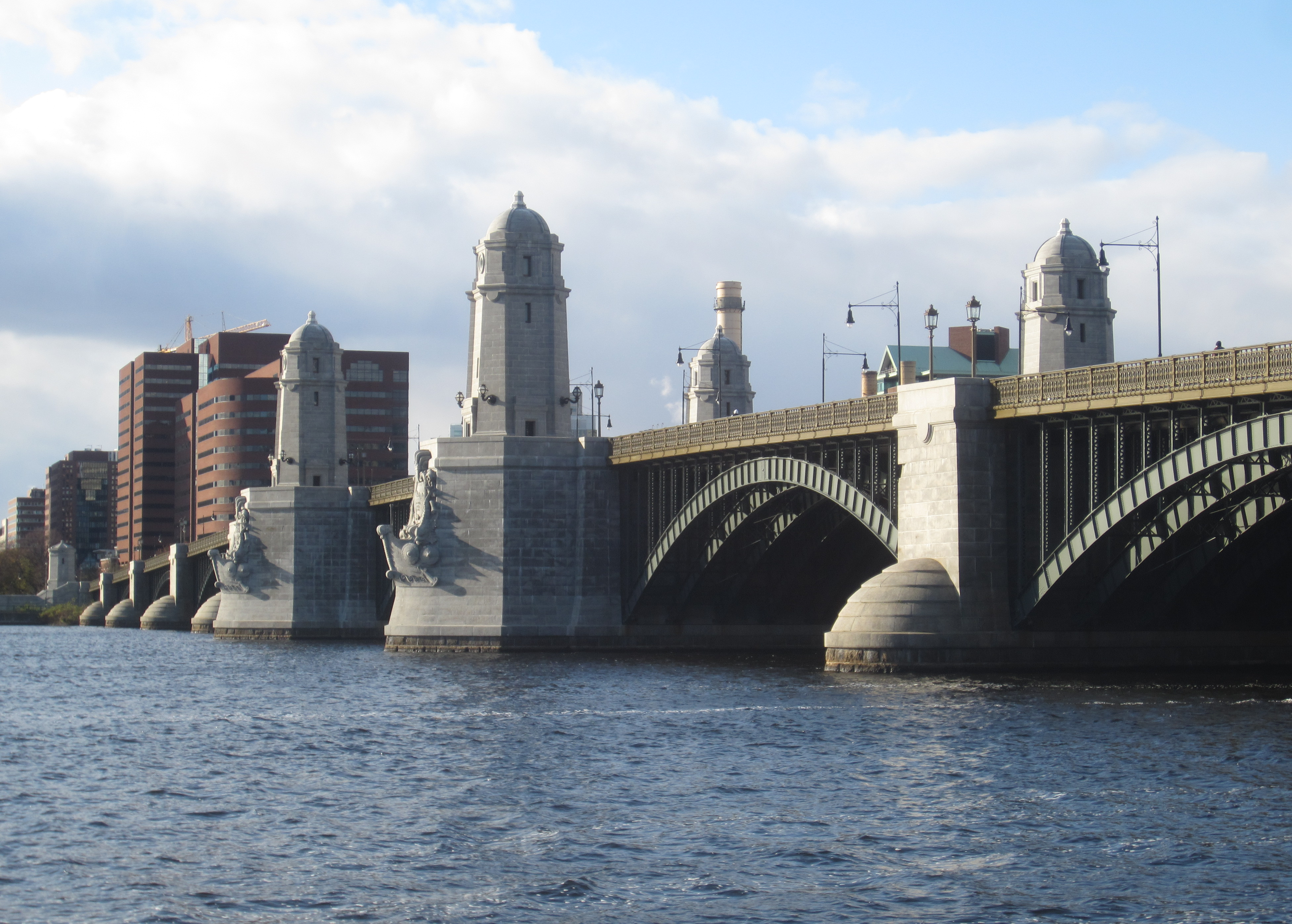
- Longfellow Bridge viewed from the Boston end in 2019
- Coordinates: 42.361635°N 71.07541°W
- Carries: Route 3, MBTA Red Line
- Crosses: Charles River
- Locale: Boston, Massachusetts to Cambridge, Massachusetts
- Maintained by: Massachusetts Department of Transportation

Characteristics
- Design: Steel rib arch bridge
- Total length: 1,767.5 feet (538.7 m)
- Width: 105 feet (32 m)
- Longest span: 188.5 feet (57.5 m)

History
- Construction start: July 1900
- Opened: August 3, 1906
- Rebuilt: 2013–2018

Statistics
- Daily traffic: 28,600 cars and 90,000 mass-transit passengers

Location
- Interactive map of Longfellow Bridge

The Longfellow Bridge is a steel rib arch bridge spanning the Charles River to connect Boston's Beacon Hill neighborhood with the Kendall Square area of Cambridge, Massachusetts. The bridge carries Massachusetts Route 3, the MBTA Red Line, bicycle, and pedestrian traffic. The structure was originally known as the Cambridge Bridge, and a predecessor structure was known as the West Boston Bridge; Boston also continued to use "West Boston Bridge" officially for the new bridge. The bridge is also known to locals as the "Salt-and-Pepper Bridge" due to the shape of its central towers.

The bridge falls under the jurisdiction and oversight of the Massachusetts Department of Transportation (MassDOT). The bridge carries approximately 28,600 cars and 90,000 mass-transit passengers every weekday. A portion of the MBTA subway's elevated Charles/MGH station lies at the eastern end of the bridge, which connects to Charles Circle.

== Design ==
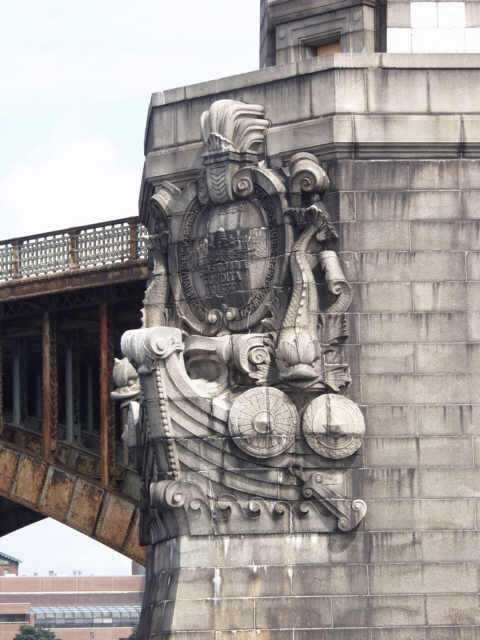
The main piers have sculptures that represent the prows of Viking ships.

Longfellow Bridge is a combination railway and highway bridge. It is 105 feet (32 m) wide, 1,767 feet 6 inches (538.73 m) long between abutments, and nearly one-half mile in length, including abutments and approaches. It consists of eleven steel arch spans supported on ten masonry piers and two massive abutments. The arches vary in length from 101 feet 6 inches (30.94 m) at the abutments to 188 feet 6 inches (57.45 m) at the center, and in rise from 8 feet 6 inches (2.59 m) to 26 feet 6 inches (8.08 m). Headroom under the central arch is 26 feet (7.9 m) at mean high water.

The two large central piers, 188 feet (57 m) long and 53 feet 6 inches (16.31 m) wide, feature four carved, ornamental stone towers. The towers are ornamented with the prows of Viking ships, carved in granite. They refer to a purported voyage by Leif Eriksson up the Charles River circa 1000 AD, promoted at the time by Harvard professor Eben Horsford. The piers are also decorated with the city seals of Boston and Cambridge.

The Longfellow Bridge provides a panoramic view of the Boston skyline. In commenting on riding the Red Line over the bridge, the Boston Globe praised its "view of Boston’s beauty in a single, satisfying gulp".

== History ==
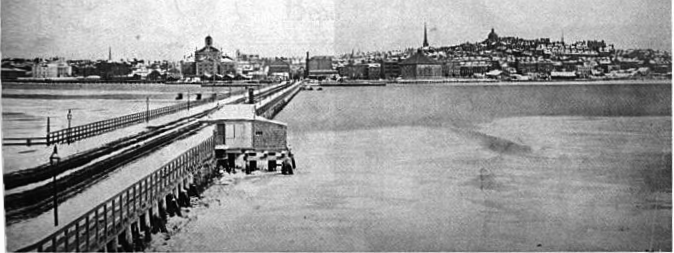
The predecessor West Boston Bridge, c. 1864

The first river crossing at this site was a ferry, first run in the 1630s. The West Boston Bridge (a toll bridge) was constructed in 1793 by a group of private investors with a charter from the Commonwealth. At the time, there were only a handful of buildings in East Cambridge. The opening of the bridge caused a building boom along Main Street in Cambridge, which connected the bridge to Old Cambridge. In East Cambridge, new streets were laid out and land was reclaimed from the swamps along the Charles River. The Cambridge and Concord Turnpike (now Broadway) was connected to the bridge's western approach around 1812. The bridge became toll-free on January 30, 1858. The first horsecar line in Boston, the Cambridge Railroad running between Bowdoin Square and Harvard Square over the West Boston Bridge, opened on March 26, 1856. The bridge was the primary Boston–Cambridge link for the growing horsecar system, which was eventually consolidated as the West End Street Railway. The Harvard Square–Bowdoin Square line was electrified on February 16, 1889, by the West End - the second of its Boston-area lines to be so equipped.

In 1898, the Cambridge Bridge Commission was created to construct "a new bridge across Charles River, to be known as Cambridge Bridge, at, upon, or near the site of the so-called West Boston Bridge... suitable for all the purposes of ordinary travel between said cities, and for the use of the elevated and surface cars of the Boston Elevated Railway Company." At its first meeting on June 16, 1898, Willam Jackson was appointed Chief Engineer; shortly afterward Edmund M. Wheelwright was appointed Consulting Architect. Both then traveled to Europe, where they made a thorough inspection of notable bridges in France, Germany, Austria and Russia. Upon their return, they prepared studies of various types of bridges, including bridges of stone and steel arch spans. Wheelwright had been inspired by the 1893 Columbian Exposition and was attempting to emulate the great bridges of Europe.

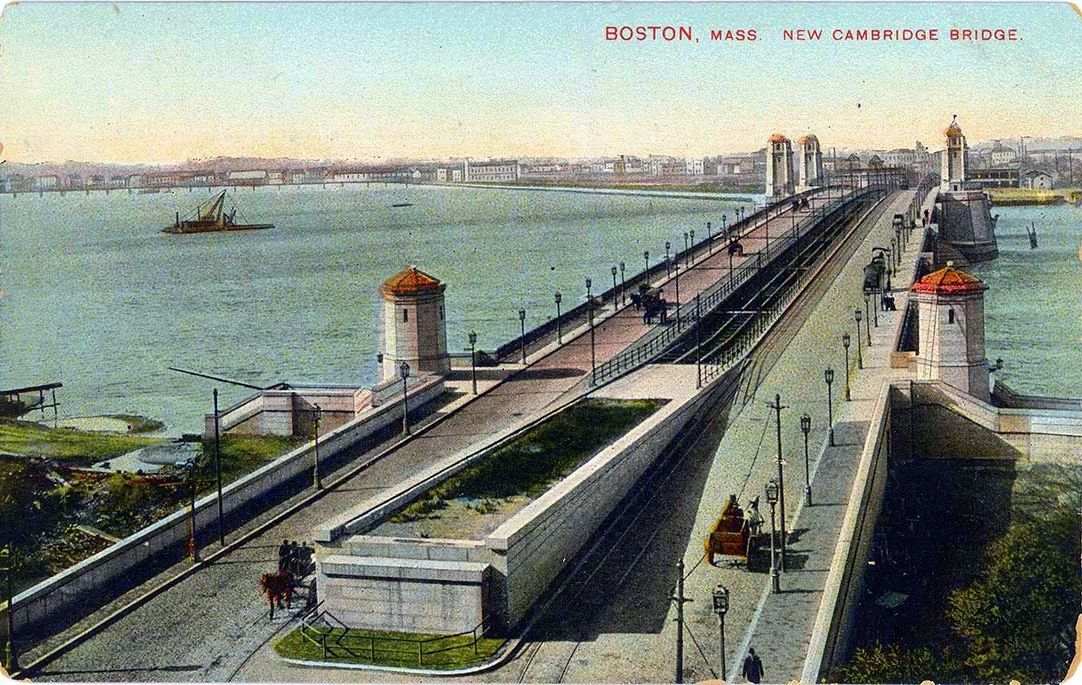
The new Cambridge Bridge viewed from Boston, sometime between 1906 and 1912. Streetcar tracks can be seen on each side, but the central rapid transit tracks are not yet in use.

Although both state and national regulations at the time required a draw bridge, it became evident that a bridge without a draw would be cheaper, better-looking, and avoid disruption to traffic. The state altered its regulations accordingly, and after the War Department declined to follow suit, the United States Congress drew up an act permitting the bridge, which President William McKinley signed on March 29, 1900. Construction began in July 1900; the bridge opened to traffic in August 1906, and was formally dedicated on July 31, 1907.

The Cambridge Bridge was renamed Longfellow Bridge in 1927, by the Massachusetts General Court to honor Henry Wadsworth Longfellow, who had written about the predecessor West Boston Bridge in his 1845 poem "The Bridge".

There are pedestrian stairs on both sides of the bridge at both ends adorned with stone towers. Originally, these led to the Charles River shoreline, and on the Cambridge side they still do. On the Boston side, the construction of Storrow Drive in 1950-51 moved the shoreline, so that the stairs now lead to isolated parcels of land cut off from the river by Storrow Drive. There is no way to exit the upstream parcel, due to an off-ramp; the downstream one includes a crosswalk past another off-ramp. To reach the Charles River Esplanade, pedestrians must now proceed along the sidewalk to the end of the bridge, and use the Frances Appleton Bridge, a wheelchair-accessible pedestrian bridge, at Charles Circle slightly south of the Longfellow Bridge.

The new bridge was built with streetcar tracks plus an initially unused center reservation. On March 23, 1912, the Cambridge–Dorchester line (now the Red Line) opened from Harvard Square to Park Street, with tracks on the bridge reservation connecting the Cambridge tunnel with the Beacon Hill tunnel. Streetcar traffic over the bridge was greatly reduced by the subway line; on December 14, 1925, the final streetcar route over the bridge was replaced by a Kendall Square–Bowdoin Square bus route. Charles station opened at the Boston end of the bridge on February 27, 1932, serving the West End and Massachusetts General Hospital; the bus route was discontinued. From 1924 to 1952, non-revenue trains from the East Boston Tunnel ran on the streetcar tracks over the bridge, switching onto the Cambridge–Dorchester line tracks near the Cambridge end. These moves, usually performed late at night, allow trains to reach the Eliot Shops, as the East Boston Tunnel had no heavy maintenance facility. Both streetcar tracks were used until the 1930s, when the south track was removed.

=== Neglect ===
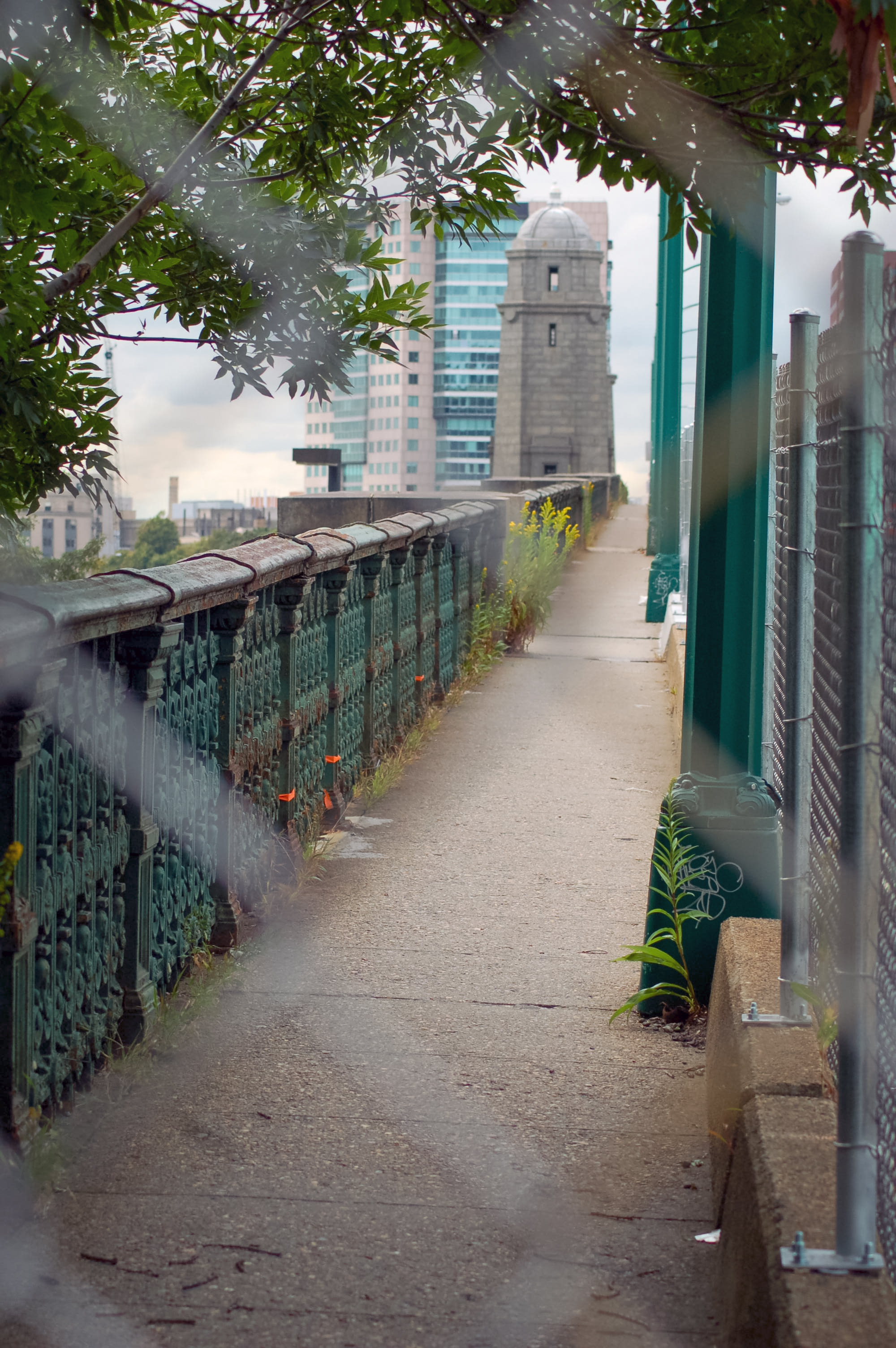
The fenced-off sidewalk on the south side of the bridge, pre-restoration

The Longfellow Bridge, like many bridges in the Commonwealth, deteriorated into a state of disrepair. Between 1907 and 2011, the only major maintenance conducted on the bridge had been a small 1959 rehabilitation project and some lesser repairs done in 2002.

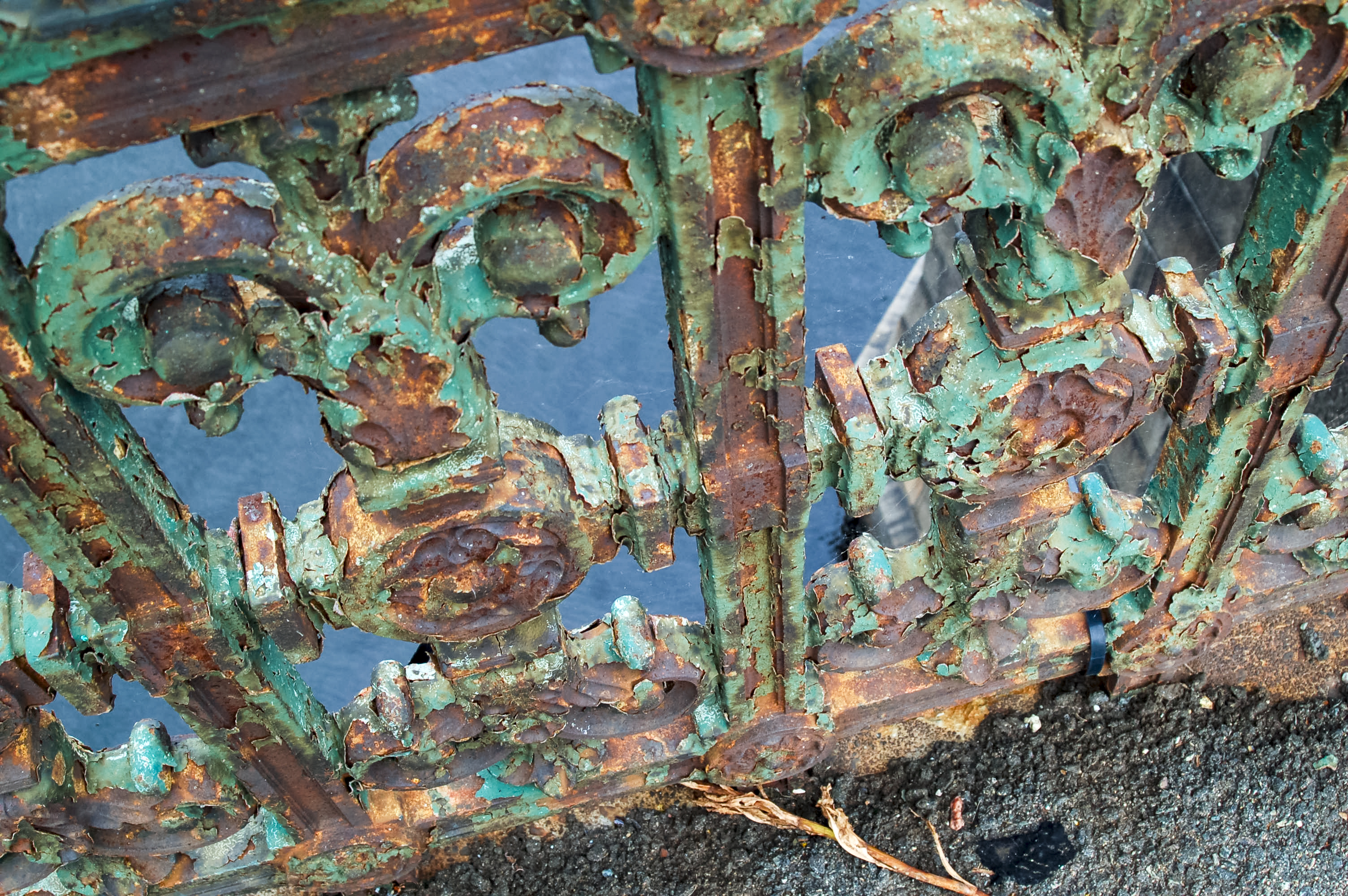
Paint chipping off the degraded railing

In mid-2008, two state employees stole 2,347 feet (715 m) of decorative iron trim that had been removed from the bridge for refurbishment, and sold it for scrap. The men, one of whom was a Department of Conservation and Recreation district manager, were charged with receiving $12,147 for the historic original parapet coping. The estimated cost to remake the pieces, scheduled for replication by 2012, was over $500,000. The men were later convicted in September 2009.

In mid-2008, the western sidewalk and inner traffic lane were both closed, the Red Line subway was limited to 10 miles per hour (16 km/h), and Fourth-of-July fireworks-watchers were banned from the bridge because of concerns that the bridge might collapse under the weight and vibration of heavy use. The speed restriction was lifted in August 2008, and the lane and sidewalk were reopened later on. On August 4, 2008, Governor Deval Patrick signed into law a $3 billion Massachusetts bridge repair funding package he had sponsored. The funds raised from the sale of bonds were used to pay for the rehabilitation of the Longfellow Bridge, the preliminary cost estimated at $267.5 million. If bridge maintenance had instead been performed regularly, the total estimated historical cost would have been about $81 million. Design began in Spring 2005; construction was expected to begin in Spring 2012 and end in Spring 2016.

Ownership and management of the overhaul was transferred from the Department of Conservation and Recreation (DCR) to the new Massachusetts Department of Transportation (MassDOT) on November 1, 2009, along with other DCR bridges.

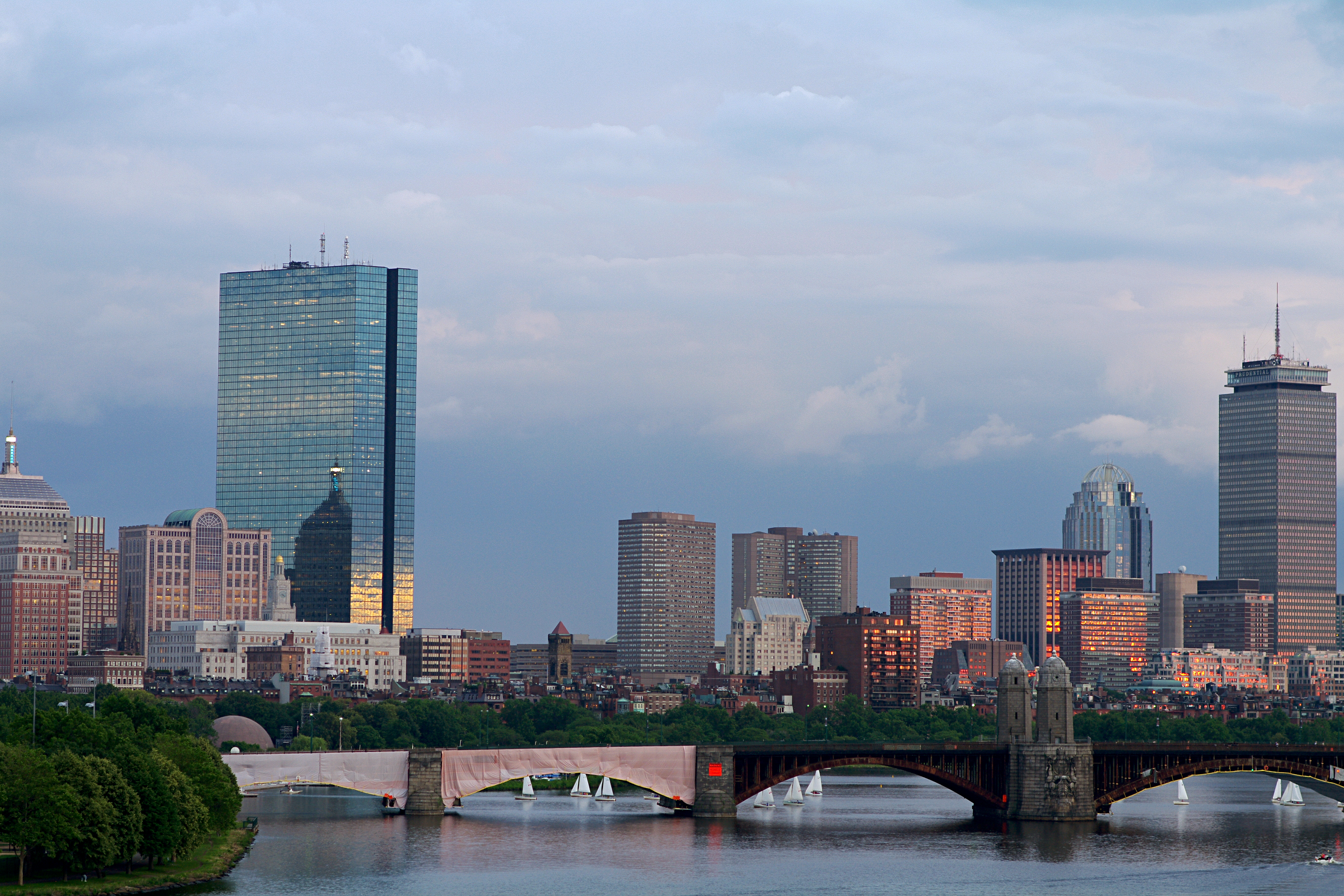
Emergency repairs under way, July 2011

The condition of the bridge was determined to be so bad that the state could not wait for development of a full restoration plan. A $17 million contract was signed with SPS New England Inc for interim repairs. Crews began work in August 2010 that involved improving sidewalks on the approaches to bring them up to ADA compliance. In March 2011, crews began structural inspections for Phase II and cleaning of the stone masonry piers. MassDOT announced in May 2011 that work would begin on stripping and cleaning rust from steel arch ribbons that had not been painted since 1953. Crews were to apply paint primer to the arch ribbons and evaluate them for future major rehabilitation. All work was expected to be completed by December 2011.

=== Major reconstruction project ===
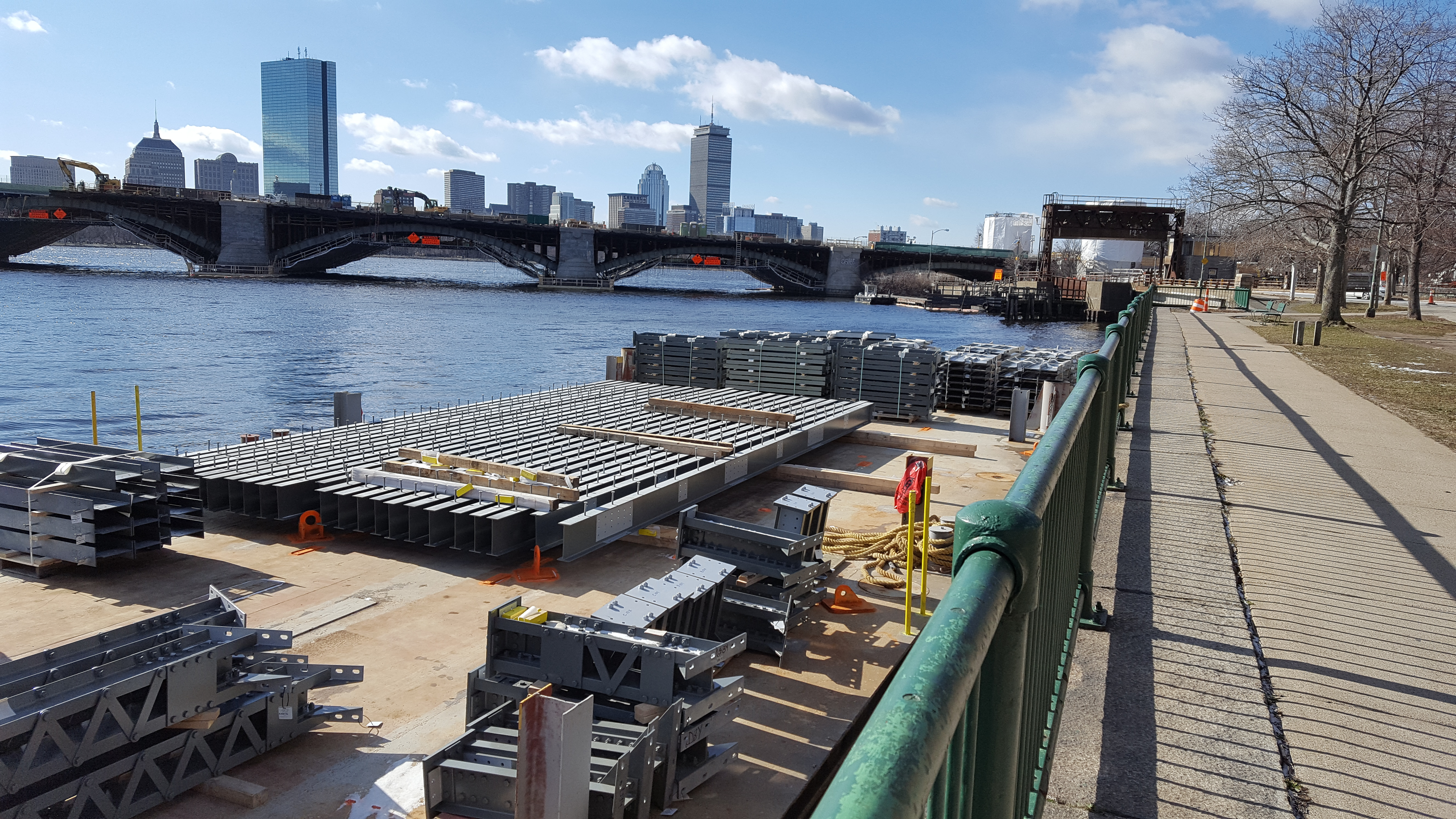
Structural elements on a barge in Cambridge, Massachusetts, waiting to be installed

A $255 million project started construction in the summer of 2013 to replace structural elements of the bridge, and restore its historic character. The project was expected to require at least 25 weekend shutdowns of MBTA Red Line subway service to accommodate construction, including multiple temporary relocations of the rapid transit tracks. Outbound road traffic (from Boston to Cambridge) was to be detoured from the bridge for all three years of expected construction. A single lane of inbound traffic was expected to be available for the duration of the project, potentially restricted to buses-only at certain hours. A computer animation movie released by MassDOT showed the complex six-stage rehabilitation process in great detail, including temporary installation of a "shoo-fly track" (bypass track) to allow the permanent railbed at the midline of the span to be rebuilt.

The design/build phase of the bridge was assigned to the joint venture team of contractors White-Skanska-Conslgli under supervision by MassDOT. Preliminary design engineering was performed by Jacobs Engineering. STV, Inc. was the final design engineer and engineer of record. The design provided for widened sidewalks and bike lanes, with two motor vehicle lanes inbound (towards Boston), but only a single lane outbound (towards Cambridge). Boston-based architect Miguel Rosales served as lead architect on the rehabilitation project.

The Longfellow Bridge is considered to be the most important historic bridge in the City of Boston due to its prominent location over the Charles River and outstanding visual and architectural quality. The primary aim of the rehabilitation project was to address the bridge's structural deficiencies, upgrade its capacity and bring it up to date with modern codes while also preserving its visual and historic architectural character. A significant portion of the restoration work lay with dismantling, cleaning, restoring, and re-erecting the 58-foot-tall towers that frame the river's navigation channel, which had settled over time.

The Longfellow Bridge Restoration and Rehabilitation project was scheduled for completion in 2016, but the completion date was extended to December 2018, due in part to historic restoration requiring obsolete construction techniques such as riveting. In August 2016, the outbound side of the bridge was completely closed to all traffic, including pedestrians and cyclists, in order to complete work sooner. This measure was undertaken to allow the bridge to be fully reopened by June 2018. After years of delays, the bridge was fully reopened on May 31, 2018, but portions of the project, such as replacing the old pedestrian footbridge over Storrow Drive with the Frances Appleton Bridge, were completed in fall 2018. According to Jonathan L. Gulliver, MassDOT Highway Administrator, the total cost of the rebuilding project was $306.6 million. After a settlement with its contractors, the state paid $305.5 million on a budgeted cost of $303.7 million, which had included cost overruns.

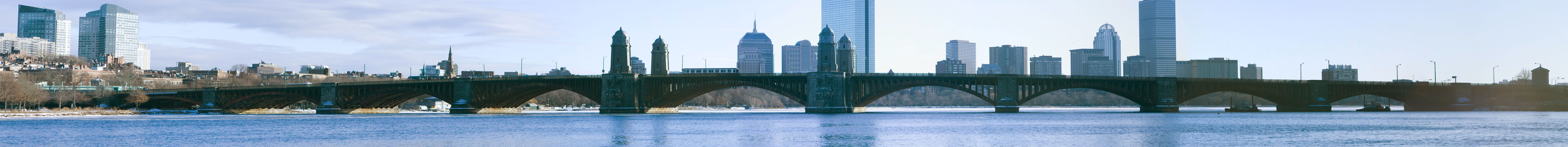
View of the Longfellow Bridge from East Cambridge in 2008

== See also ==
- List of bridges documented by the Historic American Engineering Record in Massachusetts
