= Frances Appleton Bridge =

Frances Appleton Pedestrian Bridge
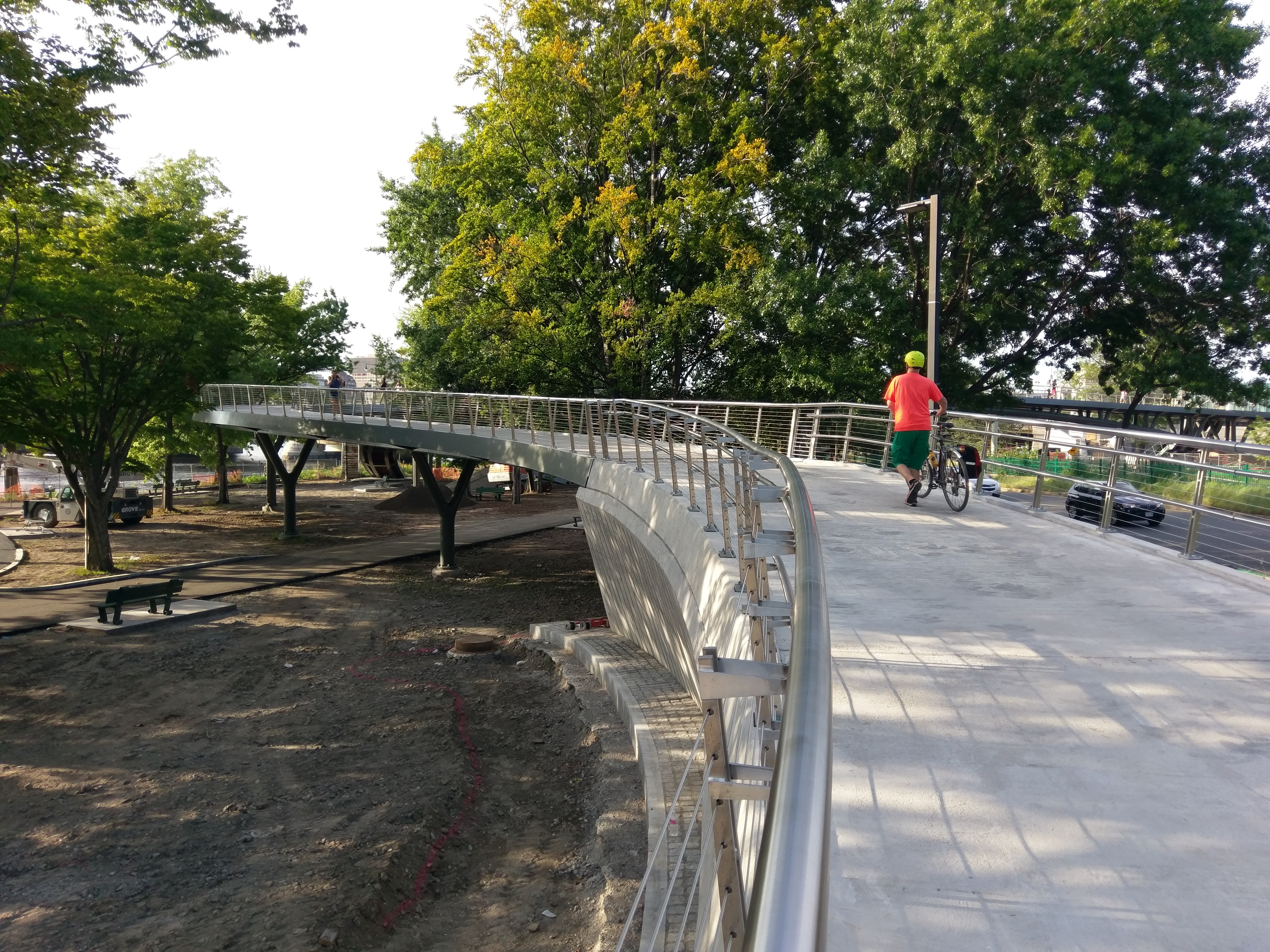
- Coordinates: 42.360629°N 71.072423°W
- Carries: Pedestrians
- Crosses: Storrow Drive
- Locale: Boston, Massachusetts

Characteristics
- Design: Deck steel arch
- Total length: 607 feet (185 m)
- Width: 14 feet (4.3 m)
- Height: 21 feet (6.4 m)
- Longest span: 222 feet (68 m)

History
- Construction start: 2016
- Construction end: 2018
- Opened: 31 August 2018

Location
- Interactive map of Frances Appleton Pedestrian Bridge

The Frances Appleton Pedestrian Bridge is a pedestrian bridge in Boston, Massachusetts that opened on August 31, 2018. The bridge, which crosses Storrow Drive, is named in recognition of the celebrated courtship and marriage of Frances “Fanny” Appleton and Henry Wadsworth Longfellow, after whom an adjacent larger bridge is named.

== Design and construction ==
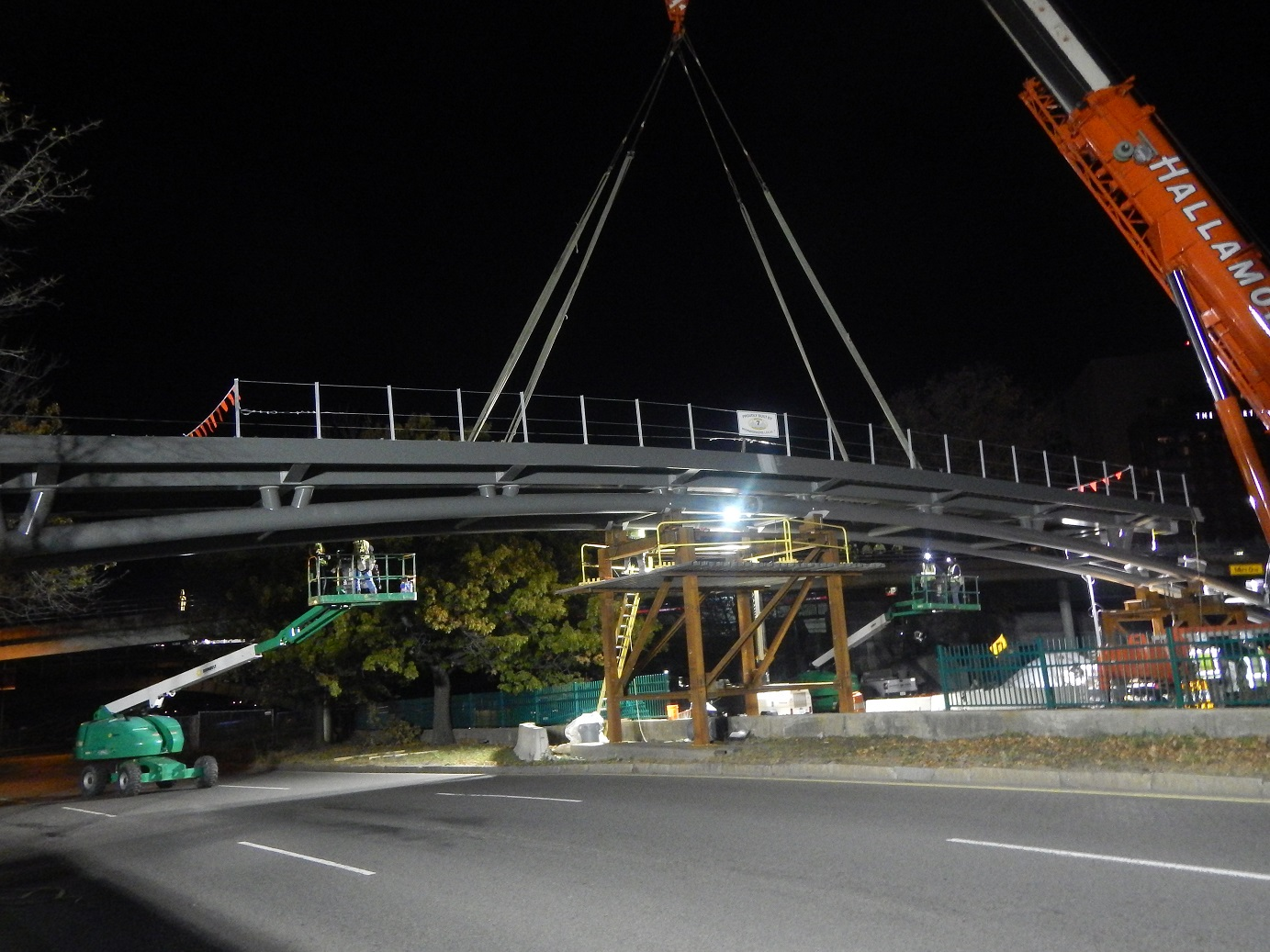
Installation of the deck on the main span of the Frances Appleton Bridge

The Frances Appleton Bridge was completed in 2018, at an estimated construction cost of $12.5 million. The bridge opened on August 31, 2018, and is owned by the Massachusetts Department of Conservation and Recreation.

The bridge consists of a contemporary tubular steel arch with a main span approximately 222 feet (68 m) long over Storrow Drive via a 14-foot (4.3 m) wide deck that accommodates both bicyclists and pedestrians. The bridge is 550 feet (170 m) in length and was designed to comply with Americans with Disabilities Act maximum slope requirements, and also to avoid large trees in the parkland while also maximizing views.

The sculptural curves and lightness of the bridge make it appear to float above the parkland and its Y-shaped vertical supports mimic tree branches. Aesthetic lighting complements the narrow-beam pin lights that illuminate the walking path, creating a safe and interesting destination at night. The bridge enhances its historic setting while providing greater access and visibility to all users.

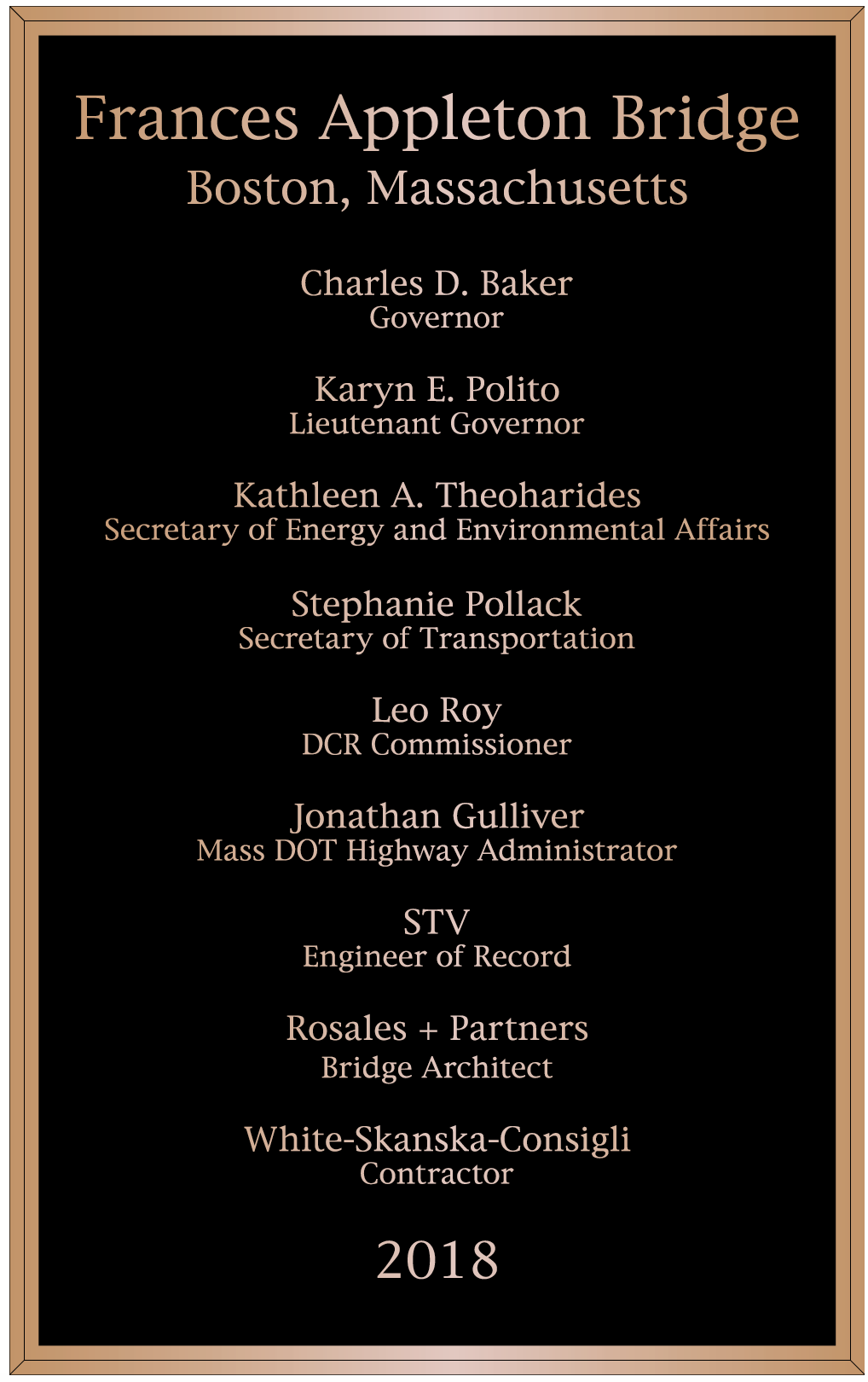
Frances Appleton Bridge Naming Plaque
