= Brick Presbyterian Church =

Brick Presbyterian Church may refer to:

- Brick Presbyterian Church (New York City)
- Old Brick Church (New York City), the former building of Brick Presbyterian Church (New York City)
- Brick Presbyterian Church (Perry, New York)
- Brick Presbyterian Church Complex (Rochester, New York)

== See also ==
- Brick Church (disambiguation)
- Old Brick Church (Iowa City, Iowa), once known as First Presbyterian or North Presbyterian
- Brick Chapel Church and Cemetery, Canton, New York, a historic Presbyterian church and cemetery
- Cove Presbyterian Church, Wytheville, Virginia, also known as Cove Brick Church
- Crockett's Cove Presbyterian Church
- Old Brick Church (Fairfield County, South Carolina), also known as Ebenezer Associate Reformed Presbyterian Church
- Salem Black River Presbyterian Church, Sumter, South Carolina, also known as Brick Church
