= Old Brick Church =

Old Brick Church may refer to:

- Old Brick Church (Iowa City, Iowa)
- Old Brick Church (Fairfield County, South Carolina)
- Old Brick Church (New York City)
- Old Brick Church (Athens, Vermont)
- Old Brick Church (Jeffersonville, Vermont)
- Old Brick Church (Bacon's Castle, Virginia)

== See also ==
- Brick Church (disambiguation)
