= South Carolina Highway 269 =

State highway in South Carolina, United States

South Carolina Highway 269

Route information
- Maintained by SCDOT
- Length: 11.950 mi (19.232 km)

Major junctions
- South end: SC 215 near Blythewood
- North end: US 321 near Winnsboro Mills

Location
- Country: United States
- State: South Carolina
- Counties: Richland, Fairfield

Highway system
- South Carolina State Highway System; Interstate; US; State; Scenic
| ← SC 268 | → SC 274 |

South Carolina Highway 269 (SC 269) is a 11.950-mile (19.232 km) state highway in the U.S. state of South Carolina. The highway travels through rural areas of Richland and Fairfield counties.

== Route description ==
SC 269 begins at an intersection with SC 215 (Monticello Road) near Blythewood, Richland County. It travels to the north and curves to the north-northwest and enters Fairfield County. It curves to the north-northeast and the northeast and passes the Fairfield County Airport. A short distance later, it meets its northern terminus, an intersection with U.S. Route 321 (US 321) at a point south of Winnsboro Mills.

== Major intersections ==
| County | Location | mi | km | Destinations | Notes |
|---|---|---|---|---|---|
| Richland | | 0.000 | 0.000 | SC 215 (Monticello Road) – Jenkinsville, Union, Spartanburg | Southern terminus |
| Fairfield | | 11.950 | 19.232 | US 321 – columbia, Winnsboro, Chester | Northern terminus |
1.000 mi = 1.609 km; 1.000 km = 0.621 mi
