= Dr. John Glenn House =

Historic house in South Carolina, United States

- U.S. National Register of Historic Places
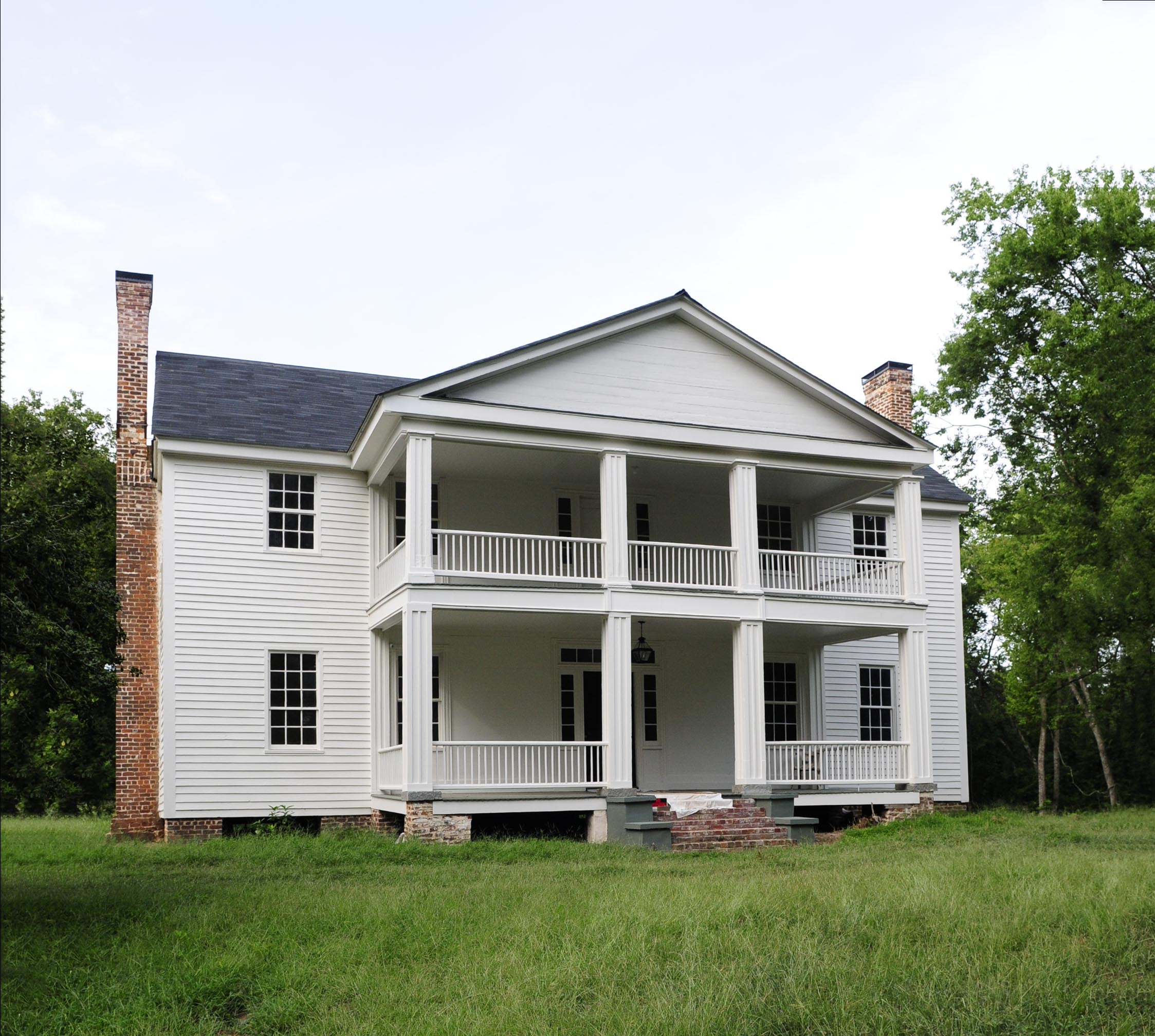
- Dr. John Glenn House, August 2012

- Location within South Carolina Location within the United States
- Location: South Carolina Highway 215, near Jenkinsville, South Carolina
- Coordinates: 34°14′51″N 81°15′6″W
- Area: 4.6 acres (1.9 ha)
- Built: c. 1845
- MPS: Fairfield County MRA
- NRHP reference No.: 84000572
- Added to NRHP: December 6, 1984

Dr. John Glenn House is a historic home located near Jenkinsville, Fairfield County, South Carolina. It was built about 1845, and is a two-story, five-bay, weatherboarded frame, end-gabled Greek Revival style residence. It has a double-pile and central-hall plan with a rear shed room. The front façade features a two-tiered porch in the three central bays with a pedimented gable end.

It was added to the National Register of Historic Places in 1984.
