= Hunter House (Ridgeway, South Carolina) =

Historic house in South Carolina, United States

- U.S. National Register of Historic Places
- Location within South Carolina Location within the United States
- Location: Northeast of Ridgeway, near Ridgeway, South Carolina
- Coordinates: 34°19′27″N 80°56′5″W
- Area: 3.4 acres (1.4 ha)
- Built: c. 1820
- Architectural style: Federal
- MPS: Fairfield County MRA
- NRHP reference No.: 84000588
- Added to NRHP: December 6, 1984

Hunter House is a historic home located near Ridgeway, Fairfield County, South Carolina. It was built about 1820, and is a 1 1/2-story, L-shaped Federal style weatherboarded building on a raised brick basement. It has a gable roof and exterior end chimneys. The five-bay façade features a pedimented porch sheltering the three central bays.

It was added to the National Register of Historic Places in 1984.
