= High Point (Jenkinsville, South Carolina) =

Historic house in South Carolina, United States

- U.S. National Register of Historic Places
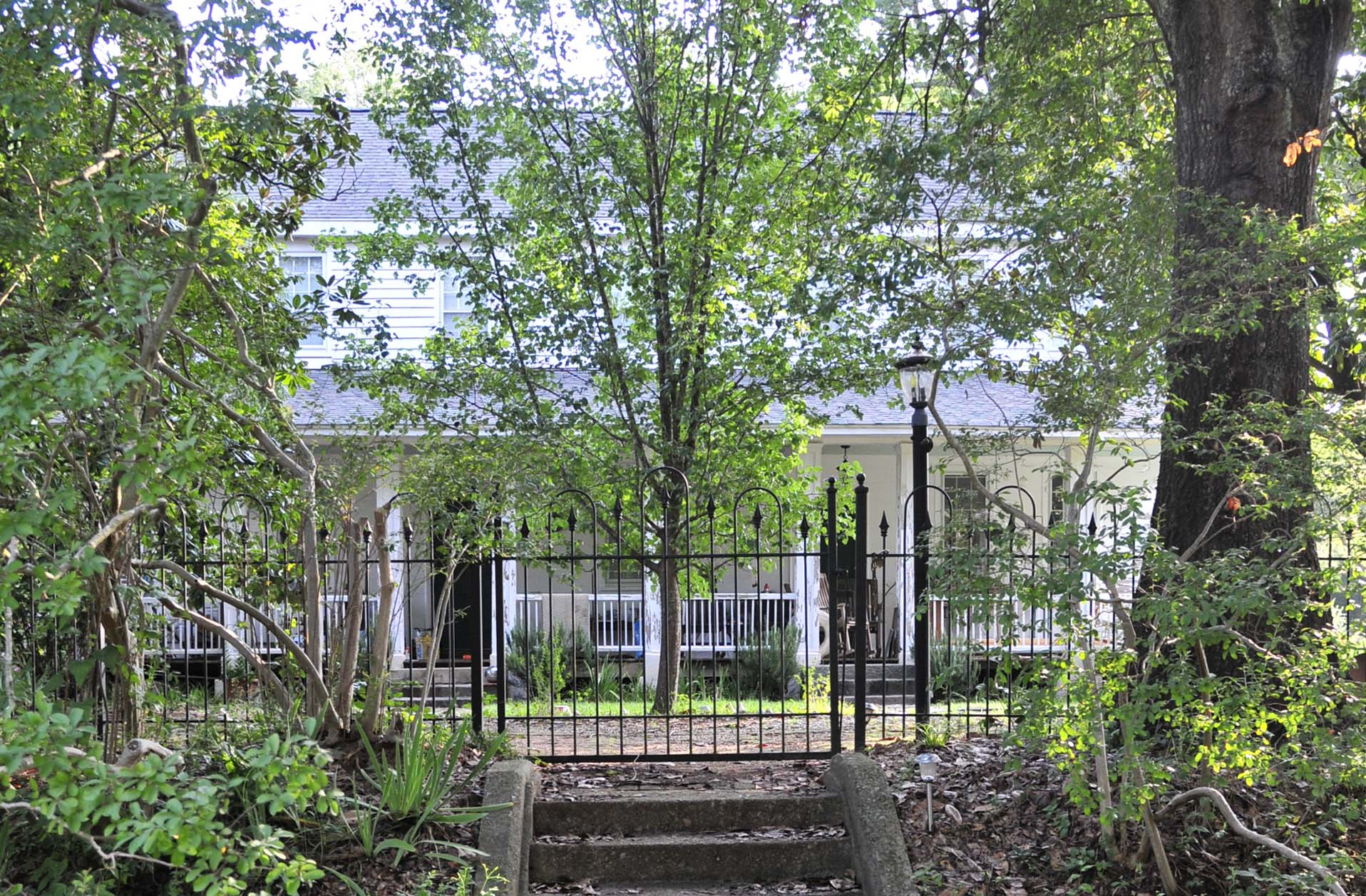
- High Point, July 2012

- Location within South Carolina Location within the United States
- Location: South Carolina Highway 215, near Jenkinsville, South Carolina
- Coordinates: 34°14′47″N 81°14′56″W
- Area: c. 5.5 acres (2.2 ha)
- Built: c. 1800, c. 1870
- MPS: Fairfield County MRA
- NRHP reference No.: 84000576
- Added to NRHP: December 6, 1984

High Point is a historic home located near Jenkinsville, Fairfield County, South Carolina. The original section, built around 1800, is a two-story, five-bay frame farmhouse with later expansions. A two-story rear ell was added around 1870. The home features a one-story, shed-roofed porch across the front facade, supported by square posts. Additionally, the property includes a contributing family cemetery, a frame smoke house, and a frame barn.

It was added to the National Register of Historic Places in 1984.
