= Rion, South Carolina =

- Unincorporated community
- Location within South Carolina Location within the United States
- Coordinates: 34°18′26″N 81°07′30″W
- Country: United States
- State: South Carolina
- County: Fairfield
- Elevation: 538 ft (164 m)
- Time zone: UTC-5 (Eastern (EST))
  - Summer (DST): UTC-4 (EDT)
- ZIP code: 29132
- Area codes: 803, 839
- GNIS feature ID: 1231731

Rion is an unincorporated community in Fairfield County, South Carolina, United States. The community is located near South Carolina Highway 269 5.5 miles (8.9 km) south-southwest of Winnsboro. Rion has a post office with ZIP code 29132, which opened on July 15, 1884.
