= Monroe Wilson House =

Historic house in South Carolina, United States

- U.S. National Register of Historic Places
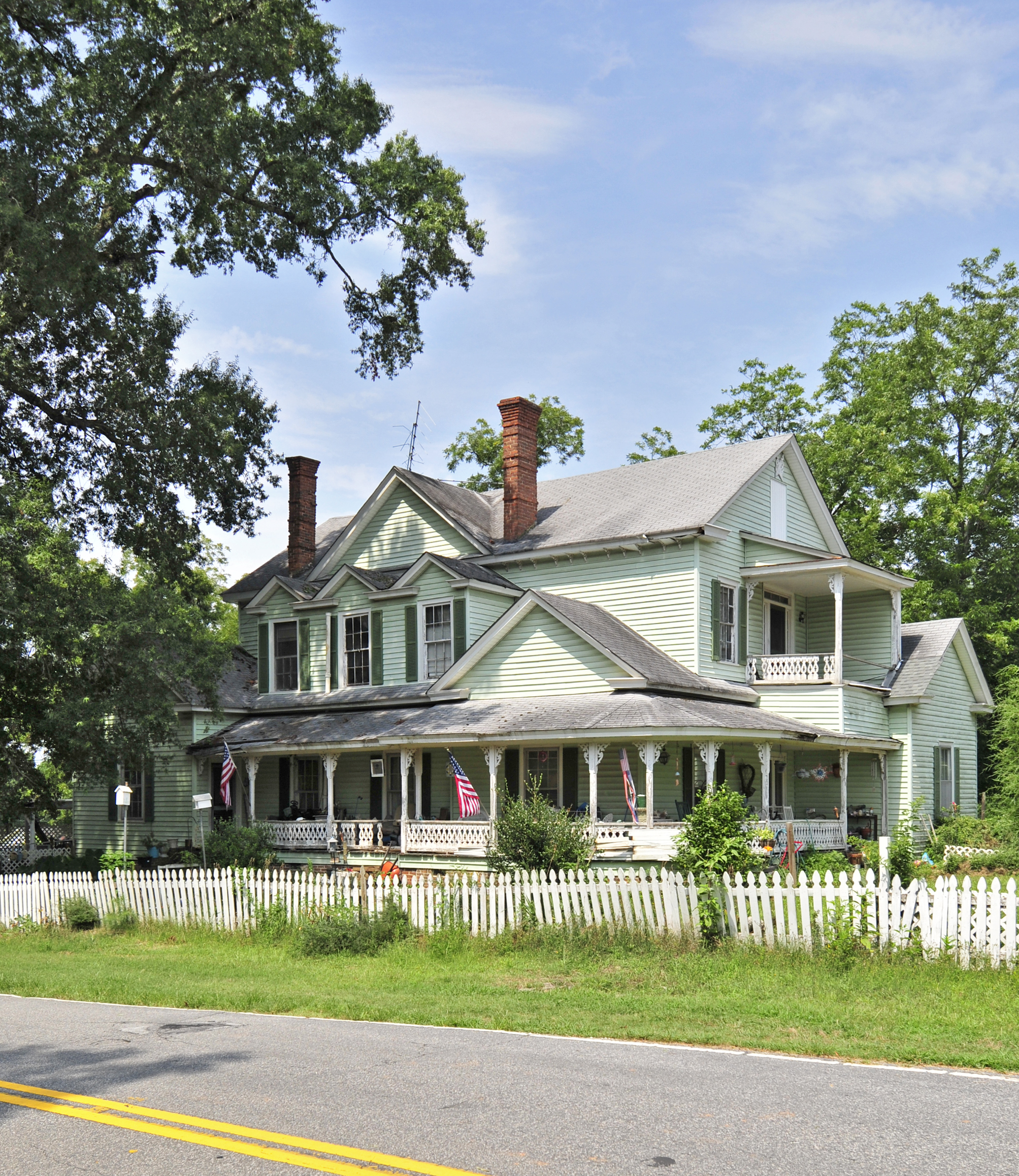
- Monroe Wilson House, July 2012

- Location within South Carolina Location within the United States
- Location: Railroad Ave. and SR S20-20, Ridgeway, South Carolina
- Coordinates: 34°18′30″N 80°57′54″W
- Area: 0.7 acres (0.28 ha)
- Built: 1890
- Architectural style: Late Victorian, Vernacular Victorian
- MPS: Ridgeway MRA
- NRHP reference No.: 80004467
- Added to NRHP: November 25, 1980

Monroe Wilson House is a historic home located at Ridgeway, Fairfield County, South Carolina. It was built about 1890, and is a two-story, rectangular, frame Victorian vernacular house. It features a porch that runs along the façade and southeast elevation with square posts and elaborate brackets. There is a small second story porch over the front entrance.

It was added to the National Register of Historic Places in 1980.
