= Mayfair (Jenkinsville, South Carolina) =

Historic house in South Carolina, United States

- U.S. National Register of Historic Places
- Location within South Carolina Location within the United States
- Location: Off SC 215, near Jenkinsville, South Carolina
- Coordinates: 34°15′42″N 81°17′34″W
- Area: 10 acres (4.0 ha)
- Built: 1824
- MPS: Fairfield County MRA
- NRHP reference No.: 85000246
- Added to NRHP: February 6, 1985

Mayfair is a historic home located near Jenkinsville, Fairfield County, South Carolina. It was built about 1824, and is a two-story, weatherboarded Federal style frame residence with a hipped roof. The front façade features a central, two-story, polygonal pedimented portico. According to local tradition, Mayfair was the home of Burrell B. Cook, a moderately wealthy planter, who served in the Twenty-eighth General Assembly of South Carolina from 1828 to 1829.

It was added to the National Register of Historic Places in 1985.
