= Ridgeway Historic District =

Historic district in South Carolina, United States

- U.S. National Register of Historic Places
- U.S. Historic district
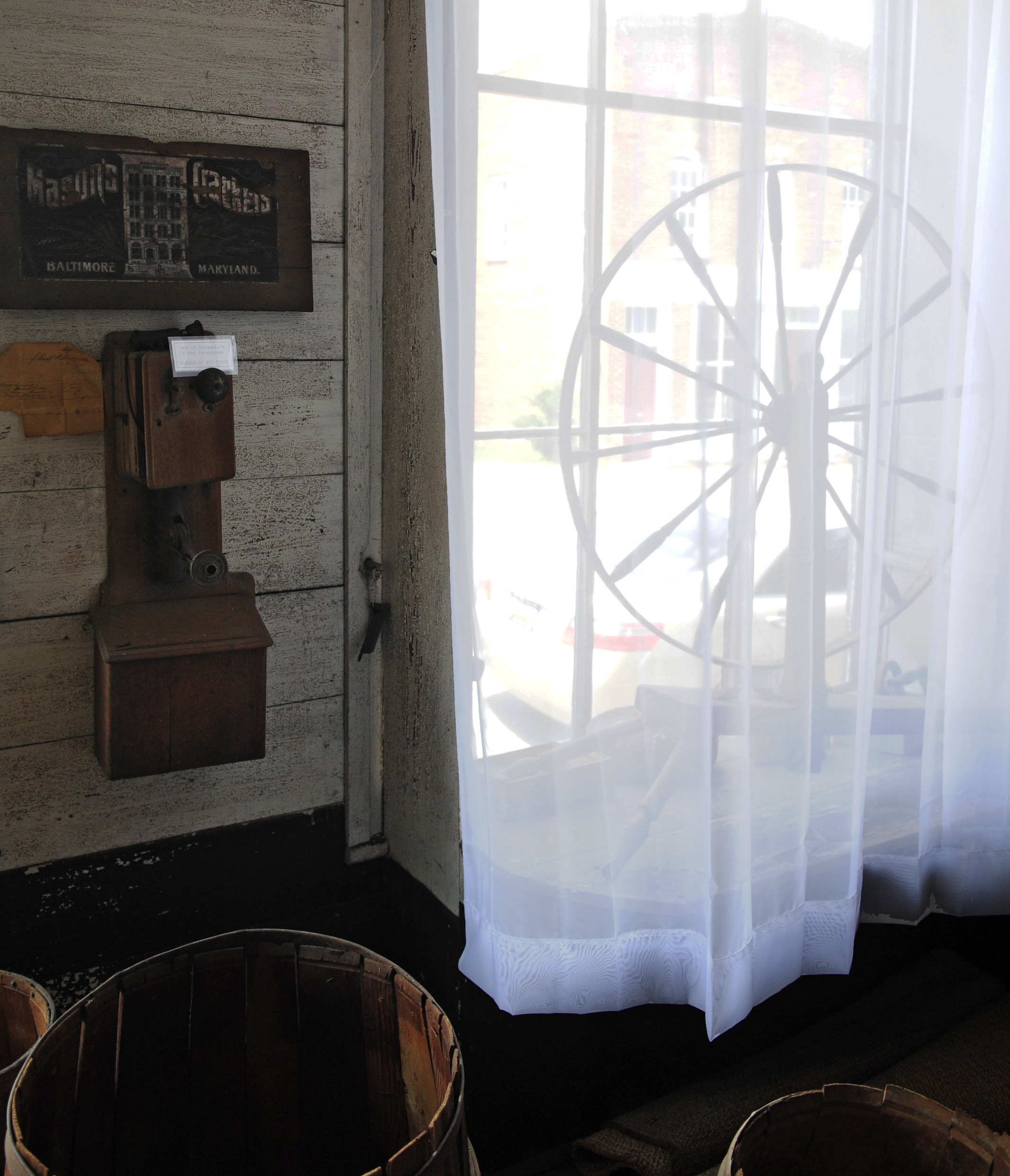
- Ridgeway Country Store, July 2012

- Location within South Carolina Location within the United States
- Location: US 21 and SC 34, Ridgeway, South Carolina
- Coordinates: 34°18′26″N 80°57′39″W
- Area: 24.6 acres (10.0 ha)
- Built: c. 1910
- Architect: Multiple
- Architectural style: Colonial Revival, Classical Revival, Queen Anne
- MPS: Ridgeway MRA
- NRHP reference No.: 80004466
- Added to NRHP: November 25, 1980

Ridgeway Historic District is a national historic district located at Ridgeway, Fairfield County, South Carolina. The district encompasses 31 contributing buildings in the town of Ridgeway. A majority of the buildings in the district were built between 1890 and 1915, the heyday of cotton production in the area. The district includes a commercial block with a predominance of simply ornamented two-story brick stores and a residential block with primarily asymmetrical, frame, weatherboarded houses lining the tree shaded streets. Styles include Queen Anne, Neo-Classical, Victorian, and Bungalow. Notable buildings include the J. Spann Edmunds House, Augustus Talley Moore House, Thomas Co. Store, Ruff Furniture Store, Dobson's Drug Store, Ridgeway Town Hall, Ruff's Gin Shop, James Team's Drugstore, and the Charlotte and South Carolina Railroad House.

It was listed on the National Register of Historic Places in 1980.
