= Valencia (Ridgeway, South Carolina) =

Historic house in South Carolina, United States

- U.S. National Register of Historic Places
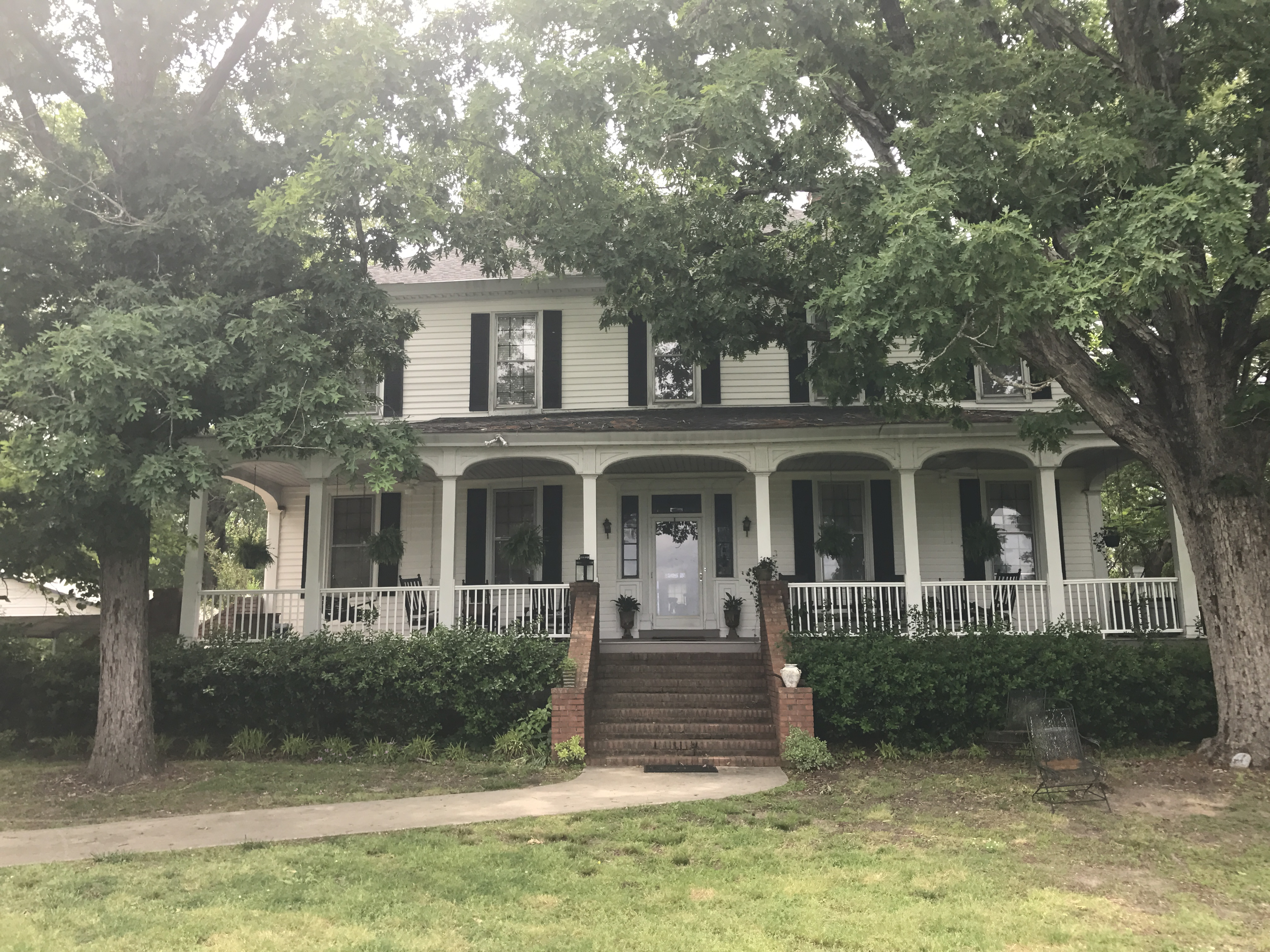

- Location within South Carolina Location within the United States
- Location: Northwest of Ridgeway on County Road 106, near Ridgeway, South Carolina
- Coordinates: 34°19′40″N 80°59′0″W
- Area: 2 acres (0.81 ha)
- Built: 1834
- NRHP reference No.: 71000779
- Added to NRHP: May 6, 1971

Valencia is a historic plantation house located near Ridgeway, Fairfield County, South Carolina. It was built in 1834, and is a large two-story frame house on a brick pier foundation. The house features a hipped roof, two mammoth chimneys, and a broad one-story piazza with unique elliptical arches. Valencia was built by Edward Gendron Palmer, a leader in civic, political, and religious life of Ridgeway and Fairfield County.

It was added to the National Register of Historic Places in 1971.
