= James Kincaid =

James Kincaid may refer to:

- James R. Kincaid, American academic active since 1972
- James Kincaid, American cotton merchant who lived in Kincaid-Anderson House, South Carolina
- James Kincaid, first settler of Kincaid, West Virginia in 1807
- James Galsepy Kincaid, allegedly gave name to Deep Water, West Virginia in 1871
- James Kincaid, character in 1933 American western musical Riders of Destiny
- James Kincaid, main character in 1942 American western Silver Queen
- James Harvey Kincaid Stewart Lindsay (1915–2007), president of Bengal Chamber of Commerce and Industry
- James Kincaid, American pilot who crashed in 1997 during an air show at San Marcos, Texas, U.S.
- Jim Kincaid (1934–2011), American journalist
- Jim Kincaid (gridiron football) (1930–2014), American football player
