= Blink Bonnie =

Blink Bonnie may refer to:

- Blink Bonnie (Schodack, New York), listed on the National Register of Historic Places in Rensselaer County, New York
- Blink Bonnie (Ridgeway, South Carolina), listed on the National Register of Historic Places in Fairfield County, South Carolina
