= Vaughn's Stage Coach Stop =

- U.S. National Register of Historic Places
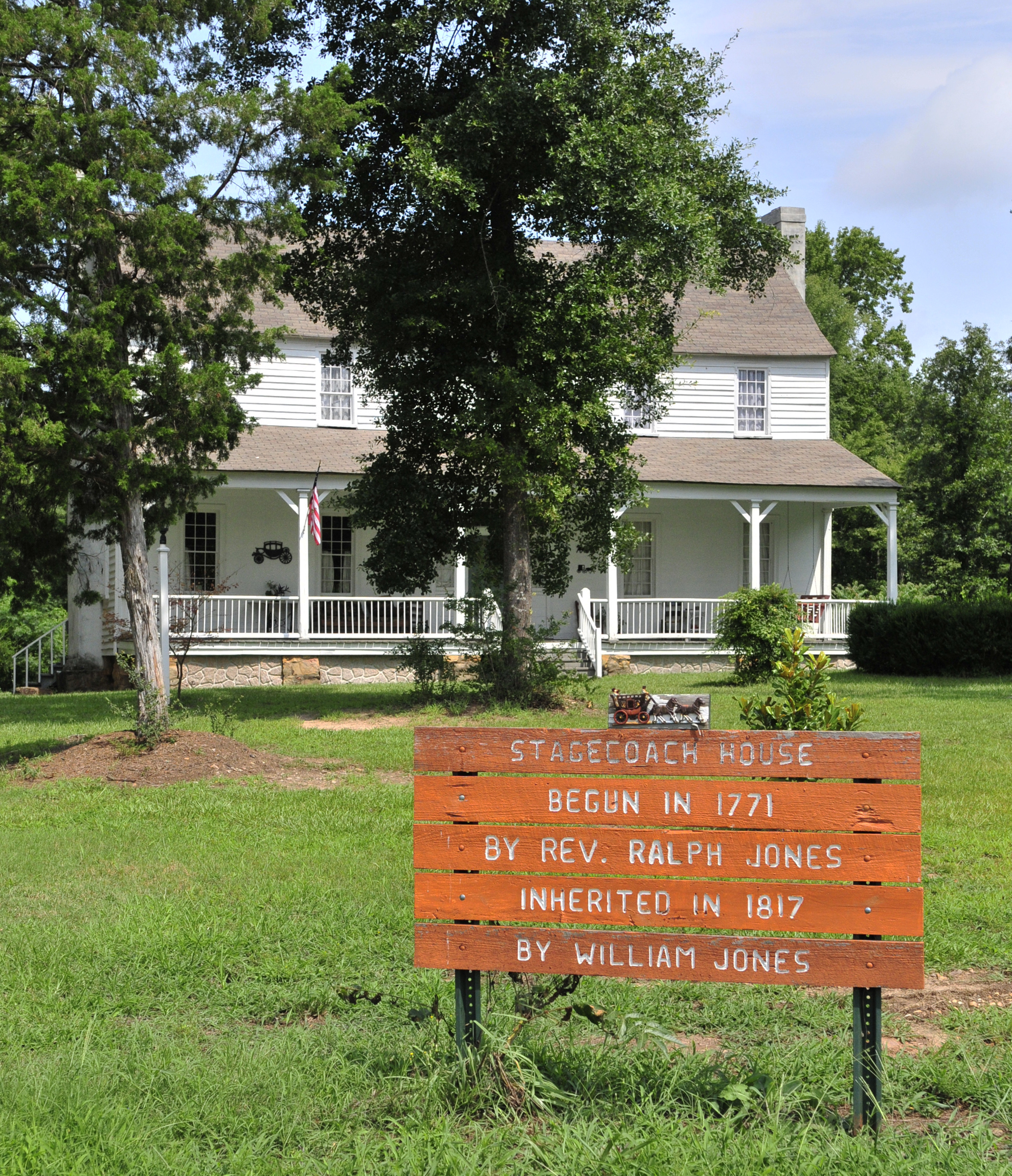
- Vaughn's Stage Coach Stop, July 2012

- Location within South Carolina Location within the United States
- Location: South Carolina Highway 34, near Ridgeway, South Carolina
- Coordinates: 34°18′36″N 81°2′0″W
- Area: less than one acre
- Built: c. 1820
- MPS: Fairfield County MRA
- NRHP reference No.: 84000591
- Added to NRHP: December 6, 1984

Vaughn's Stage Coach Stop is a historic stagecoach stop located near Ridgeway, Fairfield County, South Carolina. It was built about 1820, and is a two-story, weatherboarded frame, gable-roofed residence with a double-pile and central hall floor plan. The building sits on a foundation of stone piers, has end chimneys, rear shed rooms, and a left rear addition. The façade features a one-story, shed-roofed porch with a plain wooden balustrade supported by six slender wooden posts.

It was added to the National Register of Historic Places in 1984.
