= Mount Hope (Ridgeway, South Carolina) =

Historic house in South Carolina, United States

- U.S. National Register of Historic Places
- Location within South Carolina Location within the United States
- Location: South Carolina Highway 34, near Ridgeway, South Carolina
- Coordinates: 34°17′58″N 80°59′18″W
- Area: 3 acres (1.2 ha)
- Built: c. 1836
- MPS: Fairfield County MRA
- NRHP reference No.: 84000589
- Added to NRHP: December 6, 1984

Mount Hope is a historic home located near Ridgeway, Fairfield County, South Carolina. It was built about 1836, and is a 1 1/2-story, vernacular weatherboarded building on a raised brick basement. It has a gable roof and three pedimented dormers. Also on the property are a frame smoke house (c. 1850) and a tenant house (c. 1875). It was the home of Dr. John Peyre Thomas, a prominent physician and amateur scientist.

It was added to the National Register of Historic Places in 1984.
