= Ruff's Chapel =

- U.S. National Register of Historic Places
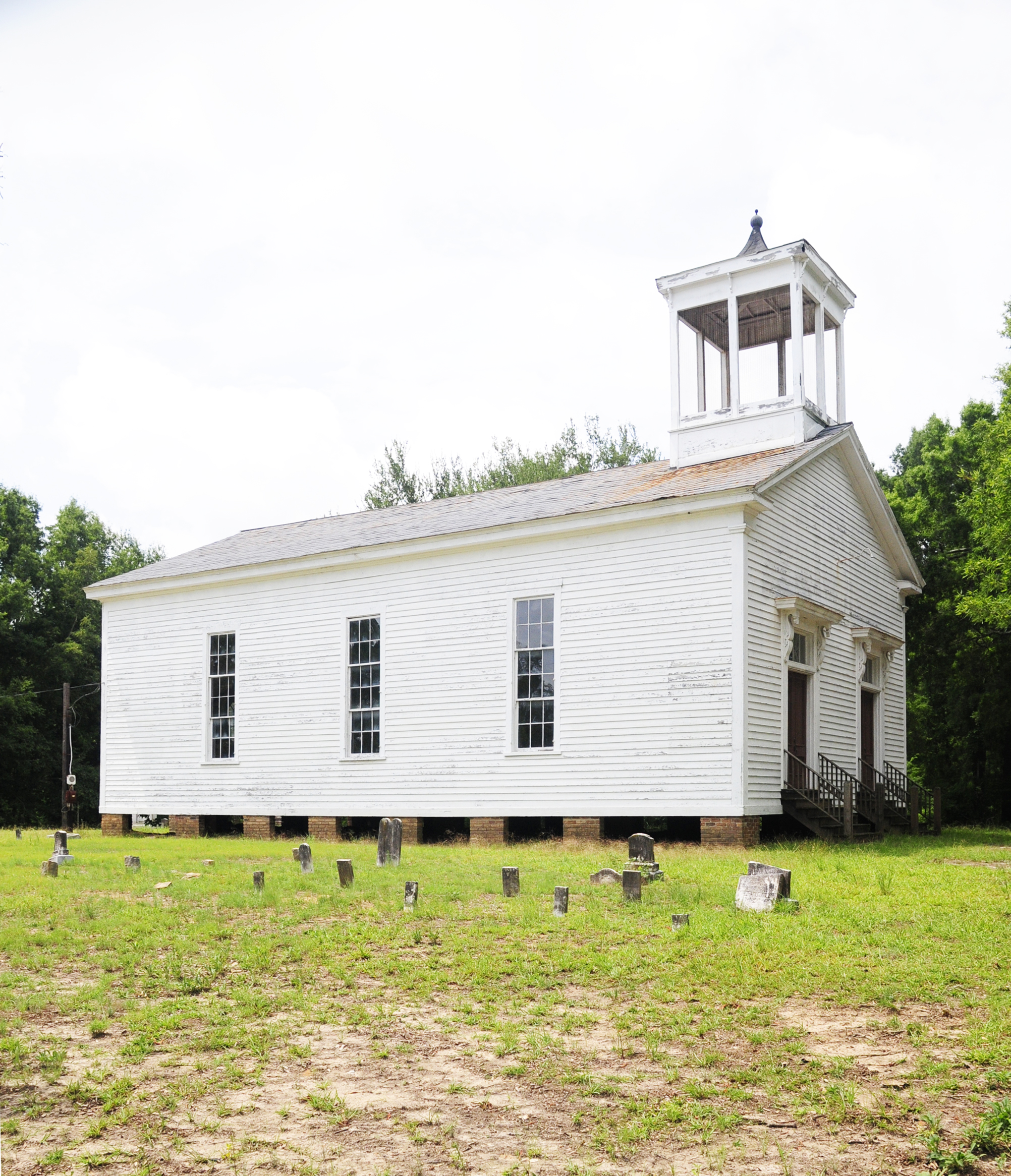

- Location within South Carolina Location within the United States
- Location: U.S. 21 and SC 34, Ridgeway, South Carolina
- Coordinates: 34°18′15″N 80°57′28″W
- Area: 1.3 acres (0.53 ha)
- Built: 1870
- MPS: Ridgeway MRA
- NRHP reference No.: 80004400
- Added to NRHP: November 25, 1980

Ruff's Chapel is a historic Methodist chapel at U.S. 21 and SC 34 in Ridgeway, Fairfield County, South Carolina. It was built about 1870, and is a single-story, rectangular frame building, sheathed in weatherboard, with a front gabled roof. It has a square open belfry with a metal covered bellcast hip roof and a ball finial.

It was added to the National Register of Historic Places in 1980.
