= Little River Baptist Church =

Historic church in South Carolina, United States

- U.S. National Register of Historic Places
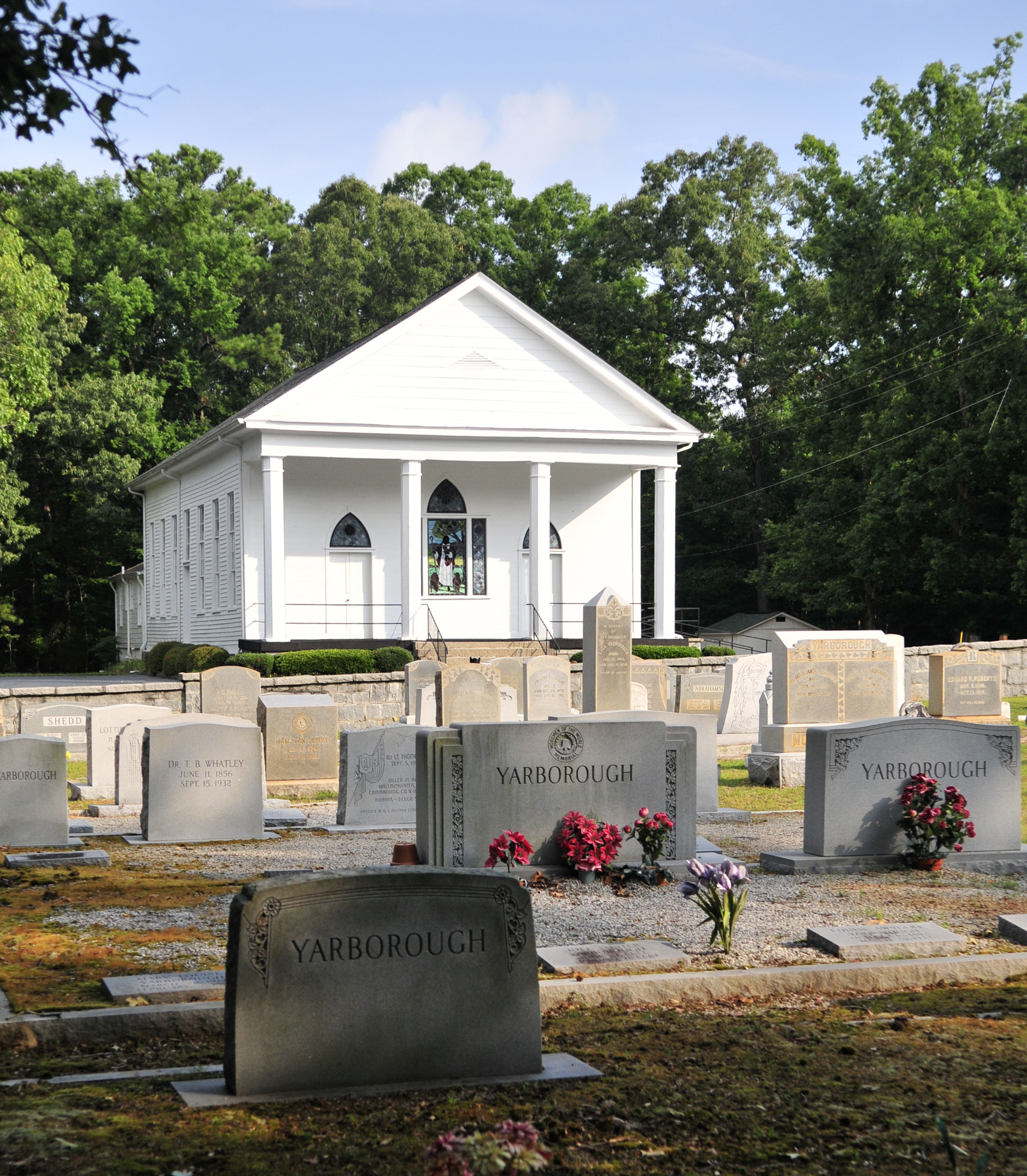

- Location within South Carolina Location within the United States
- Location: 3.8 miles north of Jenkinsville on South Carolina Highway 213, near Jenkinsville, South Carolina
- Coordinates: 34°18′38″N 81°16′31″W
- Area: 3 acres (1.2 ha)
- Built: 1845
- Architectural style: Greek Revival
- NRHP reference No.: 72001208
- Added to NRHP: April 13, 1972

Little River Baptist Church is a historic Southern Baptist church located near Jenkinsville, Fairfield County, South Carolina. USA. It was built about 1845, and is a one-story, frame meeting house plan church. The church is a rectangular clapboard structure of Greek Revival design with Gothic Revival details in the front facade. The front gabled roof is supported by four octagonal columns on a raised platform. In the early 1950s, a wing was added to provide Sunday School rooms and kitchen facilities.

It was added to the National Register of Historic Places in 1972.
