= Brick Church =

Brick Church may refer to:

- Brick Church (NJT station), a New Jersey Transit station in East Orange along the Morris and Essex Line
- Brick Church Complex (New Hempstead, New York), historic Dutch Reformed church
- Brick Presbyterian Church (Perry, New York)
- Brick Presbyterian Church Complex (Rochester, New York)
- Brick Presbyterian Church (New York City)

== See also ==
- Brick Church Corners, also known as Ontario Heritage Square, a national historic district located at Ontario, New York
- Red Brick Church (Sodus Center, New York), historic Baptist church
- Little Brick Church (Cedar Grove, West Virginia), also known as Virginia's Church, built 1853
- Old Brick Church (disambiguation)
- Brick Presbyterian Church (disambiguation)
