= Winnsboro =

Winnsboro may refer to a place in the United States:

- Winnsboro, Louisiana, a city in Franklin Parish
- Winnsboro, South Carolina, a town in Fairfield County
- Winnsboro Mills, South Carolina, a census-designated place in Fairfield County
- Winnsboro, Texas, a city in Franklin and Wood counties
