= Lake Wateree State Park =

State park in Ridgeway, South Carolina

- Interactive map of Lake Wateree State Park
- Nearest city: Ridgeway, South Carolina
- Coordinates: 34°26′11″N 80°51′51″W
- Area: 238 acres (1 km^{2})
- Created: 1984
- Camp sites: Paved tent and RV sites
- Hiking trails: 2 mile Desportes Island Nature Trail
- Website: Lake Wateree State Park

Lake Wateree State Park is a state park located in Winnsboro, South Carolina. The state park is located on Desportes Island on Lake Wateree, 17 miles from Winnsboro, SC and 14 miles from Ridgeway, SC. The 238-acre (0.96 km^{2}) site was acquired by the state in 1984 and offers 100 camping sites, picnic pads, an on-site tackle shop with boat refueling, and a 2-mile-long nature trail.

The park offers the free Tackle Loaner Program, coordinated by SCDNR, and kayak rentals. Both of these can be done at the park's tackle shop. Also available are a playground, a swing set, disc golf goals, a soccer field, five picnic pads (four of which are reservable, two ADA-compliant), and three lake-front swings.

There are many different species of wildlife you may encounter on your visit. The most common are eastern gray squirrel, whitetail deer, bald eagle, osprey, and various freshwater fish (Blue catfish, largemouth bass, striped bass, and black crappie are the most common catch).

The park's 100 campsites are divided between their two campgrounds- Riverside and Taylor Creek.

Riverside, the original campground built in 1984 with the rest of the park, offers 72 sites (1-72) with 14 of them on the waterfront. This campground offers 20-amp and 30-amp electrical service, water hookup, along with a dump station outside of the campground for your black and grey waste. There are two restroom facilities located in the interior of the campground loop.

Taylor Creek, the newest of the two campgrounds, was opened in 2020. It boasts the remaining 28 sites (73-100), and offers 20-amp, 30-amp, and 50-amp electrical service, water supply, and sewer connections. There is one restroom facility located in the campground.

The park hosts a few programs throughout the year, from guided hikes to educational programs. The two biggest programs are the annual Creepy Campout, typically held the last Saturday in October in celebration of Halloween, and the annual Easter event, held the Saturday before Easter.

The park was formerly known as Lake Wateree State Recreation Area.
