= St. Stephen's Episcopal Church (Ridgeway, South Carolina) =

Historic church in South Carolina, United States

- U.S. National Register of Historic Places
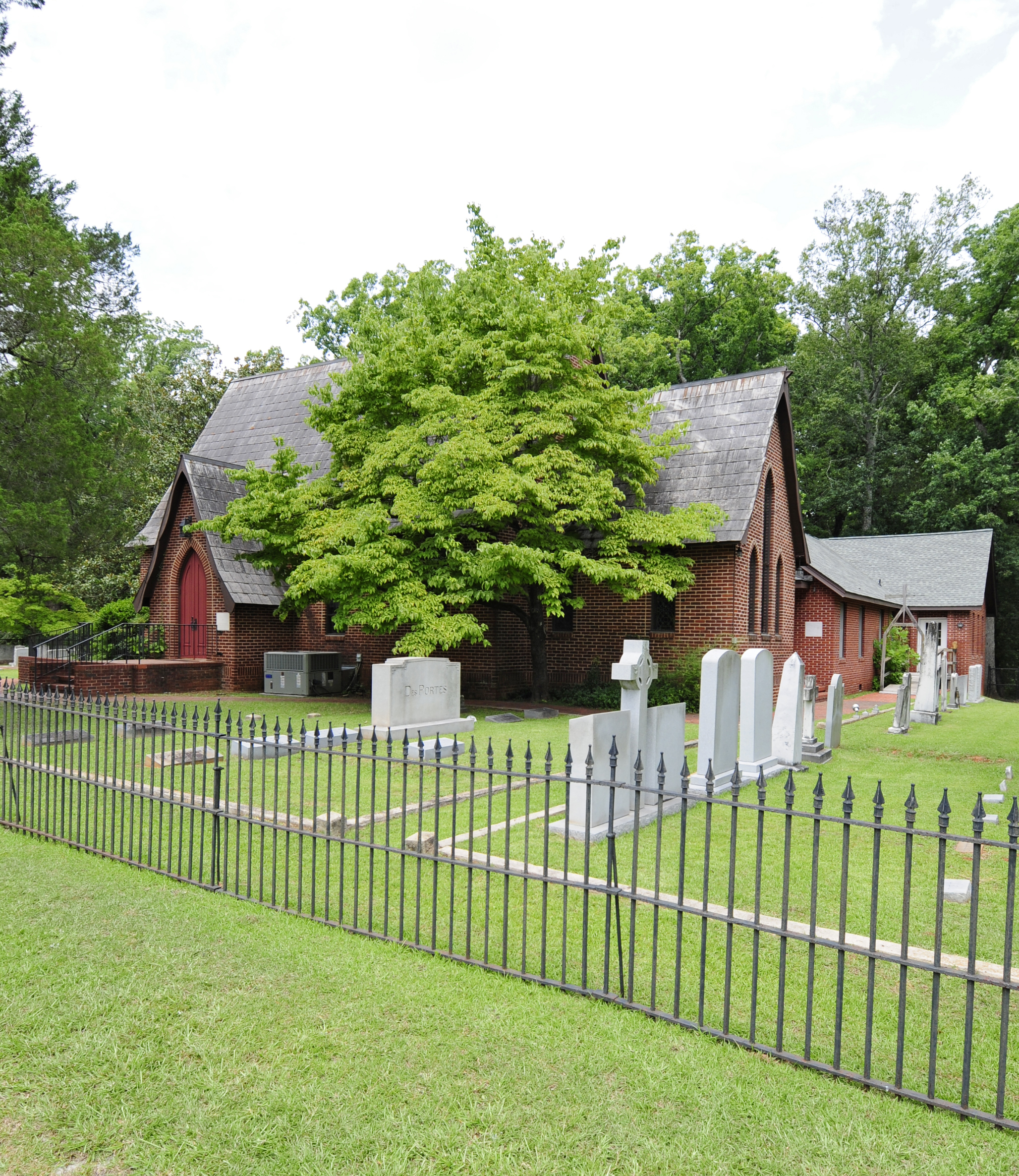

- Location within South Carolina Location within the United States
- Location: Northeast of Ridgeway on County Road 106, near Ridgeway, South Carolina
- Coordinates: 34°18′42″N 80°57′23″W
- Built: 1854, 1920 (brick veneer exterior added)
- Architect: The Rev. John Dewitt McCollough
- Architectural style: 1854 Carpenter Gothic; 1920 Gothic Revival
- NRHP reference No.: 71000778
- Added to NRHP: May 06, 1971

St. Stephen's Episcopal Church is an historic Episcopal church building located northeast of Ridgeway, South Carolina, on County Road 106. Built of wood in 1854 in the Carpenter Gothic style, it was designed by the Rev. John Dewitt McCollough, who later became its rector. The exterior was painted a maroon color. In 1920, its exterior wood was covered by brick veneer, so that it appears today as a brick Gothic Revival style building on the outside while the interior retains its Carpenter Gothic features. A wing was added in the 1940s to create space for a parish hall and Sunday school.

On May 6, 1971, it was added to the National Register of Historic Places.

== History of parish ==
St. Stephen's was founded in 1839 as a chapel of ease for St. John's Parish, Fairfield, and remained such until 1889 when it became a separate parish. Among its early rectors was the Rev. William Porcher DuBose, who served from 1865 to 1868.
