= Century House (Ridgeway, South Carolina) =

Historic house in South Carolina, United States

- U.S. National Register of Historic Places
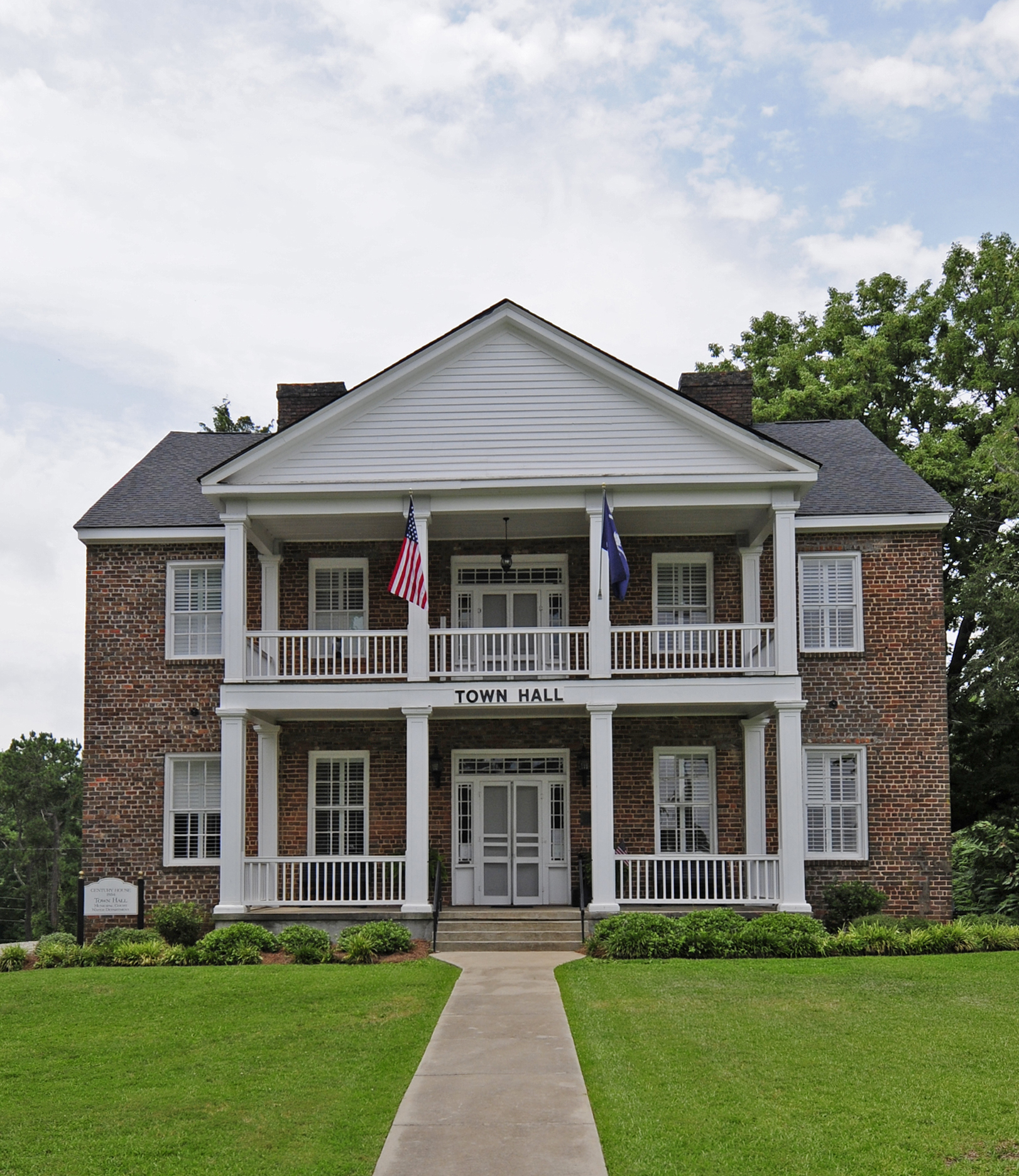
- Century House, July 2012

- Location within South Carolina Location within the United States
- Location: SC 34, Ridgeway, South Carolina
- Coordinates: 34°18′13″N 80°57′30″W
- Area: 1.9 acres (0.77 ha)
- Built: c. 1853
- Architectural style: Greek Revival
- NRHP reference No.: 71000777
- Added to NRHP: August 19, 1971

Century House, also known as Brick House and Beauregard's Headquarters, is a historic plantation house near Ridgeway, Fairfield County, South Carolina. It was built about 1853, and is a large, two-story brick house in the Greek Revival style. It features double-tiered, balustraded piazzas. During the American Civil War, Century House entertained and sheltered many refugees from Low Country South Carolina and Georgia and also served as the headquarters for the Confederate general P. G. T. Beauregard and his staff when Columbia was evacuated upon the approach of US general William Tecumseh Sherman’s army in 1865.

It was added to the National Register of Historic Places in 1971.
