= Ridgeway Mine =

Open-pit mine in South Carolina, U.S.

Ridgeway mine
- Location in South Carolina Ridgeway mine (the United States)
- Location: Ridgeway, South Carolina, United States; 34.27°N 80.90°W
- Products: Gold; Silver
- Production: Gold: 1,500,000 ounces Silver: 900,000 ounces
- Type: open-pit
- Greatest depth: 420 feet (60 ft below sea level)
- Opened: 1988
- Closed: 1999
- Company: Kennecott Utah Copper
- Website: Kennecott Ridgeway Mining Company

The Ridgeway mine was a gold and silver open-pit mine near Ridgeway, South Carolina. In its eleven years of operation between 1988 and 1999, it produced 1,500,000 ounces of gold and 900,000 ounces of silver. The mine's two ore bodies are part of the gold-rich Carolina Slate Belt rock package that runs through the upstate Piedmont foothills. The operator of the mine, the Ridgeway Mining Company, is a subdivision of Kennecott Minerals. Kennecott is a subdivision of Rio Tinto which is one of the world's largest mining companies.

The mine faced fierce opposition from the local community while applying for permits and licensing from government regulators. These neighbors created Gold Camouflage, a group organized to bring legal and procedural challenges against the mine. Gold Camouflage was unable to stop the mine from opening and eventually settled with the owners. After the mine was exhausted, Ridgeway began reclamation of the mine which continues to this day. The mine's waste rock piles were covered with clay and grass to create an artificial hill and water is filling the mine pits to create two artificial lakes. Mine management hopes that one of the lakes will eventually be usable by the public for recreation.

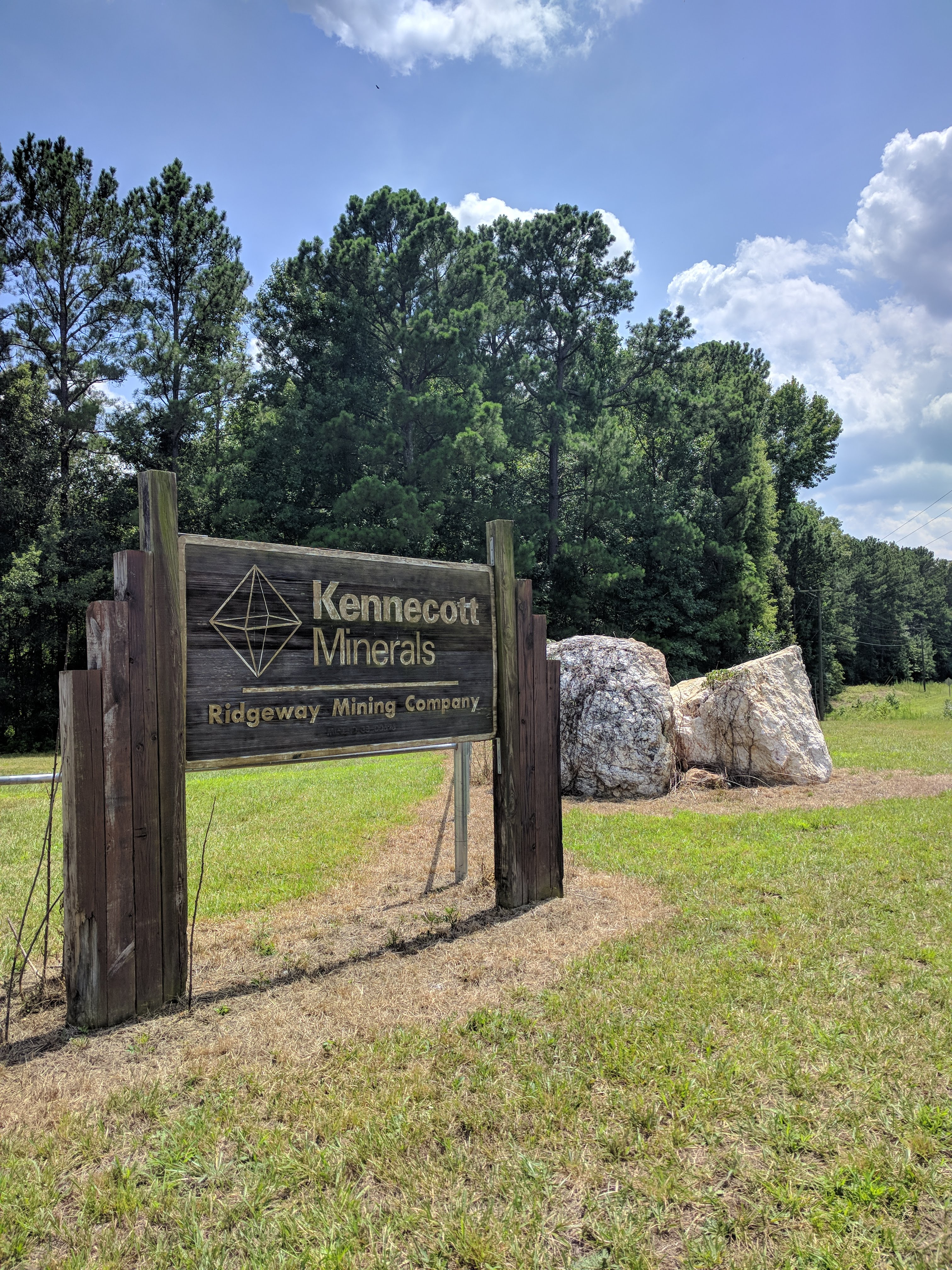
Ridgeway mine entrance

== Extraction ==
Two open pits were dug to extract the gold-bearing ore from the earth. Explosives were used to blast the ore out of the bottom of the mine pits. After the blast, the loose rocks were hauled in 85-ton trucks to temporary storage heaps near the edge of the pit at surface level. There was roughly one truckload of waste rock hauled out of the pit for every truckload of gold ore and each truckload of gold ore contained only 1.5 to 3 ounces of gold. Ridgeway's gold deposits were microscopic and a complex, multi-step process was needed to refine the heaps of ore into gold bars. A mill was used to crush the ore to an extremely fine powder of 200 mesh. This powder was soaked in a mixture of sodium cyanide, lime and water in one of ten giant tanks. While the powder soaks the tiny flecks of gold within the ore dissolve into the cyanide solution. After twenty-seven days the powder is removed and the remaining solution was filtered through activated charcoal which absorbs the gold out of the liquid in what is called a carbon in leach process. That gold-bearing carbon gets removed from the first solution and was put into a second solution that dissolves the gold for a second time. The second solution was put in a stripping column where high pressure vapor jets through the solution causing the dissolved gold to vaporize. The gold-bearing vapor escapes through the column and was captured and cooled to make a third solution. Once captured the third solution was used in an electrowinning process that uses electricity to deposit the gold out of the solution onto steel wool cathodes. This gold-plated steel wool undergoes a second round of electrowinning to deposit the gold onto stainless steel plates. At this point the gold deposits are thick enough to be mechanically scraped off of the stainless steel plates. The resulting scrapings were fed into a gold crucible and melted into doré bars.

== Geology ==
The Carolina Slate Belt (CSB) originated in the Proterozoic or Cambrian age with a volcanic arc terrane, a chain of volcanoes that form on the edge of one continental plate when it has another continental plate subducted under it. Another subduction of the eastern edge of the ancient North American continental plate (Laurentia) caused the Taconic orogeny and created a new mountain range on the eastern coast of North America. These new mountains eroded over time to form the Piedmont but while they stood their weight was just enough to metamorphose the old volcanic arc rocks into greenschist, a rock produced by some of the lowest metamorphic pressures. The eastern edge of the North American plate continued to be battered by the Avalonia continent, causing the Acadian orogeny, and the ancient African plate (Gondwana), causing the Alleghanian orogeny. These collisions squeezed the CSB, causing it to crack under pressure (shear) and creating intrusive granite from magma seeping up into the cracks.

The mine is located in a section of the CSB that trends from east to west. This is unusual for the CSB as it typically trends from northeast to southwest. To the north of the mine is a rock terrane called the Sawney's Creek volcanics and to its south is the Bear Creek turbidites. The Sawney's Creek terrane is older and was formed by volcanic activity. The newer Bear Creek turbidites were made from liquefied sediments that slid into place as part of a landslide. There are two mine pits and the gold ore in each one has its own unique geology. The North Pit's ore is a chert, a rock made from microscopic crystals of quartz that precipitated out of hot water from an underwater geothermal vent. These exhalative sediments need a deep geothermal vent whose water is hot enough to dissolve gold from inside the crust. The hot water precipitates the dissolved minerals onto the ocean floor as fine crystals when it mixes with cold ocean floor water and cools off. A later, epithermal (cooler geothermal vents closer to the surface) process concentrated the gold further by dissolving other minerals surrounding the gold and leaving the gold behind. The South Pit's ore is made from fine sediments of felsic (rich in feldspar and quartz) ash from a volcano that flowed underwater and settled into thin laminated layers.

== History ==
Gold was first found in the Carolina Slate Belt in 1827 at the Haile mine in nearby Lancaster County. Placer mining, hydraulic mining and later use of the Newbery-Vautin chlorination process kept South Carolina mines in operation but by the year 1900 mining became unprofitable and had mostly stopped. In the 1960s interest in mining the Ridgeway area increased after John Chapman found gold while panning in nearby creeks. Amselco Minerals, a company later merged with Kennecott Minerals, began investigating Ridgeway after geologist Irving T. Kiff noticed similarities between Ridgeway's slate outcrops and outcrops at the Haile mine. Kennecott Minerals began buying land for the Ridgeway mine in 1980 and began mining in 1988. For most of its life the Ridgeway Mine was the only active gold mine in the eastern United States.

=== Public opposition ===
If it wasn't illegal, I'd get my shotgun and run the damn mine out of here.

— A.W. "Buddy" Klasset

Some local residents opposed the opening of the mine and formally appealed permits granted by government environmental and land use regulators. As a part of the mine's refining operation waste rock soaked in a cyanide solution was trucked to an outdoor heap where the cyanide solution was allowed to drain off into a settling basin called the tailings pond. The opposition argued that this waste cyanide could potentially leak out of its containment into the groundwater killing aquatic wildlife or poisoning downstream civil water supplies. The tailings pond was also uncovered to allow water to evaporate but also allowing cyanide to enter the atmosphere or wildlife to drink from the contaminated pond. The mine pits were below the water table and dewatering pumps had to be installed to prevent the mine from flooding. These pumps lowered the groundwater levels around the mine and could potentially dry out nearby residential wells. The wastewater from these pumps had to be treated before it could be discharged into local creeks and risked harming the aquatic wildlife in those creeks. There was also opposition to the nuisances of the mine's operation, such as the dust and loud noises that come from blasting and the heavy machinery used to mine.

The organized front of the resistance was a group called Gold Camouflage who pursued legal challenges before mine permits were issued and demanded that regulators conduct a further review of the environmental hazards from the mine. Gold Camouflage first appealed to the EPA and the United States Army Corps of Engineers to conduct further studies on the project and halt South Carolina's permit-granting processes but were turned down by both in May and June 1987. On June 10, 1987 the South Carolina Department of Health and Environmental Control (DHEC) issued waste water and air permits to the mine with provisions to protect the thicklip chub in nearby Sawney's Creek. The next day the Land Resources Commission (LRC) granted a permit for the gold mine itself. Both permits had an appeal process, however, and Gold Camouflage pursued appeals against both on grounds of environmental and archaeological concerns. A public debate ensued that summer as both the Ridgeway Mining Company and Gold Camouflage took out full-page ads in the Sunday edition of The State newspaper on July 26. However, on February 26, 1988 Gold Camouflage announced that they had entered a settlement with the mine and DHEC to drop legal opposition to the permits in exchange for increased environmental monitoring of the mine and around $350,000 to cover Gold Camouflage's legal expenses. Some members of Gold Camouflage publicly contested the decision to settle, arguing that the decision was forced through by leadership and lacked popular consent. These members attempted to prevent the LRC from granting the mine a land use permit but were unsuccessful. On April 18, 1988 the LRC's Mining Council ruled to accept the settlement between Gold Camouflage and the Ridgeway Mining Company and issued the mine's final required permit, allowing the gold mine to open.

=== Accidents ===
The Ridgeway mine was a relatively safe operation, only killing three employees in eleven years of operation.

On August 18, 1988 James F. Wise, while working as a spotter for a pan scraper, was crushed to death when it backed over him. Roosevelt Williams, the scraper driver, was also injured and was sent to the hospital to receive first aid for minor injuries. Scraper drivers were taught to not start the vehicle until eye contact was made with the spotter and to keep the spotter in eyesight while driving. On the day of the accident Williams did not locate the spotter before moving and only watched the left side of the vehicle while backing it out. Wise was crushed under the right tires of the scraper.

On April 21, 1993 Johnny Ray fell to his death after he was pushed into the mine pit by a forklift. Steven Crapps, the forklift driver, was attempting to park the forklift by putting it in neutral and engaging the parking brake. However, he also turned off the forklift's engine which provides power to the hydraulic brake system pumps. Without brakes and with a failed backup breaking system the forklift rolled down a slope towards the edge of the mine pit. Ray, the victim, was between the forks of the forklift when it started rolling and was pushed into the pit where he suffered a drop of around 85 feet. Ray was evacuated by helicopter to a local hospital and later died from his injuries.

On February 2, 1997 Joseph Sumpter was fatally crushed by a runaway haulage truck. The truck, assigned to Sumpter for the day's work, had a bad battery and starter and had to be jump started by another vehicle. It also had a completely inoperable parking brake. His co-worker, Robert Stover, pulled his truck in front of Sumpter's truck to jump start it. Sumpter climbed across the engine decks of both trucks to connect jumper cables. Sumpter's truck was immobilized with a wooden chock but when Stover parked facing Sumpter's truck he pushed Sumpter's truck backward about two feet behind the chock. The jump start was successful and Stover backed his truck away while Sumpter was still climbing around the engine deck of the truck. Because the trucks were separated Sumpter's truck could now roll forward, continuing to run over the chock and down a hill. Sumpter held on to the engine deck while the truck rolled for around 57 feet, but near the end of the ride Sumpter fell off and was run over by the front wheel of the truck. Sumpter was pronounced dead at the scene.

On the weekend of December 3, 1988, soon after the mine began chemically processing the mined ore, a flock of around 400 sea gulls landed in and around the tailings pond and 65 of the seagulls died. Ridgeway Mining had installed scare cannons to prevent birds from landing in the cyanide pond but in this case it was ineffective. The South Carolina Department of Natural Resources levied a $6,500 fine against Ridgeway Mining for killing the birds.

=== Closure ===
Mining stopped in the South Pit mine in September 1996 and the North Pit shut down in November 1999. Ore processing finished on December 3, 1999. The Confederate States Mint struck commemorative gold, silver and bronze coins with metal from the mine and sold them to the general public. The coins were marketed as wholly South Carolina gold and featured a local building used by the Confederate army during the American Civil War. The Ridgeway Mining Company also commissioned the Confederate States Mint to mint a coin out of the mine's gold and silver which it gave to the mine employees as gifts.

== Reclamation ==
Ridgeway began the mine reclamation process in 1999 after processing the last of the gold ore from the mine. The mine tailings (waste rock) needed to be contained and the North and South pits had to be flooded. The tailings at the Ridgeway mine are a pyrite-bearing rock which, when exposed to water and oxygen, causes acid rock drainage and environmental damage. Ridgeway designed an impoundment for the tailings that seals them off from both runoff (water) and the atmosphere (oxygen). If fresh water was allowed to run through the tailings it would constantly dissolve and oxidize the rock's sulfides. Ridgeway chose to keep the tailings in stagnant water that has already had a chance to fully saturate with sulfides. The tailing impoundment was created by saturating the tailings with water, mining nearby saprolites and clay, sending the saprolites and clay through the ore mills and pouring them over the existing pile of tailings to create a layer over it. The impoundment was then graded to give it steep sides and a flat top and grass was planted on it to prevent erosion. The Ridgeway mine recovery has been an ecological success with minimal seepage of acid water into the environment, a stark contrast to the nearby Barite Hill and Brewer gold mines that were both declared Superfund sites after being abandoned by their owners.

Both mine pits are expected to fill with water by 2020 and the public may be able to access the South Pit Lake. To make the lake safe for public use and to control environmental hazards management hopes to turn it into a meromictic lake, a self-regulated lake with distinct layers of water that do not mix. To see if this was possible the South Pit Lake's physical, chemical and biological properties were measured in a limnology study from 2000 to 2004. The lake successfully achieved meromixis in the winter of 2001 and maintained it until the end of the study in 2004.

== Future mining ==
The Strongbow Exploration company announced that it was investigating a possible new strike of gold within three miles of Rio Tinto's Ridgeway mine in 2011. After releasing several press releases announcing positive test results from drilling samples and the signing of property purchase option agreements with landowners there has been no further communication on their Ridgeway exploration since December 2012.
