= Blink Bonnie (Ridgeway, South Carolina) =

Historic house in South Carolina, United States

- U.S. National Register of Historic Places
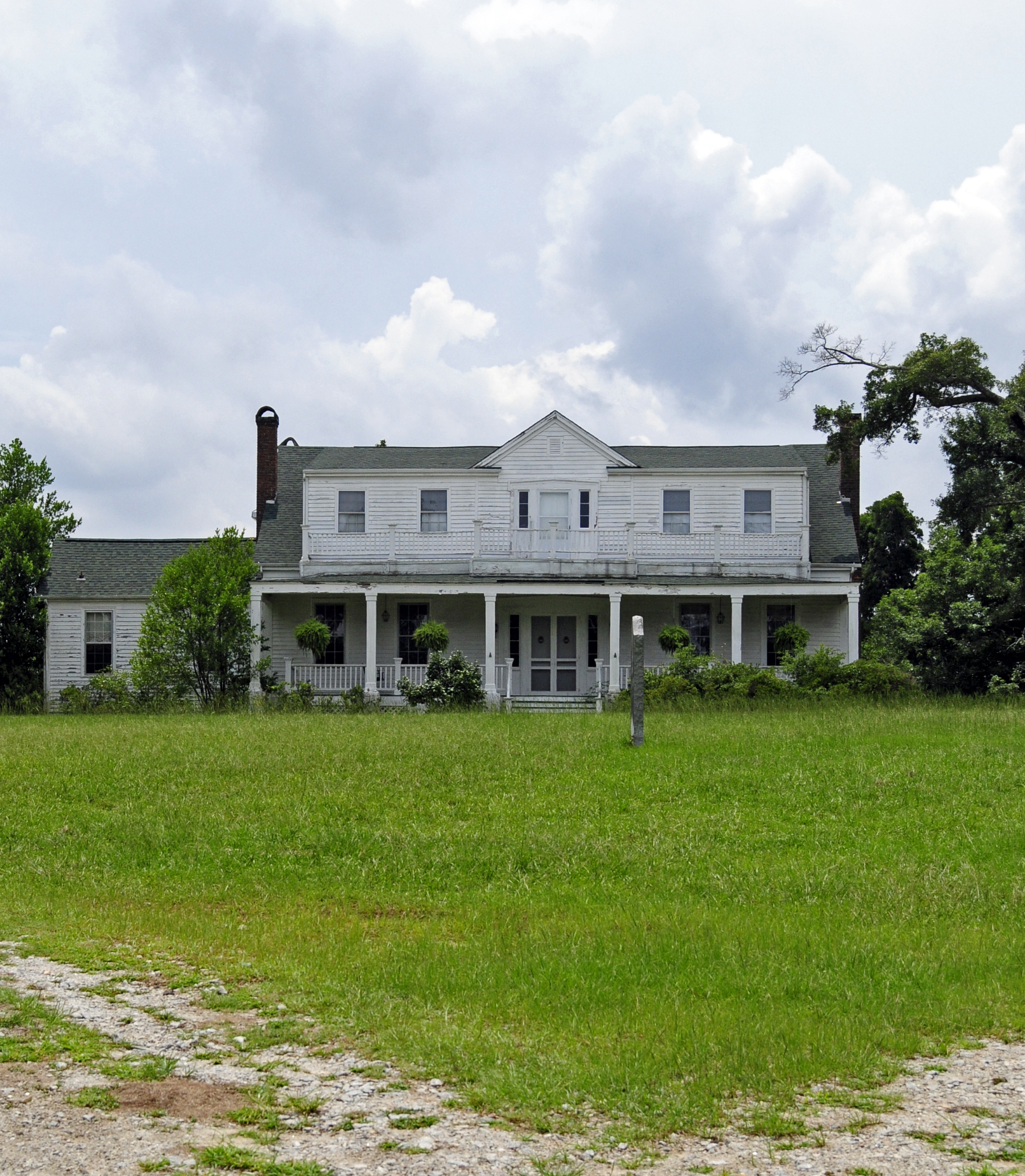
- Blink Bonnie, July 2012

- Location within South Carolina Location within the United States
- Location: About 10 miles northeast of Ridgeway, near Ridgeway, South Carolina
- Coordinates: 34°20′15″N 80°49′14″W
- Area: 0 acres (0 ha)
- Built: 1822
- NRHP reference No.: 72001209
- Added to NRHP: April 13, 1972

Blink Bonnie, also known as Robertson House, is a historic plantation house located near Ridgeway, Fairfield County, South Carolina. It was built in 1822 and is a 1-½ story clapboard frame house on a brick foundation. It features a one-story, hipped-roof front porch supported by six double-capped square columns. The house has a one-story addition and an old two-room brick kitchen with large, open fireplaces, ovens, and warmers.

It was added to the National Register of Historic Places in 1972.
