= Lake Wateree =

Man-made lake in South Carolina, United States

- Location within South Carolina
- Location: Kershaw / Fairfield / Lancaster counties, South Carolina, US
- Coordinates: 34°24′40″N 80°47′32″W
- Type: Reservoir
- Primary inflows: Catawba River
- Primary outflows: Wateree River
- Basin countries: United States
- Surface area: 13,864 acres (56.11 km^{2}; 21.66 mi^{2})
- Average depth: 23 feet (7.0 m)
- Max. depth: 19.5 metres (64 ft)
- Residence time: 27 days
- Shore length^{1}: 181 miles (291 km)
- Surface elevation: 226 feet (68.9 m)
- ^{1} Shore length is not a well-defined measure.

Lake Wateree is a 21-square-mile (50 km^{2}) reservoir in Kershaw, Fairfield, and Lancaster counties, South Carolina, in the United States. Developed in 1919 by the damming of the Wateree River, it is one of South Carolina's oldest man-made lakes. It has 181 miles (291 km) of shoreline and includes Lake Wateree State Park, a bird refuge, and Shaw Air Force Base Recreation Center.

It was named after the river, and both were named for the Wateree Native Americans, an historic tribe who lived in the area before European settlement. They became extinct as a tribe after European warfare and encroachment, and their descendants merged with the Catawba people.

== Location ==
The lake is surrounded by three South Carolina counties: Kershaw, Fairfield and Lancaster. It is about 30 miles (48 km) northeast of the capital Columbia. I-77 passes west of the lake, and it is accessible via SC 97.

== Origin ==
Duke Power (now Duke Energy) dammed the Wateree River to generate hydroelectric power, and flooded a large area in 1919, creating Lake Wateree. The Wateree Hydro Station produces 56 megawatts of electricity. The lake covers nearly 14,000 acres (57 km^{2}) with 190 miles (310 km) of shoreline touching three counties. The lake is an average of 23 feet (7.0 m) deep with an estimated volume of 1.35×10^{10} cubic feet (3.82×10^{8} m^{3}).

== Wildlife ==
Lake Wateree is known for its fishing and bountiful wildlife around the shoreline. The fish include Largemouth Bass, Striped bass, White Perch, White bass, Crappie, Channel catfish, Arkansas Blue Catfish, Shellcrackers, Bream.

Other wildlife in the area include deer, fox, squirrel, turtle, dove, turkey, alligator, and various species of duck, hawk, eagle, egret, Heron and osprey.

== See also ==
- Camden, South Carolina
- Great Falls, South Carolina
- Mitford, South Carolina
- List of lakes in South Carolina
