= Adger, South Carolina =

Unincorporated community in South Carolina

Coordinates: 34°26′12″N 81°07′32″W

Adger is an unincorporated community in Fairfield County, in the U.S. state of South Carolina.

== History ==
Adger was established in 1850 when the railroad was extended to that point, and was named for the Adger family of settlers. A variant name is "Adgers".
