= Kincaid-Anderson House =

Historic house in South Carolina, United States

- U.S. National Register of Historic Places
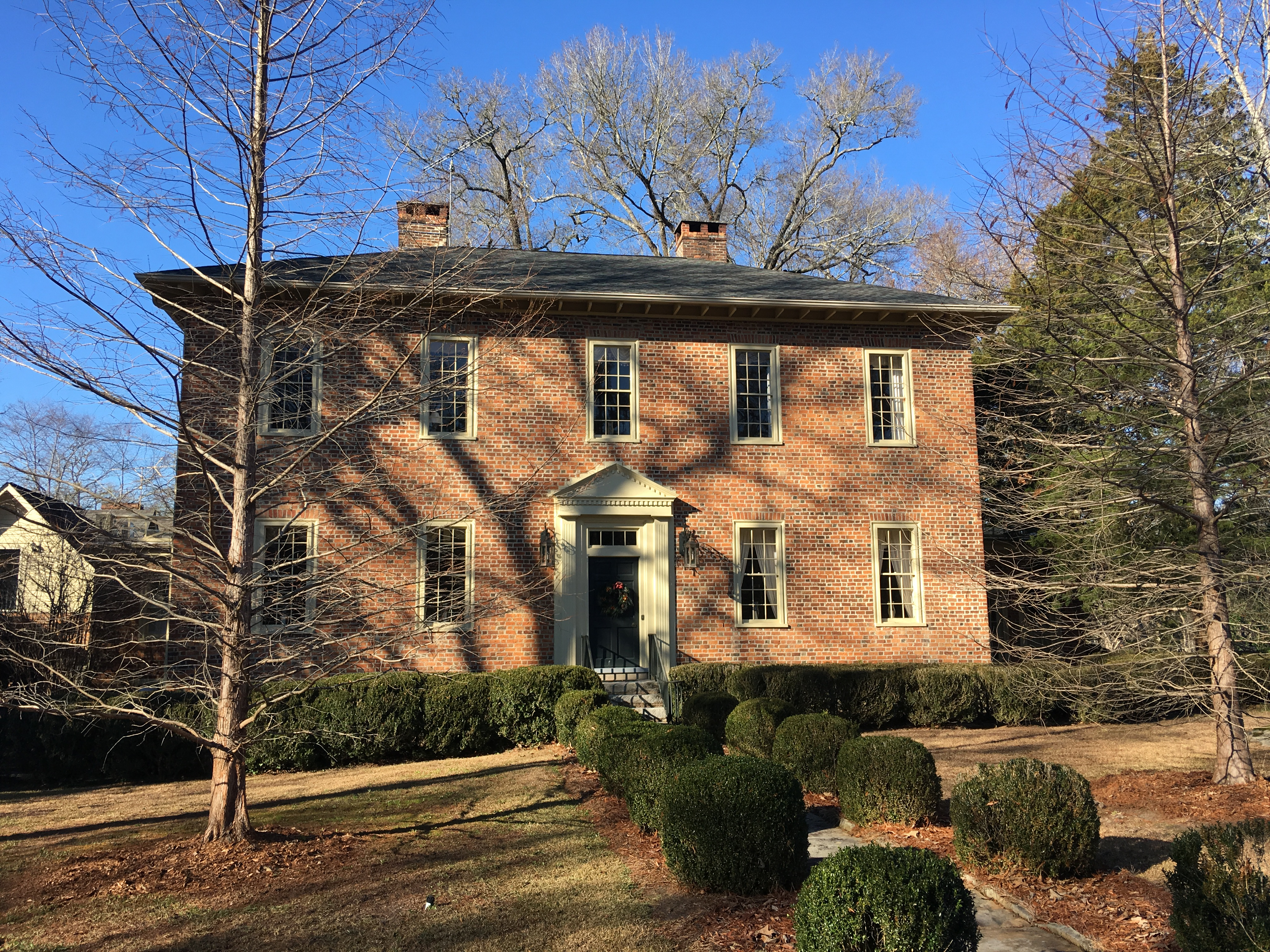

- Location within South Carolina Location within the United States
- Location: NE of Jenkinsville of SC 213, Jenkinsville, South Carolina
- Coordinates: 34°19′10″N 81°14′32″W
- Area: 6 acres (2.4 ha)
- Built: 1774
- Architectural style: Georgian
- NRHP reference No.: 74001852
- Added to NRHP: July 30, 1974

Kincaid-Anderson House, also known as Fairfield, is a historic home located near Jenkinsville, Fairfield County, South Carolina. It was built about 1774, and is a two-story, brick Georgian style dwelling. It has a hipped roof and sits on a fieldstone foundation. It has small brick side wings that were added in a 1920s restoration. Also on the property is a two-story brick and frame work house that has been converted into a guesthouse. It was the home of James Kincaid, who was one of the first purchasers of cotton in the South Carolina upcountry and was possibly involved in the early development of a cotton gin.

It was added to the National Register of Historic Places in 1974.
