= Fairfield County Airport (South Carolina) =

Airport in South Carolina, United States

Coordinates: 34°18′56″N 081°06′32″W

- IATA: none; ICAO: KFDW; FAA LID: FDW

Summary
- Airport type: Public
- Owner: Fairfield County
- Serves: Winnsboro, South Carolina
- Elevation AMSL: 577 ft (176 m)
- Interactive map of Fairfield County Airport

Runways
Direction	Length		Surface
Direction	ft	m	Surface
4/22	5,243	1,598	Asphalt

Statistics (2019)
- Aircraft operations (year ending 5/8/2019): 7,300
- Based aircraft: 36
- Source: Federal Aviation Administration

Fairfield County Airport (ICAO: KFDW, FAA LID: FDW) is a public airport located three miles (5 km) southwest of the central business district of Winnsboro, in Fairfield County, South Carolina, United States. It is owned by Fairfield County.

Although most U.S. airports use the same three-letter location identifier for the FAA and IATA, Fairfield County Airport is assigned FDW by the FAA but has no designation from the IATA.

== Facilities and aircraft ==
Fairfield County Airport covers an area of 159 acres (64 ha) which contains one asphalt paved runway (4/22) measuring 5,243 x 100 ft (1,598 x 30 m).

For the 12-month period ending May 8, 2019, the airport had 7,300 aircraft operations, an average of 20 per day: 92% general aviation, 4% air taxi and 4% military. There was at that time 36 aircraft based at this airport: 32 single engine and 4 multi-engine.

The on location fixed-base operator is S&S Aviation.

== See also ==
- List of airports in South Carolina
