= Jenkinsville, South Carolina =

- Town
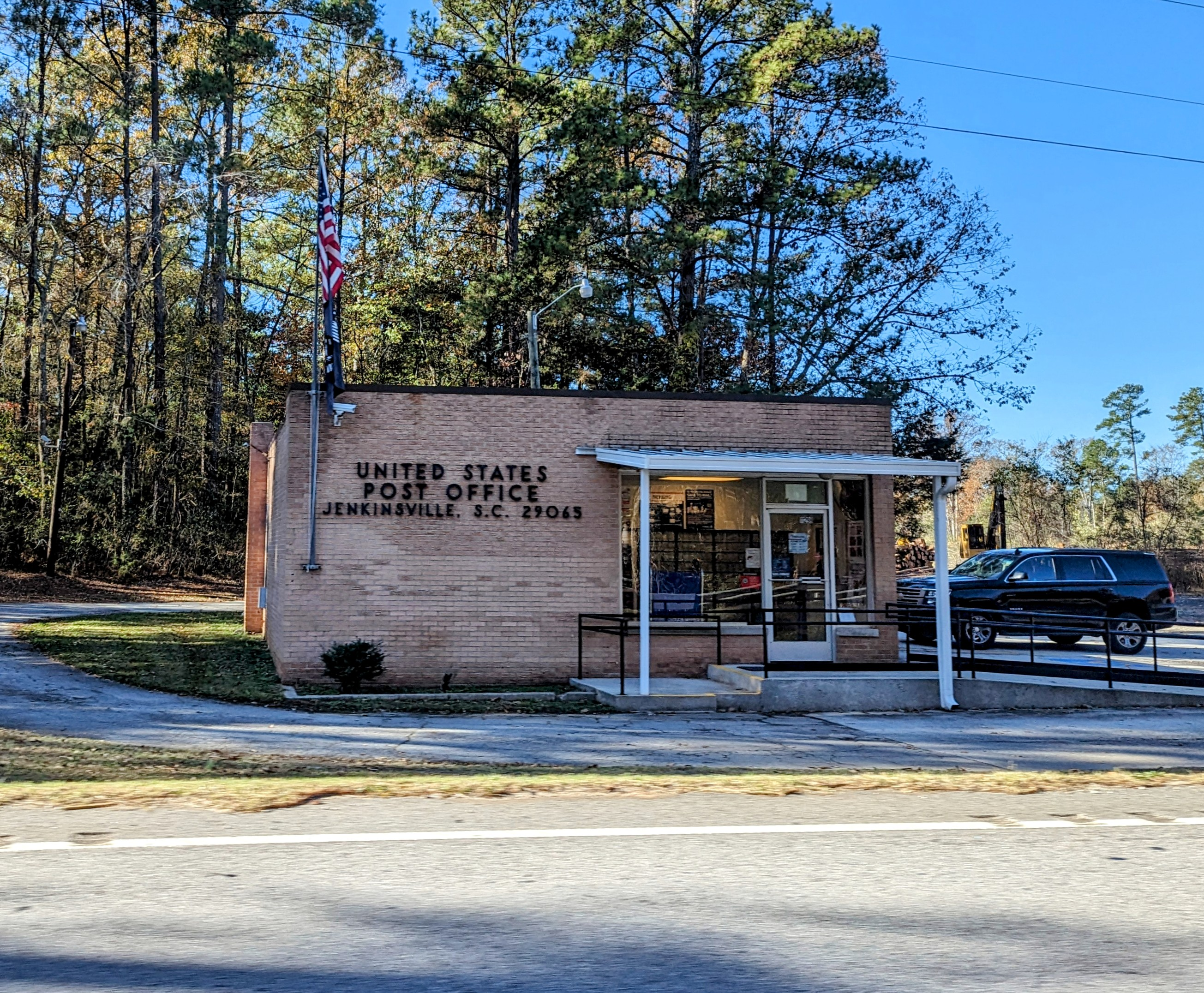
- Jenkinsville Post Office

- Location within South Carolina Location within the United States
- Coordinates: 34°18′36″N 81°17′12″W
- Country: United States
- State: South Carolina
- County: Fairfield

Area
  - Total: 0.089 sq mi (0.23 km^{2})
  - Land: 0.089 sq mi (0.23 km^{2})
  - Water: 0 sq mi (0.00 km^{2})
- Elevation: 466 ft (142 m)

Population (2020)
  - Total: 40
  - Density: 448.4/sq mi (173.14/km^{2})
- Time zone: UTC-5 (EST)
  - Summer (DST): UTC-4 (EDT)
- ZIP code: 29065
- Area codes: 803, 839
- FIPS code: 45-36655
- GNIS feature ID: 2542194

Jenkinsville is an incorporated town in western Fairfield County, South Carolina, United States, between the Broad and the Little rivers. It is located east of Monticello Reservoir and is near the Virgil C. Summer Nuclear Generating Station. Also in the area is the Kincaid-Anderson House and quarry. The town was incorporated in 2008. As of the 2020 census, Jenkinsville had a population of 40.

In addition to the Kincaid-Anderson House, the Ebenezer Associate Reformed Presbyterian Church, Dr. John Glenn House, High Point, Little River Baptist Church, and Mayfair are listed on the National Register of Historic Places.

== Demographics ==
Historical population
Census	Pop.	Note	%±
2010	46		—
2020	40		−13.0%
U.S. Decennial Census

Jenkinsville first appeared as a town in the 2010 U.S. census.

=== 2020 census ===
Jenkinsville town, South Carolina – Racial and ethnic composition Note: the US Census treats Hispanic/Latino as an ethnic category. This table excludes Latinos from the racial categories and assigns them to a separate category. Hispanics/Latinos may be of any race.
Race / Ethnicity (NH = Non-Hispanic)	Pop 2010	Pop 2020	% 2010	% 2020
White alone (NH)	0	1	0.00%	2.50%
Black or African American alone (NH)	46	35	100.00%	87.50%
Native American or Alaska Native alone (NH)	0	0	0.00%	0.00%
Asian alone (NH)	0	0	0.00%	0.00%
Native Hawaiian or Pacific Islander alone (NH)	0	0	0.00%	0.00%
Other race alone (NH)	0	0	0.00%	0.00%
Mixed race or Multiracial (NH)	0	3	0.00%	7.50%
Hispanic or Latino (any race)	0	1	0.00%	2.50%
Total	46	40	100.00%	100.00%

=== 2010 census ===
As of the 2010 United States census, there were 46 people living in the town. 100.0% were African American.
