= Ridgeway, South Carolina =

- Town
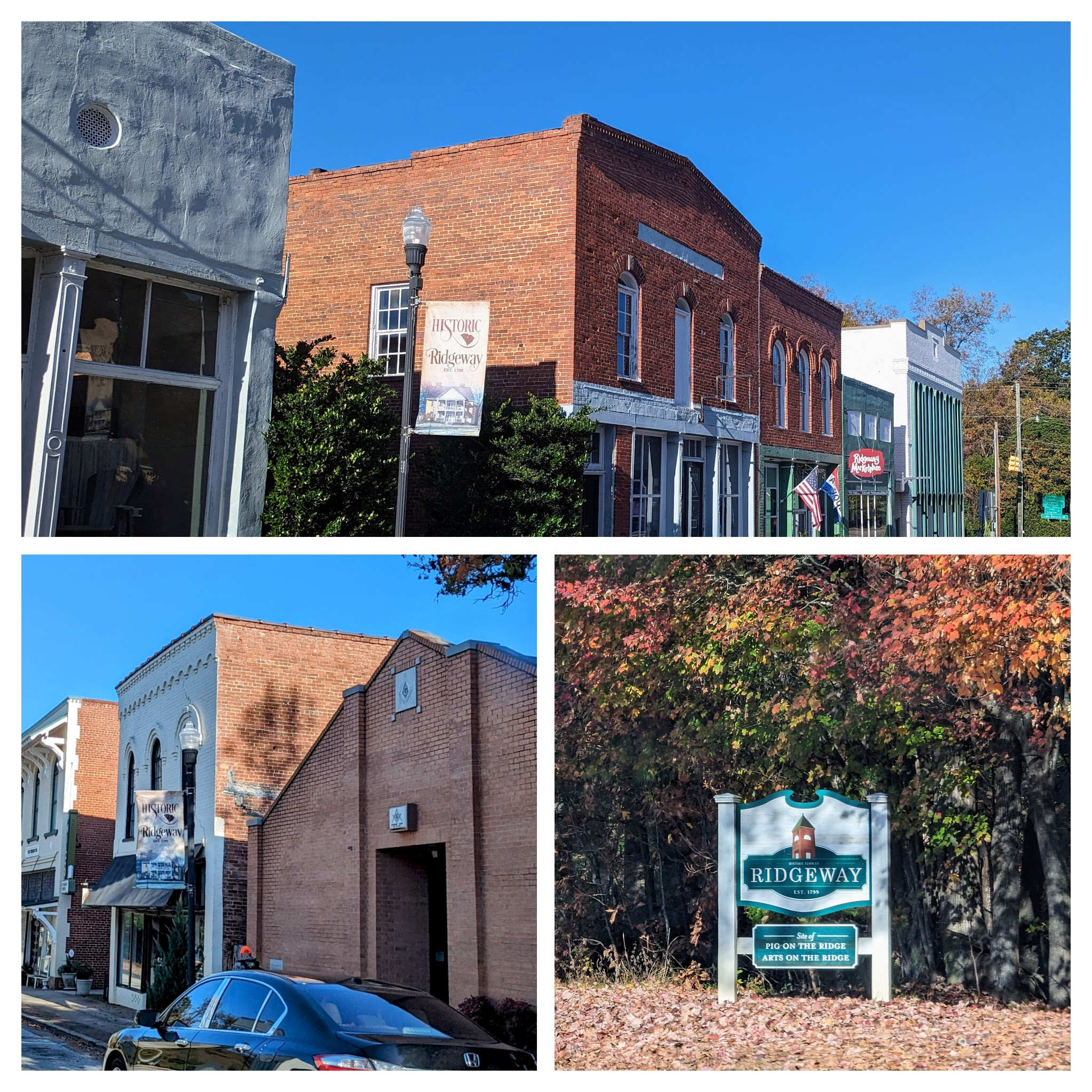
- Top, left: South Palmer Street, right: Ridgeway welcome sign

- Seal
- Motto: "Revitalization, Responsibility, Relationships"
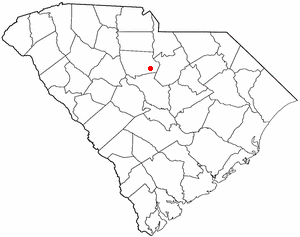
- Location of Ridgeway, South Carolina
- Coordinates: 34°18′24″N 80°57′36″W
- Country: United States
- State: South Carolina
- County: Fairfield

Area
  - Total: 0.49 sq mi (1.26 km^{2})
  - Land: 0.49 sq mi (1.26 km^{2})
  - Water: 0 sq mi (0.00 km^{2})
- Elevation: 620 ft (190 m)

Population (2020)
  - Total: 266
  - Density: 548.8/sq mi (211.91/km^{2})
- Time zone: UTC-5 (Eastern (EST))
  - Summer (DST): UTC-4 (EDT)
- ZIP code: 29130
- Area codes: 803, 839
- FIPS code: 45-60415
- GNIS feature ID: 2407218
- Website: townofridgeway.com

Ridgeway is a town in southeast Fairfield County, South Carolina, United States. As of the 2020 census, Ridgeway had a population of 266. It is part of the Columbia, South Carolina metropolitan statistical area.

== History ==
Blink Bonnie, Camp Welfare, Century House, Hunter House, Mount Hope, Ridgeway Historic District, Ruff's Chapel, St. Stephen's Episcopal Church, Valencia, Vaughn's Stage Coach Stop, and the Monroe Wilson House are listed on the National Register of Historic Places.

== Geography ==
Ridgeway is located in southeastern Fairfield County. U.S. Route 21 passes through the towns, leading north 19 miles (31 km) to Great Falls and south 24 miles (39 km) to Columbia. South Carolina Highway 34 leads west 2 miles (3 km) to Interstate 77 and east 17 miles (27 km) to Lugoff. Winnsboro, the county seat, is 11 miles (18 km) to the northwest via SC 34.

According to the United States Census Bureau, Ridgeway has a total area of 0.50 square miles (1.3 km^{2}), all land.

== Demographics ==
Historical population
Census	Pop.	Note	%±
1890	249		—
1900	334		34.1%
1910	370		10.8%
1920	429		15.9%
1930	404		−5.8%
1940	408		1.0%
1950	414		1.5%
1960	417		0.7%
1970	437		4.8%
1980	343		−21.5%
1990	407		18.7%
2000	328		−19.4%
2010	319		−2.7%
2020	266		−16.6%
U.S. Decennial Census

As of the 2000 census, 328 people, 138 households, and 96 families were residing in the town. The population density was 692.7 inhabitants per square mile (267.5/km^{2}). The 157 housing units had an average density of 331.6 per square mile (128.0/km^{2}). The racial makeup of the town was 60.37% White, 37.50% African American, 0.30% Native American, 0.30% from other races, and 1.52% from two or more races.

Of the 138 households, 27.5% had children under the age of 18 living with them, 50.0% were married couples living together, 18.1% had a female householder with no husband present, and 30.4% were not families. About 27.5% of all households were made up of individuals, and 10.9% had someone living alone who was 65 or older. The average household size was 2.38 and the average family size was 2.91.

In the town, the age distribution was 23.5% under 18, 4.6% from 18 to 24, 30.5% from 25 to 44, 28.0% from 45 to 64, and 13.4% who were 65 or older. The median age was 41 years. For every 100 females, there were 80.2 males. For every 100 females 18 and over, there were 78.0 males.

The median income in the town for a household was $36,250 and for a family was $49,375. Males had a median income of $35,833 versus $25,469 for females. The per capita income for the town was $14,884. About 24.1% of families and 25.3% of the population were below the poverty line, including 30.1% of those under 18 and 34.2% of those 65 or over.

== Education ==
Ridgeway has a public library, a branch of the Fairfield County Library.

== Notable people ==
- Mamie "Peanut" Johnson, professional baseball pitcher.
- Alex Sanders, politician and professor.
- Lil Ru, rapper.
