= Old Brick Church (Manhattan) =

Former church in Manhattan, New York

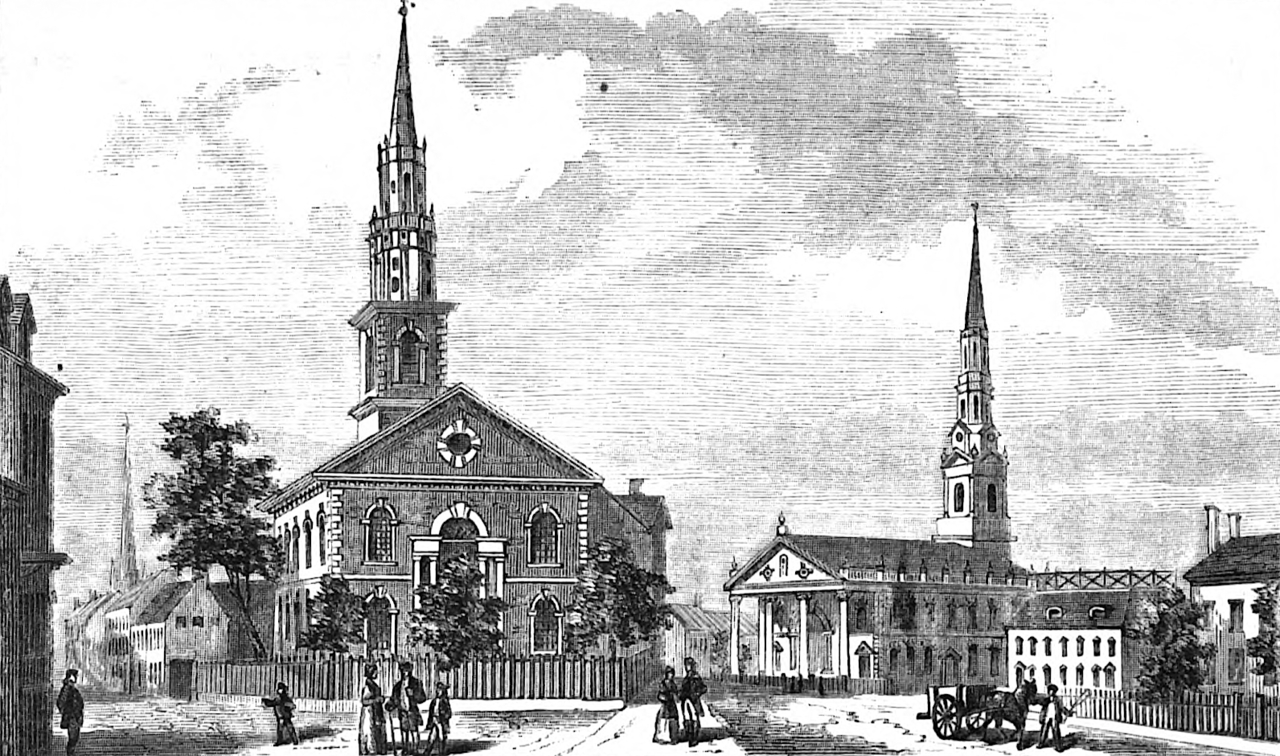
- Old Brick Church (left) and St. Paul's Chapel (right) in 1840.
- Interactive map of the Old Brick Church area

General information
- Location: Manhattan, New York City
- Coordinates: 40°42′40.4″N 74°0′22.8″W
- Opened: 1767
- Demolished: 1857

The Old Brick Church was the predecessor church building for the congregation of Brick Presbyterian Church, which is now located on the Upper East Side of Manhattan, New York City. The Old Brick Church was located on the northwest corner of Beekman and Nassau Streets, in what is now the Financial District, Manhattan. It was built 1767 by John McComb Sr., father of both the architect John McComb Jr. and the civil engineer Isaac McComb. The five-bay double-height church was rectangular in plan with a projecting square-in-plan four-stage tower (final stage setback) with a three-stage round colonnaded spire extension.

The building was demolished around 1857. The land the church stood on is now occupied by a building used by Pace College.

The structure was illustrated in 1856 for Frank Leslie’s Illustrated Newspaper, which reported that the land was "probably the most valuable in the city." The city planned to put a post office on the site that year, but the deal fell through, and "the congregation managed to sell the property to the New York Times which put up a building on the site in 1857–1858."
