= Winnsboro Mills, South Carolina =

- Census-designated place
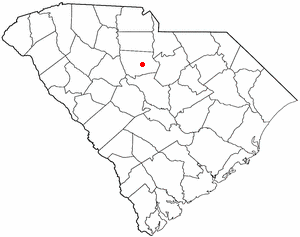
- Location of Winnsboro Mills, South Carolina
- Coordinates: 34°21′22″N 81°04′14″W
- Country: United States
- State: South Carolina
- County: Fairfield

Area
  - Total: 2.57 sq mi (6.66 km^{2})
  - Land: 2.57 sq mi (6.66 km^{2})
  - Water: 0 sq mi (0.00 km^{2})
- Elevation: 472 ft (144 m)

Population (2020)
  - Total: 1,632
  - Density: 634.7/sq mi (245.06/km^{2})
- Time zone: UTC-5 (Eastern (EST))
  - Summer (DST): UTC-4 (EDT)
- ZIP code: 29180
- Area codes: 803 and 839
- FIPS code: 45-78505
- GNIS feature ID: 2403035

Winnsboro Mills is an unincorporated community and census-designated place (CDP) in Fairfield County, South Carolina, United States. The population was 1,898 at the 2010 census, down from 2,263 at the 2000 census. It is part of the Columbia, South Carolina Metropolitan Statistical Area.

== Geography ==
Winnsboro Mills is located southeast of the center of Fairfield County. It is bordered to the north by the town of Winnsboro, the county seat. U.S. Route 321 Business (Columbia Road) is the main road through the community.

According to the United States Census Bureau, the CDP has a total area of 2.6 square miles (6.8 km^{2}), all of it land.

== Demographics ==
Historical population
Census	Pop.	Note	%±
2020	1,632		—
U.S. Decennial Census

As of the census of 2000, there were 2,263 people, 885 households, and 593 families residing in the CDP. The population density was 819.9 inhabitants per square mile (316.6/km^{2}). There were 1,005 housing units at an average density of 364.1 per square mile (140.6/km^{2}). The racial makeup of the CDP was 54.75% White, 41.32% African American, 0.40% Native American, 0.53% Asian, 1.86% from other races, and 1.15% from two or more races. Hispanic or Latino of any race were 3.31% of the population.

There were 885 households, out of which 35.0% had children under the age of 18 living with them, 41.5% were married couples living together, 20.0% had a female householder with no husband present, and 32.9% were non-families. 29.5% of all households were made up of individuals, and 12.8% had someone living alone who was 65 years of age or older. The average household size was 2.55 and the average family size was 3.16.

In the CDP, the population was spread out, with 29.1% under the age of 18, 10.3% from 18 to 24, 28.7% from 25 to 44, 19.8% from 45 to 64, and 12.1% who were 65 years of age or older. The median age was 32 years. For every 100 females, there were 91.9 males. For every 100 females age 18 and over, there were 87.2 males.

The median income for a household in the CDP was $25,160, and the median income for a family was $28,357. Males had a median income of $25,305 versus $19,597 for females. The per capita income for the CDP was $12,841. About 16.7% of families and 22.2% of the population were below the poverty line, including 31.8% of those under age 18 and 25.5% of those age 65 or over.
