= Brick Presbyterian Church Complex (Rochester, New York) =

Historic church in New York, United States

- U.S. National Register of Historic Places
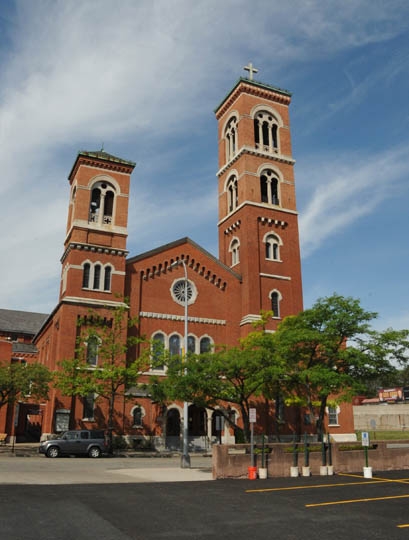

- Location within New York Location within the United States
- Location: 121 N. Fitzhugh St., Rochester, New York
- Coordinates: 43°9′27″N 77°37′1″W
- Area: 0.7 acres (0.28 ha)
- Built: 1860
- Architect: Warner, Andrew J.; Warner, J. Foster
- Architectural style: Colonial Revival, Early Romanesque Revival
- MPS: Inner Loop MRA
- NRHP reference No.: 92000152
- Added to NRHP: March 12, 1992

Brick Presbyterian Church Complex, now known as Downtown United Presbyterian Church, is a historic Presbyterian church complex located at Rochester in Monroe County, New York. The complex includes the Brick Church and Church School (1860, rebuilt 1903), attached Brick Church Institute building (1909–1910), and Taylor Chapel (1941). The Brick Church and Church School was designed in 1860 as an Early Romanesque Revival–style edifice by Rochester architect Andrew Jackson Warner (1833–1910). His son, J. Foster Warner (1859–1937), modified the church structure to the Lombard Romanesque form in 1903.

It was listed on the National Register of Historic Places in 1992.

== See also ==
- National Register of Historic Places listings in Rochester, New York
