= Old Brick Church (Iowa City, Iowa) =

- North Presbyterian Church
- U.S. National Register of Historic Places
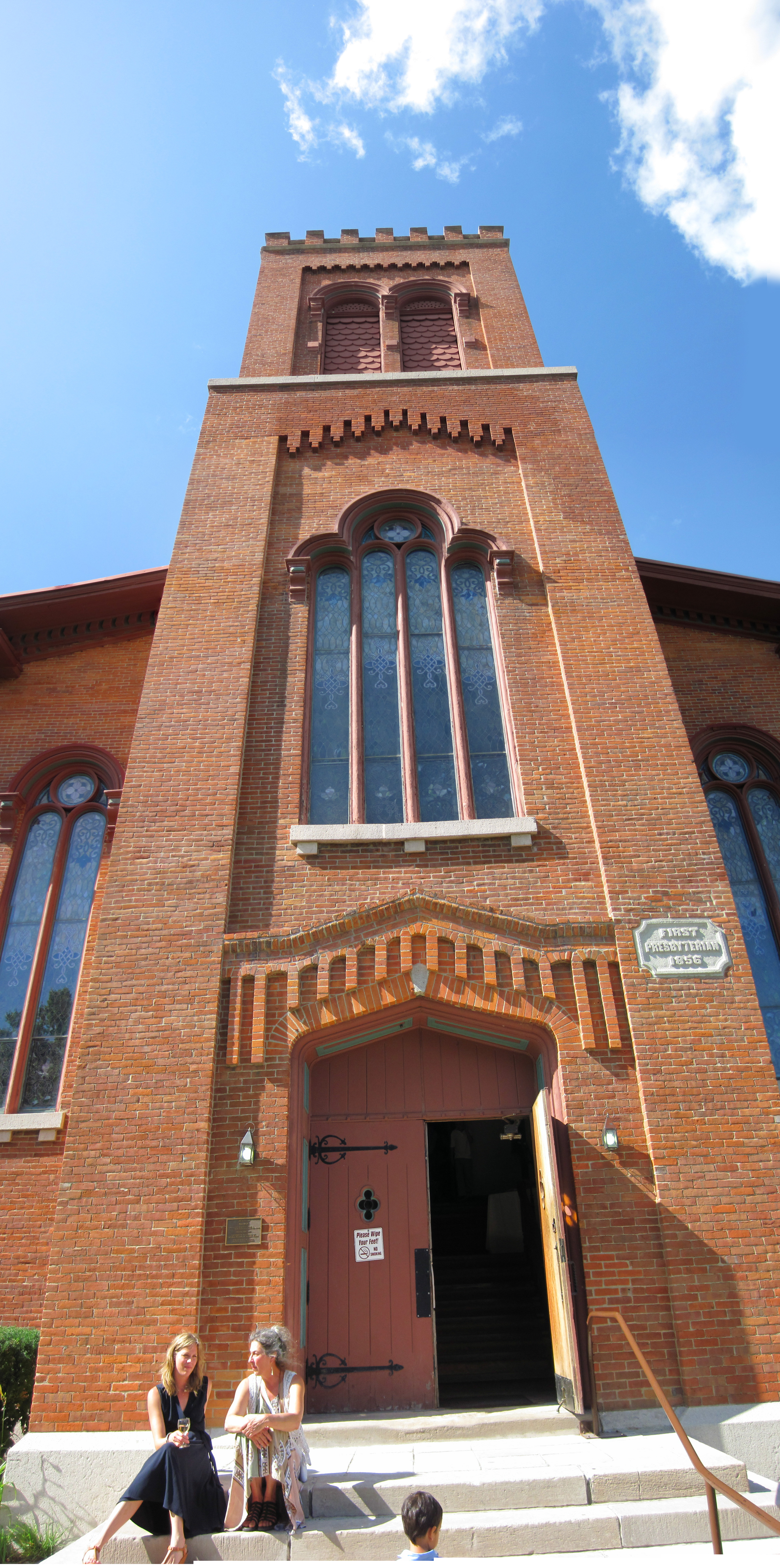

- Location within Iowa Location within the United States
- Location: 26 E. Market St. Iowa City, Iowa
- Coordinates: 41°39′50″N 91°32′4″W
- Built: 1856
- Architectural style: Romanesque
- NRHP reference No.: 73000730
- Added to NRHP: August 28, 1973

Old Brick Church, once known as First Presbyterian or North Presbyterian, is an event venue in Iowa City, Iowa. One of the few surviving pre-Civil War structures in Iowa City, Old Brick was built in 1856 at the site of an older Presbyterian church that had burned. Its steeple was demolished in an 1877 wind storm, it was rebuilt with a crenellated belfry, giving it a distinctive appearance. Last used as a church in 1970, Old Brick was listed on the National Register of Historic Places in 1973 as North Presbyterian Church. In 1974 the University of Iowa purchased the property and intended to demolish the church to make way for a parking lot, but public protest prevented the demolition. This public protest manifested in the formation of Friends of Old Brick, the organization that purchased the structure in 1977. Old Brick changed ownership again in 1987, when Old Brick Episcopal Lutheran Corporation (the current owner) purchased the building. Old Brick now thrives as an event venue and community center, hosting such diverse events as weddings, memorials, religious services, academic lectures, humanitarian fundraisers, and dance lessons. Old Brick also houses several non-profit offices.

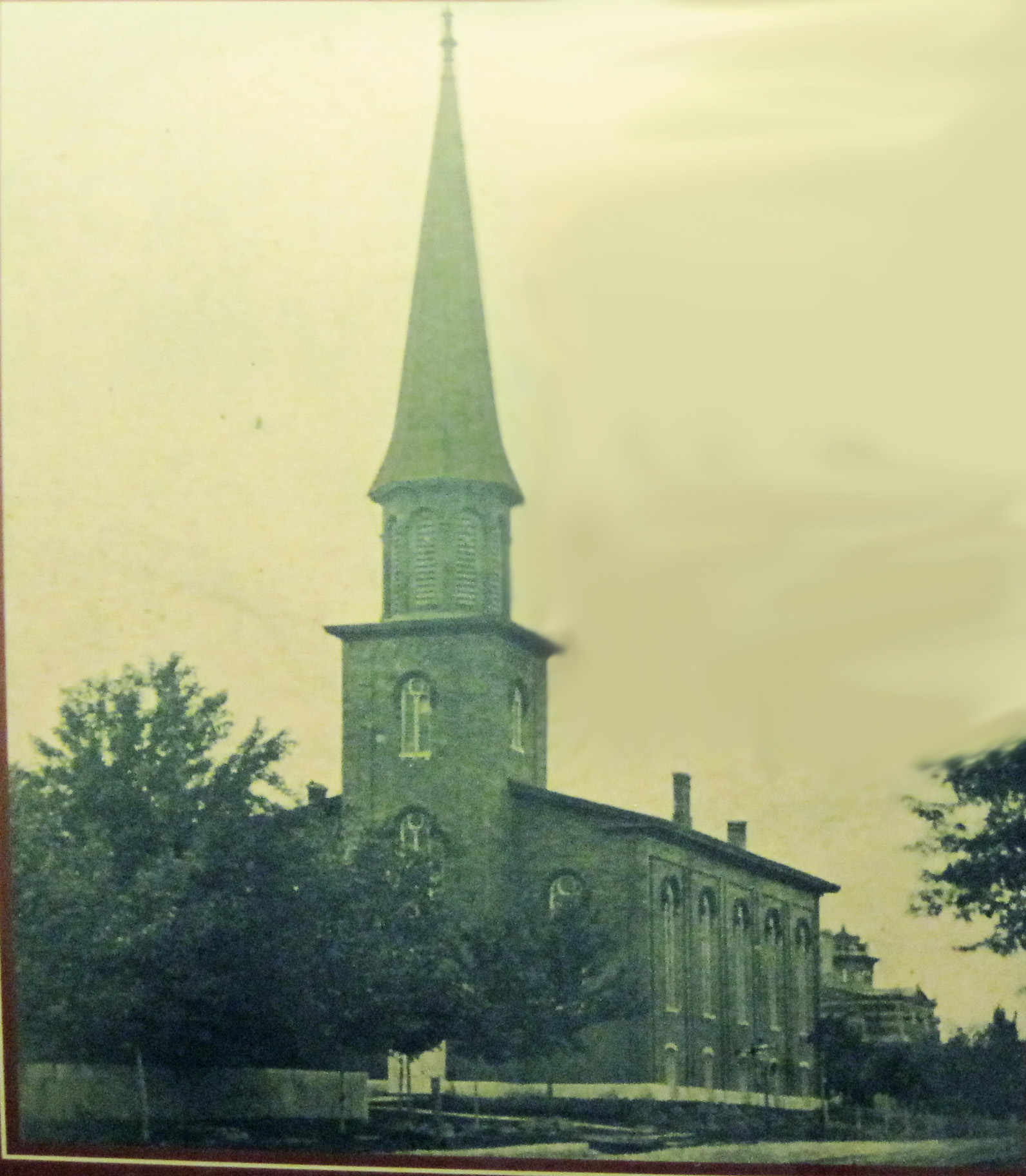
Old Brick, 1876, with original steeple

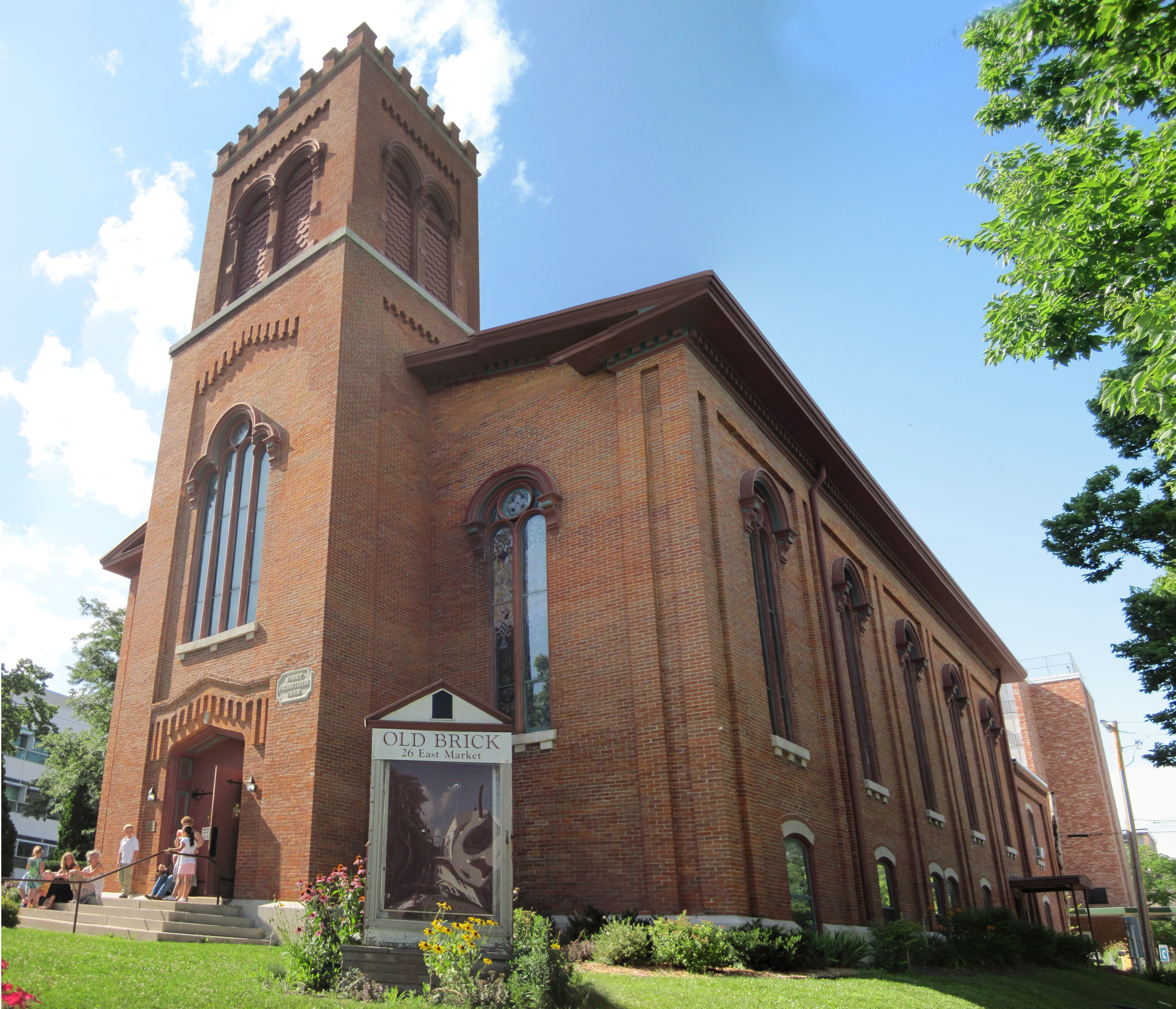
Old Brick

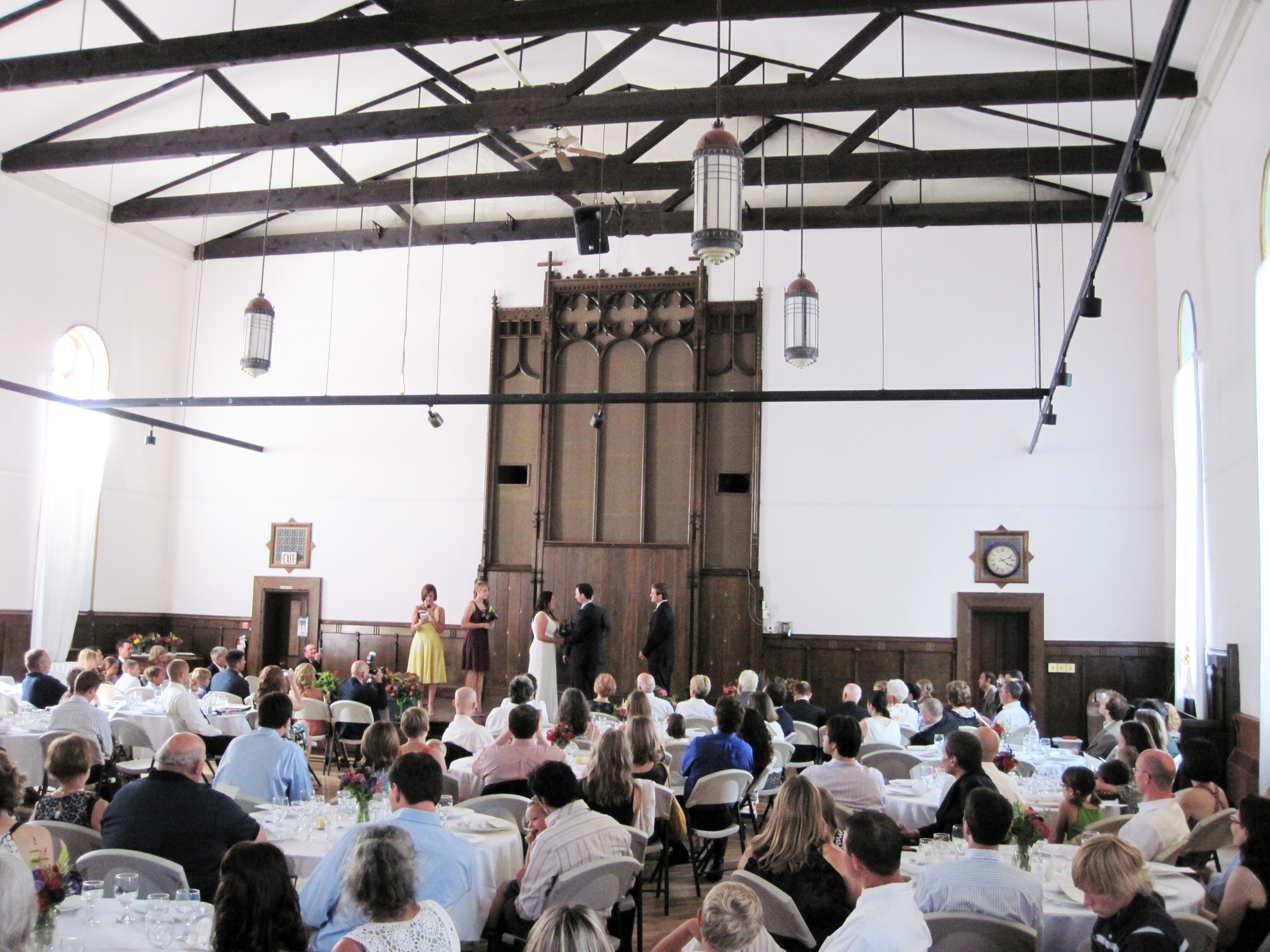
Main Hall, Old Brick
