= Old Brick Church (Fairfield County, South Carolina) =

Historic church in South Carolina, United States

- Ebenezer Associate Reformed Presbyterian Church
- U.S. National Register of Historic Places
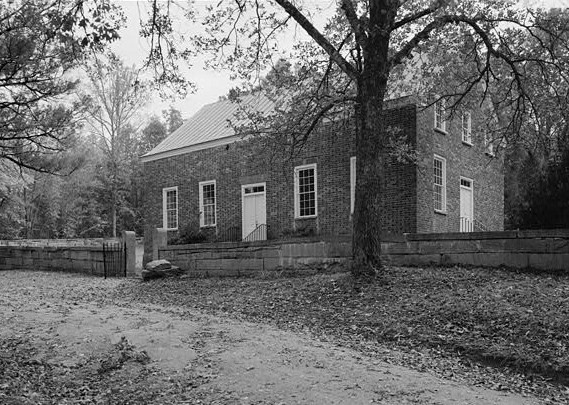
- Ebenezer Associate Reformed Presbyterian Church (Old Brick Church)

- Location within South Carolina Location within the United States
- Nearest city: Jenkinsville, South Carolina
- Coordinates: 34°19′9″N 81°15′39″W
- Built: 1788
- NRHP reference No.: 71000775
- Added to NRHP: August 19, 1971

Old Brick Church, which is also known as Ebenezer Associate Reformed Presbyterian (ARP) Church or First Associate Reformed Presbyterian Church is a church built in 1788 about 4 mi (6 km) north of Jenkinsville on SC 213 in Fairfield County, South Carolina, United States. It was named to the National Register of Historic Places on August 19, 1971. It is one of the few 18th-century churches surviving in the South Carolina midlands.

== History ==
In the 1770s, Presbyterian settlers from Scotland and Ireland built a log church. This was replaced by a brick church on the Little River in 1788. This church is a simple, rectangular, brick building with a gabled roof. The bricks were handmade by members of the congregation. The church has straight-back, wooden pews. There is a dais pulpit against the east wall that is three steps above floor level. The dais has a bible stand and has rails on the two sides. On the west end, there is a slave gallery. In 1852, a stone wall was built around the church and cemetery.

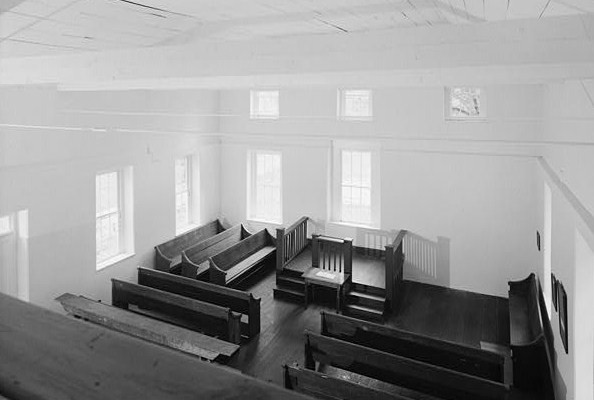
Interior of Old Brick Church from the slave gallery

Pastors of the church include James Rogers (1791–1830), James Boyce (1832–1843), Thomas Ketchin (1844–1852), C.B. Betts (1855–1869), Allen Grier Kirkpatrick (1896–1899).

On May 9, 1803, the church was used for a meeting of ministers and church elders that resulted in the formation of the Associate Reformed Synod of the Carolinas. Although not the first Associate Reformed Church in South Carolina, Old Brick Church is considered the "mother church" or "birthplace" of the ARP Church in South Carolina.

The church grew in the period of before the Civil War. During the war, Union Army soldiers used part of the floor to reconstruct a bridge over the Little River. There is a pencilled apology on an interior wall that was left by soldier "Citizens of this community: Please excuse us for defacing your house of worship, so much. It was absolutely necessary to effect a crossing over the creek, the Rebs had destroyed the bridge. A Yankee."

After the war, the church congregation shrank. After Rev. Betts resigned in 1869, the church had infrequent supply pastors, but it eventually disappeared from the Presbytery rolls. In the 1891, the church was revived by Rev. A. G. Kirkpatrick, who was pastor in another church. In 1893, it was reorganized on August 25, 1893. In 1896, Kirkpatrick became its pastor.

In the 1920s, the congregation moved to a new building. Old Brick Church is used for special services. Although it does not have an active congregation, the Catawba Presbytery of the Associate Reformed Presbyterian Church put Old Brick Church back on the rolls as a house of worship in 1973. In 2007, the Old Brick Church Commission was appointed to care for the church and its cemetery.

== Historical Marker ==
The site was made a historical marker in 1962 by Fairfield County Chamber of Commerce. The historical marker is located near Jenkinsville Fairfield County South Carolina on Monticello Road. The historical marker sets a point in history where religion was brought to the area and represents an important place during the American Civil War. The marker is also a record of time which the rock wall was added in 1852
