= Fairfield County, South Carolina =

County in South Carolina, United States

- County
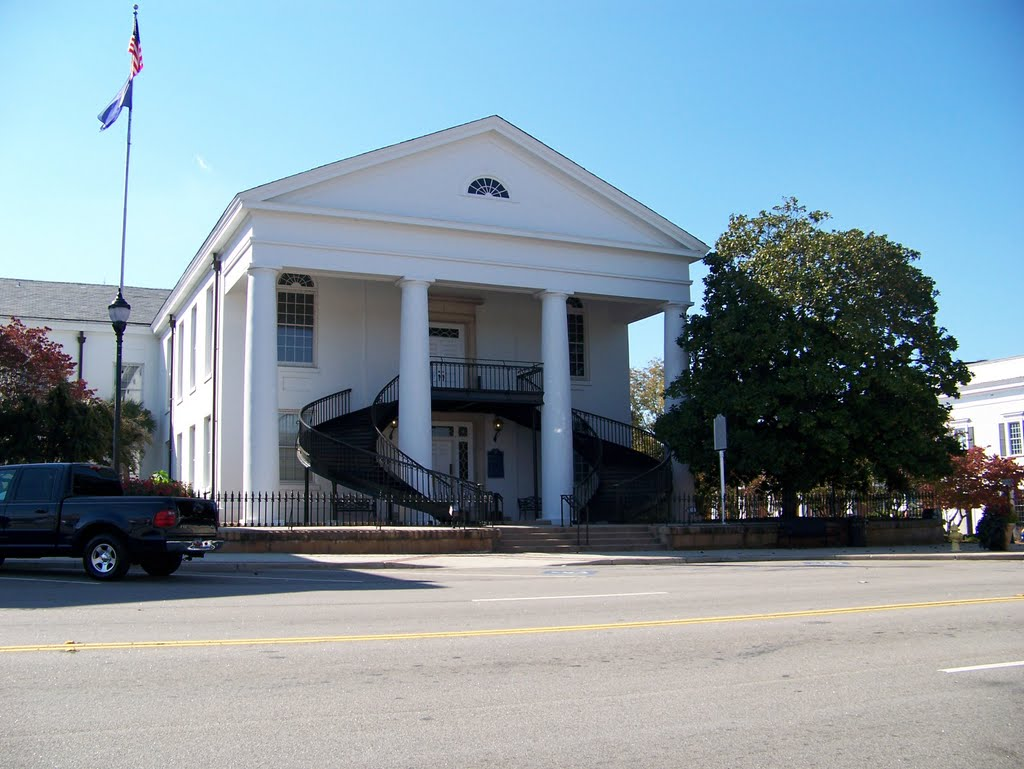
- Fairfield County Courthouse

- Seal
- Motto(s): "Capital Convenience, Country Comfort"
- Location within the U.S. state of South Carolina
- Interactive map of Fairfield County, South Carolina
- Coordinates: 34.40°N 81.13°W
- Country: United States
- State: South Carolina
- Founded: 1785
- Named for: Comment made by General Cornwallis stating ""How Fair These Fields"
- Seat: Winnsboro
- Largest community: Winnsboro

Area
  - Total: 709.87 sq mi (1,838.6 km^{2})
  - Land: 686.31 sq mi (1,777.5 km^{2})
  - Water: 23.56 sq mi (61.0 km^{2}) 3.32%

Population (2020)
  - Total: 20,948
  - Estimate (2025): 20,340 ▼
  - Density: 30.523/sq mi (11.785/km^{2})
- Time zone: UTC−5 (Eastern)
  - Summer (DST): UTC−4 (EDT)
- Congressional district: 5th
- Website: www.fairfieldsc.com

Fairfield County is a county located in the U.S. state of South Carolina. As of the 2020 census, its population was 20,948. Its county seat is Winnsboro. Fairfield County is part of the Columbia, South Carolina metropolitan area.

== History ==
=== 18th century ===
It is alleged that the county name originated from a statement made by General Cornwallis when he declared "How Fair These Fields" during the British occupation of the area in 1780–81. The house Cornwallis stayed in during the occupation is still standing.

Several years before the Revolution, Richard Winn from Virginia moved to what is now called Fairfield County. His lands covered the present site of Winnsboro, and as early as 1777 the settlement was known as "Winnsborough".

The village was laid out and chartered in 1785 upon petition of Richard Winn, John Winn and John Vanderhorst. John Richard, and Minor Winn all served in the Revolutionary War. Richard was a General and he is said to have fought in more battles than any patriot in South Carolina.

Fairfield County has numerous churches, some of which have existed for over 200 years. Perhaps the most famous church, built in 1788, is the Old Brick Church, where the Associate Reformed Presbyterian Synod of the Carolinas was organized in 1803. A note penciled on the wall of the Old Brick Church is testimony to a Union soldier's regret at the church's floor boards being taken up to build a crossing over the nearby river for General Sherman's troops during the American Civil War.

The early settlers in the mid-18th century brought cotton to the county. It was soon supported as a commodity crop by the labor of enslaved African Americans.

=== 19th century ===
Invention of the cotton gin enabled the cultivation of short-staple cotton through the upcountry regions of the South. It was the chief commodity crop for this county from the early 19th century through the 1920s. In the antebellum era, most of the intensive labor was accomplished by African-American slaves, many of whose descendants still live in this rural area. After the Civil War, many African Americans initially worked as sharecroppers and tenant farmers. Over time the soil became depleted, but more damaging was infestation in the 20th century by the boll weevil. Together with the mechanization of agriculture, the need for labor was reduced. In the first half of the 20th century through the 1940s, millions of African Americans left the rural South in the Great Migration to northern and midwestern cities for other job opportunities and the chance to escape Jim Crow restrictions.

In December 1832, Winnsboro was incorporated as a town to be governed by an intendant and wardens. The most prominent architectural feature of Fairfield County is the Town Clock in Winnsboro. South Carolina's General Assembly authorized Winnsboro's town fathers to build a market house that "shall not be of greater width than 30 feet (9.1 m)" to allow 30 feet (9.1 m) of wagon travel on either side. The narrow building was modeled after Independence Hall in Philadelphia and built on the site of a duck pond. A clock was added in 1837, and the building has since been known as the Town Clock.

The County Courthouse, across from the Town Clock, dates back to 1823. Designed by South Carolina architect Robert Mills, the courthouse houses records dating to the mid-18th century.

==== Reconstruction ====
During Reconstruction, the Fairfield District was changed into Fairfield County and was occupied by Union troops. The South Carolina state constitution of 1868 was such that those who fought for the confederacy were barred from voting in the 1868 elections. As a result, most eligible voters in Fairfield County were African-American. In 1868 there were 942 whites in the county were eligible to vote and 2,434 African-Americans who were eligible to vote. In the election held under these circumstances an African-American man, George Barber, was elected to represent Fairfield County in the South Carolina State Senate. In the same election the county elected three people to the South Carolina state house of representatives. Henry Jacob and Henry Johnson, who were African-Americans and L.W. Duvall who was white. This was considered revolutionary at the time and those who had previously been slave owners were extremely angry. Due to how much social spending the Reconstruction government engaged in, by the end of 1870 Fairfield County was one of only two counties in the state that was not in debt. During the presidential election of 1872, there were three companies of U.S. troops stationed in Fairfield County to prevent the Ku Klux Klan from disrupting voting.

Granite deposits in the County led to the early development of quarrying. Winnsboro blue granite, "The Silk of the Trade," is used worldwide in buildings and monuments.

=== 20th century ===
The county was home to the Carolinas–Virginia Tube Reactor during the 1960s. In 1984 the Virgil C. Summer Nuclear Generating Station was built here. The county owns the Fairfield County Airport, in operation since 1975. The Ridgeway gold mine, east of Ridgeway, was in operation from 1988 to 1999.

== Geography ==
According to the U.S. Census Bureau, the county has a total area of 709.87 square miles (1,838.6 km^{2}), of which 686.31 square miles (1,777.5 km^{2}) is land and 23.56 square miles (61.0 km^{2}) (3.32%) is water. The Enoree Ranger District of the Sumter National Forest provides opportunities for outdoor recreation. The county has an abundance of deer and wild turkeys, making it an attraction for hunters. It is home to the Lake Wateree State Recreation Area.

=== National Protected area ===
- Sumter National Forest (part)

=== State and local protected areas/sites ===
- Lake Monticello Park
- Lake Wateree State Park
- Monticello Recreational Lake Beach
- The South Carolina Railroad Museum
- Upland Wings Preserve

=== Major water bodies ===
- Big Cedar Creek
- Broad River
- Catawba River
- Great Falls Lake
- Lake Wateree
- Little River
- Monticello Reservoir
- Persimmon Creek

=== Adjacent counties ===
- Chester County – north
- Lancaster County – northeast
- Kershaw County – east
- Richland County – south
- Newberry County – southwest
- Union County – northwest

=== Major highways ===
- I-77
- US 21
- US 21 Conn.
- US 321
- US 321 Bus.
- SC 34
- SC 200
- SC 200 Conn.
- SC 213
- SC 215
- SC 269
- SC 901

=== Major infrastructure ===
- Fairfield County Airport

== Demographics ==
Historical population
Census	Pop.	Note	%±
1790	7,623		—
1800	10,087		32.3%
1810	11,857		17.5%
1820	17,174		44.8%
1830	21,546		25.5%
1840	20,165		−6.4%
1850	21,404		6.1%
1860	22,111		3.3%
1870	19,888		−10.1%
1880	27,765		39.6%
1890	28,599		3.0%
1900	29,425		2.9%
1910	29,442		0.1%
1920	27,159		−7.8%
1930	23,287		−14.3%
1940	24,187		3.9%
1950	21,780		−10.0%
1960	20,713		−4.9%
1970	19,999		−3.4%
1980	20,700		3.5%
1990	22,295		7.7%
2000	23,454		5.2%
2010	23,956		2.1%
2020	20,948		−12.6%
2025 (est.)	20,340	▼	−2.9%
U.S. Decennial Census; 1790–1960 1900–1990; 1990–2000 2010 2020

=== Racial and ethnic composition ===
Fairfield County, South Carolina – Racial and ethnic composition Note: the US Census treats Hispanic/Latino as an ethnic category. This table excludes Latinos from the racial categories and assigns them to a separate category. Hispanics/Latinos may be of any race.
Race / Ethnicity (NH = Non-Hispanic)	Pop 1980	Pop 1990	Pop 2000	Pop 2010	Pop 2020	% 1980	% 1990	% 2000	% 2010	% 2020
White alone (NH)	8,566	9,200	9,195	9,098	8,503	41.38%	41.26%	39.20%	37.98%	40.59%
Black or African American alone (NH)	11,918	12,948	13,810	14,112	11,201	57.57%	58.08%	58.88%	58.91%	53.47%
Native American or Alaska Native alone (NH)	9	14	35	47	64	0.04%	0.06%	0.15%	0.20%	0.31%
Asian alone (NH)	9	28	41	54	101	0.04%	0.13%	0.17%	0.23%	0.48%
Native Hawaiian or Pacific Islander alone (NH)	x	x	0	0	7	x	x	0.00%	0.00%	0.03%
Other race alone (NH)	9	0	9	30	55	0.04%	0.00%	0.04%	0.13%	0.26%
Mixed race or Multiracial (NH)	x	x	114	241	594	x	x	0.49%	1.01%	2.84%
Hispanic or Latino (any race)	189	105	250	374	423	0.91%	0.47%	1.07%	1.56%	2.02%
Total	20,700	22,295	23,454	23,956	20,948	100.00%	100.00%	100.00%	100.00%	100.00%

=== 2020 census ===
As of the 2020 census, there were 20,948 people and 5,921 families residing in the county. The median age was 50.2 years. 17.4% of residents were under the age of 18 and 24.4% of residents were 65 years of age or older. For every 100 females there were 91.7 males, and for every 100 females age 18 and over there were 89.6 males age 18 and over.

The racial makeup of the county was 40.9% White, 53.7% Black or African American, 0.4% American Indian and Alaska Native, 0.5% Asian, 0.0% Native Hawaiian and Pacific Islander, 1.1% from some other race, and 3.4% from two or more races. Hispanic or Latino residents of any race comprised 2.0% of the population.

22.7% of residents lived in urban areas, while 77.3% lived in rural areas.

There were 9,157 households in the county, of which 23.4% had children under the age of 18 living with them and 34.6% had a female householder with no spouse or partner present. About 32.1% of all households were made up of individuals and 14.6% had someone living alone who was 65 years of age or older.

There were 10,838 housing units, of which 15.5% were vacant. Among occupied housing units, 74.0% were owner-occupied and 26.0% were renter-occupied. The homeowner vacancy rate was 1.0% and the rental vacancy rate was 5.9%.

=== 2010 census ===
At the 2010 census, there were 23,956 people, 9,419 households, and 6,578 families living in the county. The population density was 34.9 inhabitants per square mile (13.5 inhabitants/km^{2}). There were 11,681 housing units at an average density of 17.0 units per square mile (6.6 units/km^{2}). The racial makeup of the county was 59.1% black or African American, 38.6% white, 0.2% Asian, 0.2% American Indian, 0.8% from other races, and 1.1% from two or more races. Those of Hispanic or Latino origin made up 1.6% of the population. In terms of ancestry, 18.0% were American, 6.0% were English, 5.4% were Irish, 5.3% were Subsaharan African, and 5.0% were German.

Of the 9,419 households, 32.5% had children under the age of 18 living with them, 42.8% were married couples living together, 21.3% had a female householder with no husband present, 30.2% were non-families, and 26.5% of all households were made up of individuals. The average household size was 2.50 and the average family size was 3.01. The median age was 42.4 years.

The median income for a household in the county was $32,022 and the median income for a family was $40,849. Males had a median income of $39,837 versus $28,695 for females. The per capita income for the county was $18,877. About 15.8% of families and 22.7% of the population were below the poverty line, including 29.7% of those under age 18 and 20.7% of those age 65 or over.

=== 2000 census ===
At the 2000 census, there were 23,454 people, 8,774 households, and 6,387 families living in the county. The population density was 34 people per square mile (13 people/km^{2}). There were 10,383 housing units at an average density of 15 units per square mile (5.8 units/km^{2}). The racial makeup of the county was 59.09% Black or African American, 39.58% White, 0.19% Asian, 0.15% Native American, 0.44% from other races, and 0.55% from two or more races. 1.07% of the population were Hispanic or Latino of any race.

There were 8,774 households, out of which 32.40% had children under the age of 18 living with them, 47.90% were married couples living together, 20.00% had a female householder with no husband present, and 27.20% were non-families. 24.40% of all households were made up of individuals, and 9.40% had someone living alone who was 65 years of age or older. The average household size was 2.63 and the average family size was 3.12.

In the county, the population was spread out, with 26.10% under the age of 18, 8.60% from 18 to 24, 27.80% from 25 to 44, 24.30% from 45 to 64, and 13.20% who were 65 years of age or older. The median age was 37 years. For every 100 females, there were 90.90 males. For every 100 females age 18 and over, there were 88.80 males.

The median income for a household in the county was $30,376, and the median income for a family was $35,943. Males had a median income of $29,033 versus $21,197 for females. The per capita income for the county was $14,911. About 17.20% of families and 19.60% of the population were below the poverty line, including 24.70% of those under age 18 and 24.10% of those age 65 or over.

== Government and politics ==
Fairfield County is a Democratic stronghold, like most majority African American counties in the United States. The last Republican to carry the county was Richard Nixon in 1972, who did so by only 2 percentage points. From 1988 until 2024, no Republican managed to reach 40% of the county's vote; Democratic support was especially strong in the county in the Obama era. The Democratic margin of victory has decreased since then, however.

=== County Council ===
- Moses W. Bell - District 1, Chairman
- Shirley M. Greene - District 2, Vice Chair
- Mikel Trapp - District 3
- Timothy Roseborough - District 4
- Douglas Pauley - District 5
- Cornelius Robinson - District 6
- Clarence Gilbert - District 7

=== County Administrator ===
- Vic Carpenter

United States presidential election results for Fairfield County, South Carolina
Year	Republican		Democratic		Third party(ies)	
Year	No.	%	No.	%	No.	%
1900	17	2.47%	670	97.53%	0	0.00%
1904	0	0.00%	723	100.00%	0	0.00%
1912	3	0.47%	622	98.26%	8	1.26%
1916	0	0.00%	726	98.37%	12	1.63%
1920	15	1.99%	737	98.01%	0	0.00%
1924	11	1.71%	631	97.98%	2	0.31%
1928	94	10.74%	781	89.26%	0	0.00%
1932	10	1.09%	901	98.58%	3	0.33%
1936	13	1.28%	1,005	98.72%	0	0.00%
1940	20	2.30%	848	97.70%	0	0.00%
1944	21	2.43%	798	92.47%	44	5.10%
1948	63	4.67%	211	15.64%	1,075	79.69%
1952	1,607	50.27%	1,590	49.73%	0	0.00%
1956	519	19.60%	961	36.29%	1,168	44.11%
1960	1,549	48.68%	1,633	51.32%	0	0.00%
1964	1,997	43.18%	2,628	56.82%	0	0.00%
1968	1,619	27.14%	3,011	50.47%	1,336	22.39%
1972	2,608	50.68%	2,492	48.43%	46	0.89%
1976	1,817	30.34%	4,153	69.36%	18	0.30%
1980	2,098	33.18%	4,153	65.68%	72	1.14%
1984	3,147	43.19%	4,117	56.50%	23	0.32%
1988	2,714	41.23%	3,827	58.13%	42	0.64%
1992	2,518	31.12%	4,867	60.15%	706	8.73%
1996	2,414	32.29%	4,719	63.12%	343	4.59%
2000	3,011	35.85%	5,263	62.67%	124	1.48%
2004	3,531	37.42%	5,764	61.09%	140	1.48%
2008	3,912	33.67%	7,591	65.33%	116	1.00%
2012	3,999	33.62%	7,777	65.38%	119	1.00%
2016	4,027	35.74%	6,945	61.64%	295	2.62%
2020	4,625	38.11%	7,382	60.83%	129	1.06%
2024	4,792	42.73%	6,277	55.97%	146	1.30%

== Economy ==
In 2022, the GDP of Fairfield County was $1.4 billion (about $67,980 per capita). In chained 2017 dollars, the real GDP was $1.1 billion (about $54,254 per capita). Between 2022-2024, the unemployment rate has fluctuated between 2.9-5.7%.

Some of the largest employers in the county include BOMAG, Dominion Energy, Element Electronics, Food Lion, the town of Winnsboro, and Universal Protection Service.

Employment and Wage Statistics by Industry in Fairfield County, South Carolina
Industry	Employment Counts	Employment Percentage (%)	Average Annual Wage ($)
Accommodation and Food Services	248	5.5	15,548
Administrative and Support and Waste Management and Remediation Services	290	6.4	53,196
Agriculture, Forestry, Fishing and Hunting	25	0.6	54,652
Construction	139	3.1	54,704
Finance and Insurance	108	2.4	80,340
Health Care and Social Assistance	597	13.2	38,376
Information	27	0.6	44,824
Manufacturing	1,075	23.7	49,712
Other Services (except Public Administration)	72	1.6	48,048
Professional, Scientific, and Technical Services	322	7.1	52,000
Public Administration	578	12.7	43,888
Real Estate and Rental and Leasing	4	0.1	53,612
Retail Trade	511	11.3	27,768
Transportation and Warehousing	65	1.4	55,432
Wholesale Trade	475	10.5	77,428
Total	4,536	100.0%	47,365

== Crime ==
Fairfield County's violent crime rate is 629, as compared to the South Carolina average of 521 and the top performing states at 62. The measure is the number of violent crimes reported per 100,000 population. Violent crimes are defined as offenses that involve a face-to-face confrontation between the victim and the perpetrator, including homicide, rape, robbery, and aggravated assault. According to CrimeGrade.org, Fairfield County is listed as D+ on an A-F grading scale. This means that the rate of crime is higher than the average US county. Fairfield County is in the 29th percentile for safety, meaning 71% of counties are safer and 29% of counties are more dangerous.

== Poverty ==
Based on the Fairfield County Community Health Needs Assessment Report conducted in March 2018, the median household income for Fairfield County is $36,004 which is considerably lower than the state median at $46,898. Of the county's 22,653 residents, 23% live in poverty. Fairfield County's rate of Children in Poverty is 32%, which is greater than the South Carolina average of 23% and far exceeds the top performing states at 12%.

== Communities ==
=== Towns ===
- Blythewood (Mostly in Richland County)
- Jenkinsville
- Ridgeway
- Winnsboro (county seat and largest community)

=== Census-designated place ===
- Winnsboro Mills

=== Unincorporated communities ===
- Adger
- Blackjack
- Blackstock
- Blair
- Bucklick
- Feasterville
- Greenbrier
- Longtown
- Mitford
- Monticello
- Rion
- Lebanon

== See also ==
- List of counties in South Carolina
- National Register of Historic Places listings in Fairfield County, South Carolina
