= Davis House =

Davis House may refer to:

== In Canada ==
- George Davis House (Toronto)

== In the United States ==
- Attoway R. Davis Home, Eutaw, Alabama
- Mary Lee Davis House, Fairbanks, Alaska
- J. M. Davis House, Juneau, Alaska
- William Charles Davis House, Safford, Arizona, NRHP-listed in Graham County
- Davis House (Clarksville, Arkansas)
- Davis House (Norfork, Arkansas)
- Davis Barn (Pleasant Grove, Arkansas)
- Scott-Davis House, Romance, Arkansas
- M. E. Davis House, Dermott, Arkansas
- Davis-Adams House, Warren, Arkansas
- Davis House, a University Students' Cooperative Association house in Berkeley, California
- Thomas Davis House (Kenton, Delaware)
- Robert Davis Farmhouse, Millsboro, Delaware
- Waite-Davis House, Apopka, Florida
- Joshua Davis House (Mt. Pleasant, Florida)
- John A. Davis House, Albany, Georgia
- Josiah Davis House, Canoochee, Georgia
- Daniel M. Davis House, Dahlonega, Georgia
- Pyle-Davis House, Demorest, Georgia, NRHP-listed in Habersham County
- Strong-Davis-Rice-George House, Eatonton, Georgia, NRHP-listed in Putnam County
- Davis-Felton Plantation, Henderson, Georgia
- Davis-Guttenberger-Rankin House, Macon, Georgia, NRHP-listed in Bibb County
- Davis-Edwards House, Monroe, Georgia, NRHP-listed in Walton County
- Walters-Davis House, Toccoa, Georgia
- Davis-Proctor House, Twin City, Georgia
- R. K. Davis House, Boise, Idaho
- E. F. Davis House, Paris, Idaho, NRHP-listed in Bear Lake County
- David Davis III & IV House, Bloomington, Illinois
- Timothy Davis House, Elkader, Iowa
- Howell J. Davis House, Owensboro, Kentucky, NRHP-listed in Kentucky
- Daniel Davis House (Paintsville, Kentucky), NRHP-listed in Johnson County
- E. M. Davis Farm, Shelbyville, Kentucky, NRHP-listed in Shelby County
- Kidd-Davis House, Ruston, Louisiana
- John Davis House (Chelsea, Maine)
- Davis-Warner House, Takoma Park, Maryland
- Holt-Cummings-Davis House, Andover, Massachusetts
- Robert S. Davis House, Brookline, Massachusetts
- Thomas Aspinwall Davis House, Brookline, Massachusetts
- William Morris Davis House, Cambridge, Massachusetts
- Davis-Freeman House, Gloucester, Massachusetts
- Ephraim Davis House, Haverhill, Massachusetts
- Brown-Davis-Frost Farm, Jefferson, Massachusetts
- Seth Davis House, Newton, Massachusetts
- Dr. Frank Davis House, Quincy, Massachusetts
- Rodney Davis Three-Decker, Worcester, Massachusetts
- Isaac Davis House, Worcester, Massachusetts
- Wesley Davis Three-Decker, Worcester, Massachusetts
- Joseph Davis House, Worcester, Massachusetts
- Davis Carriage House, Saginaw, Michigan
- E. C. Davis House, Crookston, Minnesota, NRHP-listed in Minnesota
- Reuben Davis House, Aberdeen, Mississippi
- Davis House (Enterprise, Mississippi), NRHP-listed in Mississippi
- James S. Davis House, Iuka, Mississippi, NRHP-listed in Mississippi
- Davis-Mitchell House, Vicksburg, Mississippi, NRHP-listed in Mississippi
- Davis House (Albuquerque, New Mexico)
- Davis Town Meeting House, Coram, New York
- Charles Homer Davis House, Lloyd Harbor, New York
- Phineas Davis Farmstead, Mexico, New York
- Lasher-Davis House, Nelliston, New York
- Davis Stone House, Rochester, New York
- Davis Family House, Crabtree, North Carolina
- John Davis House (Fayetteville, North Carolina)
- Archibald H. Davis Plantation, Justice, North Carolina
- McClelland-Davis House, Statesville, North Carolina
- Davis-Whitehead-Harriss House, Wilson, North Carolina
- Davis-Adcock Store, Wilbon, North Carolina
- Samuel Davis House (Mifflin Township, Franklin County, Ohio), in the Columbus, Ohio area
- Alexander Davis Cabin, Dublin, Ohio, NRHP-listed in Franklin County, Ohio
- Alexander Davis House, Dublin, Ohio, NRHP-listed in Franklin County, Ohio
- Anson Davis House, Dublin, Ohio
- Anson Davis Springhouse, Dublin, Ohio
- James Davis Farm, Dublin, Ohio, NRHP-listed in Franklin County, Ohio
- James Davis Barn, Dublin, Ohio, NRHP-listed in Franklin County, Ohio
- Samuel Henry Davis House, Dublin, Ohio, NRHP-listed in Franklin County, Ohio
- Smith-Davis House, Lebanon, Ohio, NRHP-listed in Ohio
- John and Magdalena Davis Farm, Oregon City, Oregon, NRHP-listed in Clackamas County, Oregon
- Daniel Davis House and Barn, Birmingham, Pennsylvania
- David Davis Farm, New Holland, Pennsylvania
- Winnie Davis Hall, Gaffney, South Carolina
- Davis House (Manning, South Carolina)
- Davis Plantation (Monticello, South Carolina)
- Amy A. Davis House, Watertown, South Dakota, NRHP-listed in South Dakota
- Davis-Hull House, Carthage, Tennessee
- Stokely Davis House, Franklin, Tennessee
- Sam Davis House (Smyrna, Tennessee)
- James R. Davis House, Walland, Tennessee, NRHP-listed in Tennessee
- George R. Davis House, Abilene, Texas, NRHP-listed in Taylor County, Texas
- George W. Davis House, Bastrop, Texas, NRHP-listed in Bastrop County, Texas
- William and Anna Davis House, Gainesville, Texas, NRHP-listed in Texas
- Davis-Hill House, McKinney, Texas, NRHP-listed in Texas
- H. L. Davis House, McKinney, Texas, NRHP-listed in Texas
- Davis House (Salado, Texas), NRHP-listed in Texas
- Ben and Mary Davis House, Wharton, Texas, NRHP-listed in Texas
- David E. House, Rush Valley, Utah, NRHP-listed in Utah
- Joshua Davis House (Orem, Utah)
- Davis-Ercanbrack Farmstead, Orem, Utah
- Parley Davis House, East Montpelier, Vermont
- Milldean and Alexander-Davis House, Grafton, Vermont
- Davis-Beard House, Bristow, Virginia
- Decatur O. Davis House, Richmond, Virginia
- Codman-Davis House, Washington, D.C.
- Cyrus Davis Farmstead, Menomonee Falls, Wisconsin, NRHP-listed in Waukesha County, Wisconsin
- Cyrus Davis-Davis Brothers Farmhouse, Menomonee Falls, Wisconsin, NRHP-listed in Waukesha County, Wisconsin
- H. R. Davis House, Wauwatosa, Wisconsin, NRHP-listed in Wisconsin

== See also ==
- Davis Plantation (disambiguation)
- Davis Farm (disambiguation) covering Davis Barn, Davis Farmstead and variations
- Daniel Davis House (disambiguation)
- George Davis House (disambiguation)
- John Davis House (disambiguation)
- Joshua Davis House (disambiguation)
- Robert Davis House (disambiguation)
- Samuel Davis House (disambiguation)
- Thomas Davis House (disambiguation)
- William Davis House (disambiguation)
