= Davis Farm =

Davis Farm or Davis Farmstead or Davis Barn may refer to:

in the United States (by state)

- Davis Barn (Pleasant Grove, Arkansas), listed on the NRHP in Stone County, Arkansas
- Robert Davis Farmhouse, Millsboro, Delaware, listed on the NRHP in Sussex County, Delaware
- E. M. Davis Farm, Shelbyville, Kentucky, listed on the NRHP in Shelby County, Kentucky
- Brown-Davis-Frost Farm, Jefferson, Massachusetts, listed on the NRHP in Worcester County, Massachusetts
- Phineas Davis Farmstead, Mexico, New York, listed on the NRHP in Oswego County, New York
- James Davis Farm, Dublin, Ohio, listed on the NRHP in Franklin County, Ohio
- James Davis Barn, Dublin, Ohio, listed on the NRHP in Franklin County, Ohio
- John and Magdalena Davis Farm, Oregon City, Oregon, listed on the NRHP in Clackamas County, Oregon
- Daniel Davis House and Barn, Birmingham, Pennsylvania, listed on the NRHP in southern Chester County, Pennsylvania
- David Davis Farm, New Holland, Pennsylvania, listed on the NRHP in Lancaster County, Pennsylvania
- Davis-Ercanbrack Farmstead, Orem, Utah, listed on the NRHP in Utah County, Utah
- Cyrus Davis Farmstead, Menomonee Falls, Wisconsin, listed on the NRHP in Waukesha County, Wisconsin
- Cyrus Davis-Davis Brothers Farmhouse, Menomonee Falls, Wisconsin, listed on the NRHP in Waukesha County, Wisconsin

== See also ==
- Davis House (disambiguation)
