= John Davis House =

John Davis House may refer to:

- John A. Davis House, Albany, Georgia, listed on the NRHP in Dougherty County, Georgia
- John Davis House (Chelsea, Maine), listed on the NRHP in Kennebec County, Maine
- John Davis House (Fayetteville, North Carolina), listed on the NRHP in Cumberland County, North Carolina
- John and Magdalena Davis Farm, Oregon City, Oregon, listed on the NRHP in Clackamas County, Oregon

== See also ==
- Davis House (disambiguation)
