= Daniel Davis House =

Daniel Davis House may refer to:

- Daniel M. Davis House, Dahlonega, Georgia, listed on the NRHP in Lumpkin County, Georgia
- Daniel Davis House (Paintsville, Kentucky), listed on the NRHP in Johnson County, Kentucky
- Daniel Davis House and Barn, Birmingham, Pennsylvania, listed on the NRHP in southern Chester County, Pennsylvania

== See also ==
- Davis House (disambiguation)
