= Joshua Davis House =

Joshua Davis House may refer to:

- Joshua Davis House (Mt. Pleasant, Florida), listed on the National Register of Historic Places (NRHP)
- Joshua Davis House (Orem, Utah), also NRHP-listed

== See also ==
- Davis House (disambiguation)
- Joshua Davis (disambiguation)
