= Davis Plantation =

Davis Plantation may refer to:

- Davis-Felton Plantation, Henderson, Georgia, listed on the NRHP in Houston County, Georgia
- Archibald H. Davis Plantation, Justice, North Carolina, listed on the NRHP in Franklin County, North Carolina
- Davis Plantation (Monticello, South Carolina), listed on the NRHP in Fairfield County, South Carolina
