= George Davis House =

George Davis House may refer to:

in Canada

- George Davis House (Toronto)

in the United States

- George R. Davis House, Abilene, Texas, listed on the NRHP in Taylor County, Texas
- George W. Davis House, Bastrop, Texas, listed on the NRHP in Bastrop County, Texas

== See also ==
- Davis House (disambiguation)
