= Samuel Davis House =

Samuel Davis House or Sam Davis House may refer to:

- Samuel Davis House (Norwich Township, Franklin County, Ohio), listed on the NRHP in Franklin County, Ohio, in the Columbus, Ohio area
- Samuel Henry Davis House, Dublin, Ohio, listed on the NRHP in Franklin County, Ohio
- Sam Davis House (Smyrna, Tennessee), listed on the NRHP in Rutherford County, Tennessee

== See also ==
- Davis House (disambiguation)
