= Robert Davis House =

Robert Davis House may refer to:

in the United States

- Robert Davis Farmhouse, Millsboro, Delaware, listed on the NRHP in Sussex County, Delaware
- Robert S. Davis House, Brookline, Massachusetts, listed on the NRHP in Norfolk County, Massachusetts

== See also ==
- Davis House (disambiguation)
