= Thomas Davis House =

Thomas Davis House may refer to:

- Thomas Davis House (Kenton, Delaware), listed on the NRHP in Kent County, Delaware
- Thomas Aspinwall Davis House, Brookline, Massachusetts, listed on the NRHP in Norfolk County, Massachusetts

== See also ==
- Davis House (disambiguation)
