= Justice, North Carolina =

Unincorporated community in North Carolina, US

Coordinates: 36°03′31″N 78°10′14″W

Justice is an unincorporated community in eastern Franklin County, North Carolina, United States.

It is located east-southeast of Louisburg, at an elevation of 364 feet (111 m).

The Archibald H. Davis Plantation was listed on the National Register of Historic Places in 1975.
