= William Davis House =

William Davis House may refer to:

- William Charles Davis House, Safford, Arizona, listed on the NRHP in Graham County, Arizona
- William Morris Davis House, Cambridge, Massachusetts, listed on the NRHP in Middlesex County, Massachusetts
- William and Anna Davis House, Gainesville, Texas, listed on the NRHP in Cooke County, Texas

== See also ==
- Davis House (disambiguation)
