= Joshua Davis =

Joshua Davis may refer to:

- Joshua Davis (designer) (born 1971), American web designer and founder of Praystation.com
- Josh Davis (swimmer) (born 1972), American Olympic gold medalist swimmer
- DJ Shadow (born 1972), disc jockey whose birth name is Joshua Davis
- Joshua Davis (writer) (born 1974), American author and journalist
- Josh Davis (American football) (born 1980), American football wide receiver for the Carolina Panthers
- Josh Davis (basketball, born 1980), American professional basketball player
- Josh Davis (basketball, born 1991), American professional basketball player

== See also ==
- Joshua Davis House (disambiguation)
