= Willard-Fisk House =

Historic house in Massachusetts, United States

- U.S. National Register of Historic Places
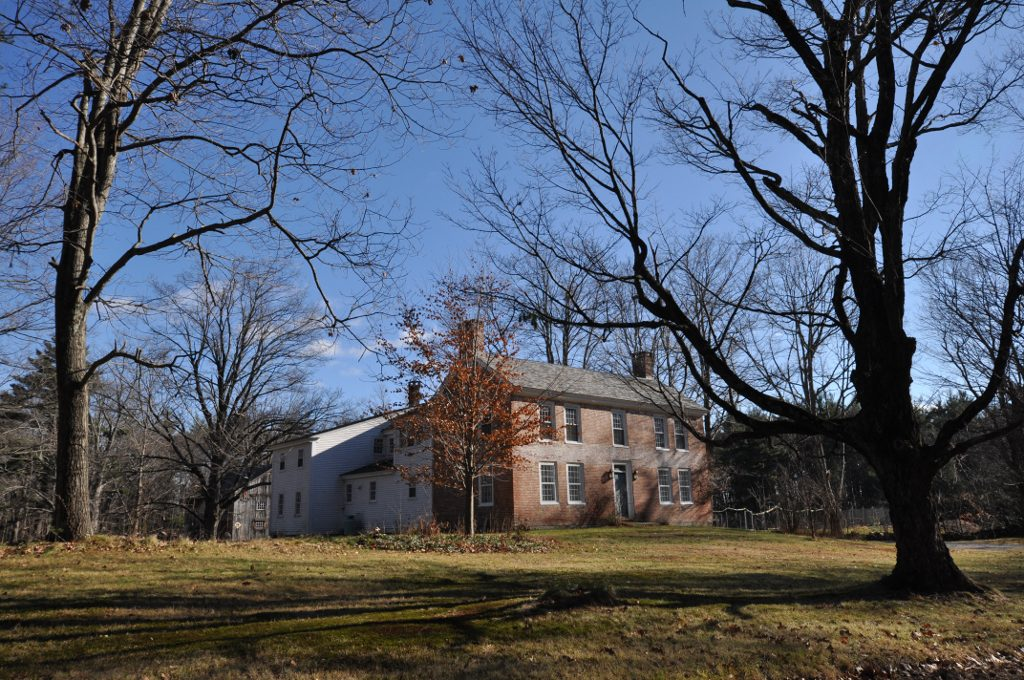

- Location within Massachusetts Location within the United States
- Location: Holden, Massachusetts
- Coordinates: 42°22′44″N 71°53′11″W
- Area: 5.25 acres (2.12 ha)
- Built: 1772
- Architectural style: Georgian; Federal
- NRHP reference No.: 96000163
- Added to NRHP: February 23, 1996

The Willard-Fisk House is a historic farm property at 126 Whitney Street in Holden, Massachusetts. The farmhouse, built about 1772, is one of the oldest houses in Holden, and one of its oldest brick houses. The property also includes a 19th-century barn and several 20th-century farm outbuildings. The property was listed on the National Register of Historic Places in 1996, where it is listed at 121 Whitney Street.

== Description and history ==
The Willard-Fisk House is set in rural northwestern Holden, on the east side of Whitney Street. It is set on about 5 acres (2.0 ha) of former farmland. It is a 2 1/2-story building, with brick front and side walls, end chimneys, and a clapboarded rear wall. Its west-facing front facade is five bays wide, symmetrically arranged, with a center entrance whose only significant ornamentation is a four-light transom window. A 2 1/2-story wood-frame ell extends to the rear of the house. The property also includes a 19th-century barn, and 20th-century chicken house, wood shed, and well house. The property is lined with typical New England fieldstone walls.

The house was built c. 1772 by Daniel Willard on more than 100 acres (40 ha) of land he purchased in that year. It is one of two 18th-century houses on Whitney Street (the other is the Brown-Davis-Frost Farm house), both of which are the earliest known examples of brick architecture in the town. Brick was rarely used in the area during the 18th century; most of Holden's brick architecture dates to the 19th century and later. Willard's widow sold the house in 1777 to David Fisk, a Continental Army soldier during the American Revolutionary War.

== See also ==
- National Register of Historic Places listings in Worcester County, Massachusetts
