= Ephraim Davis House =

Historic house in Massachusetts, United States

- U.S. National Register of Historic Places
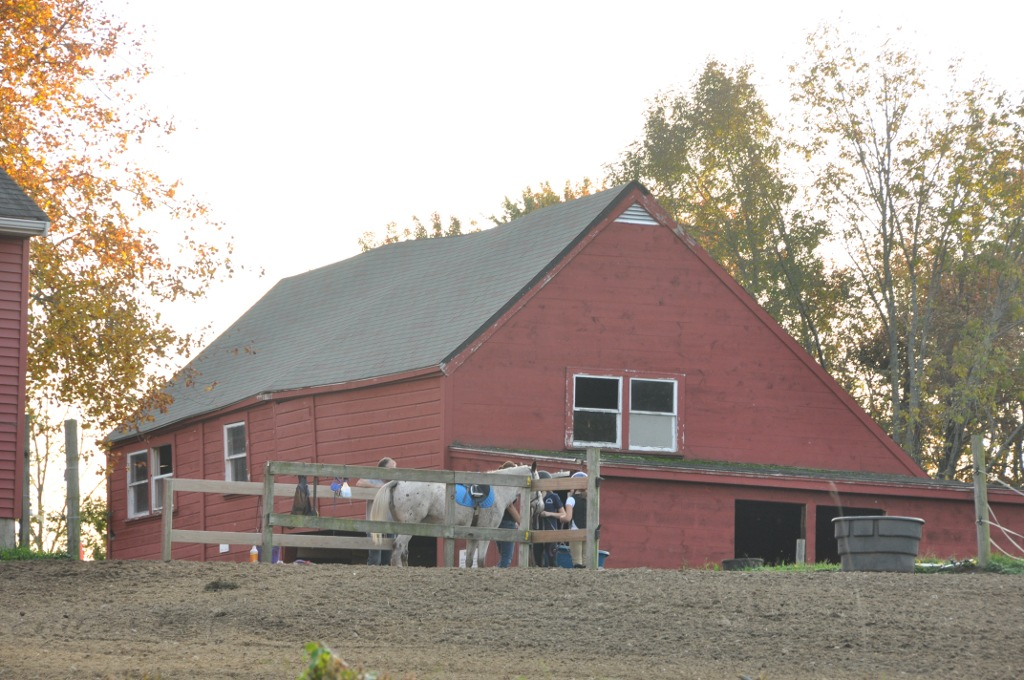

- Location within Massachusetts Location within the United States
- Location: Haverhill, Massachusetts
- Coordinates: 42°48′45″N 71°0′33″W
- Built: 1705
- Architectural style: Colonial
- MPS: First Period Buildings of Eastern Massachusetts TR
- NRHP reference No.: 90000228
- Added to NRHP: March 9, 1990

The Ephraim Davis House is a historic First Period house on Merrimack Road, north of the junction with Amesbury Line Road in Haverhill, Massachusetts. It is now an outbuilding of a farm, functioning as a garage and storage space. The first part of the 2 1/2-story house was built in 1705 by Ephraim Davis, who married in that year. This consisted of a central chimney and rooms to its right; rooms to the left of the chimney, and a leanto section in the back, were added later in the 18th century. The house remained in the hands of Davis descendants into the late 19th century. The house has been unoccupied since 1929, and has seen a variety of farm-related uses since then. Its surviving First Period elements of note are its oak timber frame and central chimney, although it is possible the chimney is a later 18th century rebuilding.

The house was listed on the National Register of Historic Places in 1990.

== See also ==
- National Register of Historic Places listings in Essex County, Massachusetts
