= Charles Homer Davis House =

Historic house in New York, United States

- U.S. National Register of Historic Places
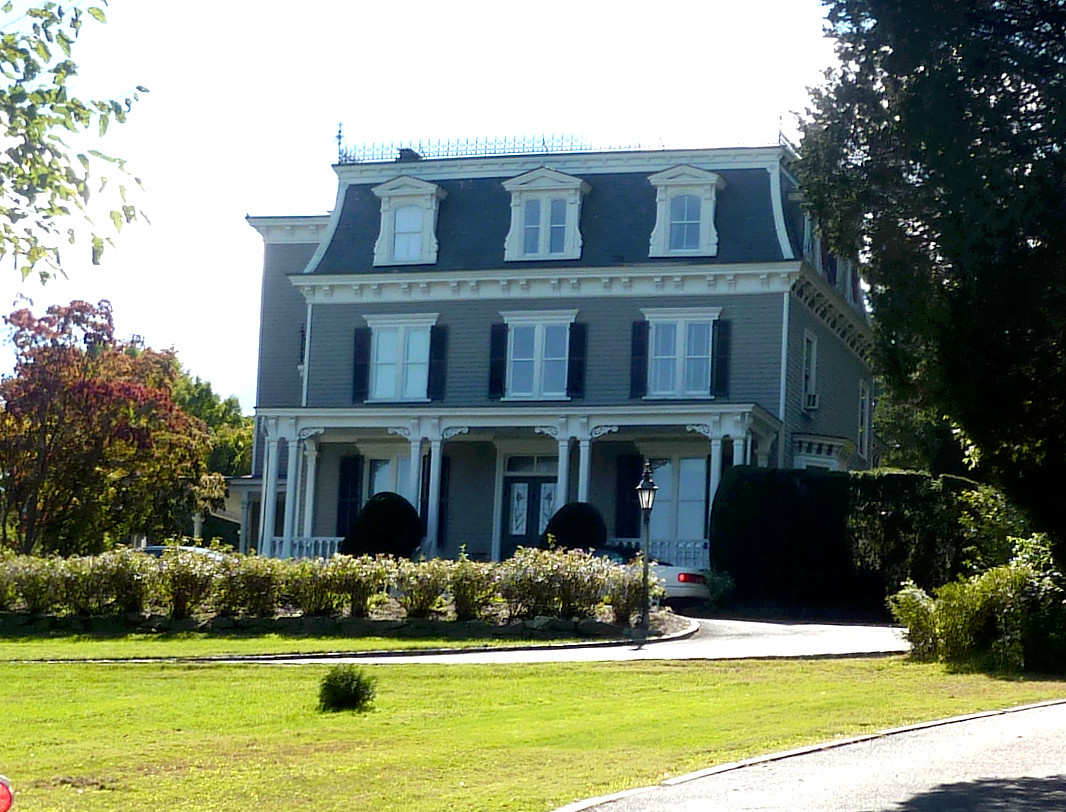

- Location within New York Location within the United States
- Location: 381 W. Neck Rd., Lloyd Harbor, New York
- Coordinates: 40°53′37″N 73°27′18″W
- Area: 2.1 acres (0.85 ha)
- Built: 1869
- Architect: Davis, Charles Homer
- Architectural style: Second Empire
- NRHP reference No.: 06000057
- Added to NRHP: February 22, 2006

The Charles Homer Davis House is a historic house located at 381 West Neck Road in Lloyd Harbor, Suffolk County, New York.

Once owned by pop star Taylor Dayne (Dayne of Thrones)

== Description and history ==
Built in 1869 and designed by Charles Homer Davis, it is a clapboard-sided, three-bay wide, double-pile, 2 1/2-story Second Empire–style house. It features a truncated tower on its south side, a porch that spans the ground floor on the front side and a mansard roof.

It was added to the National Register of Historic Places on February 22, 2006.
