= Rodney Davis Three-Decker =

- U.S. National Register of Historic Places
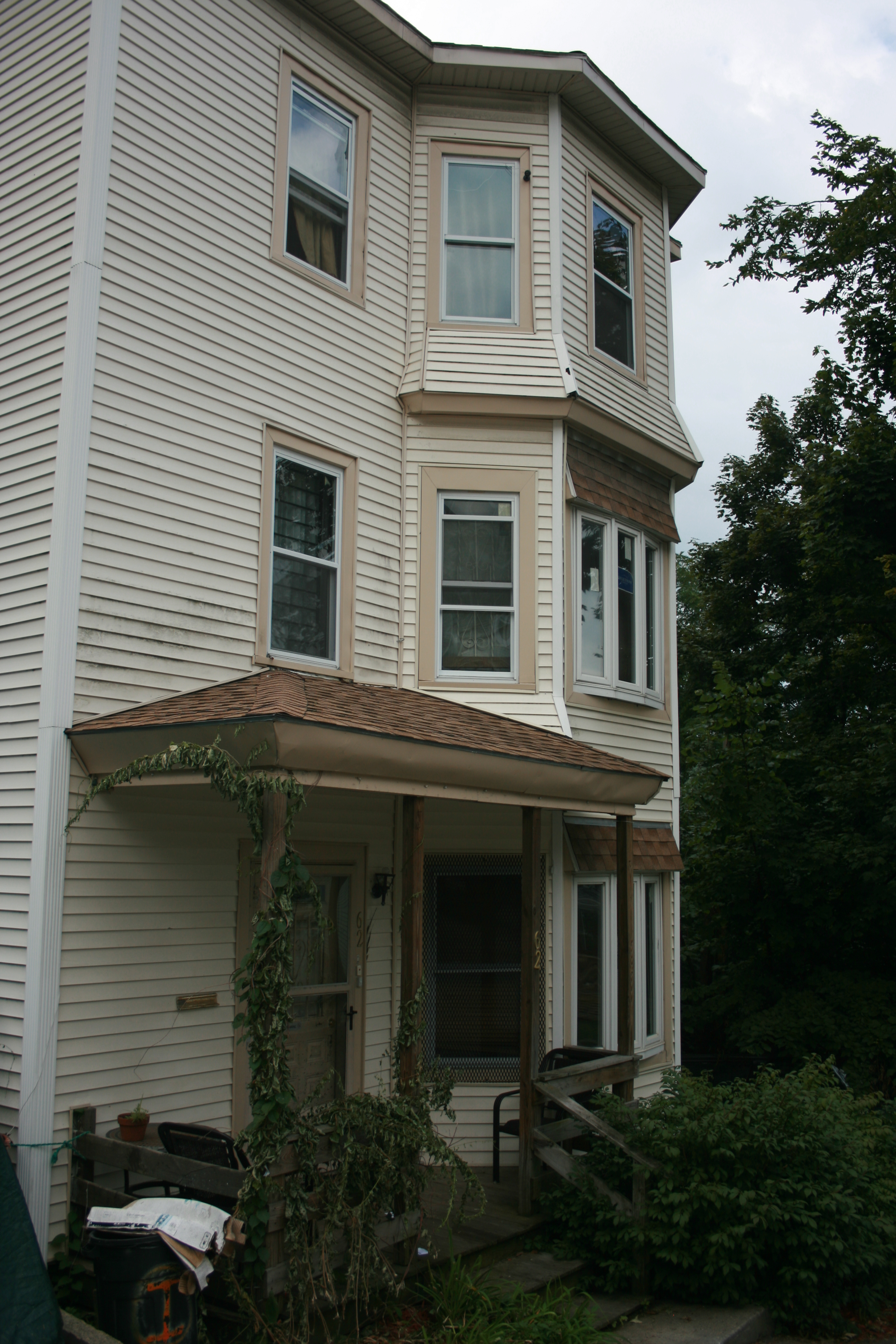

- Location within Massachusetts Location within the United States
- Location: 62 Catharine St., Worcester, Massachusetts
- Coordinates: 42°16′26″N 71°47′16″W
- Area: less than one acre
- Built: 1894
- Architectural style: Queen Anne
- MPS: Worcester Three-Deckers TR
- NRHP reference No.: 89002398
- Added to NRHP: February 9, 1990

The Rodney Davis Three-Decker is a historic triple decker house in Worcester, Massachusetts. Built in 1894, it is typical of early triple deckers built in the city's developing Belmont Hill neighborhood, although its more elaborate Queen Anne porch decorations have been lost. The building was listed on the National Register of Historic Places in 1990.

== Description and history ==
The Rodney Davis Three-Decker is located in a residential area on Worcester's east side Belmont Hill neighborhood, on the south side of Catharine Street between Eastern and Rodney Streets. It is a three-story wood-frame structure, with a hip roof and its exterior finished in modern siding. It has an asymmetrical front facade, with a projecting three-story polygonal bay on the right, and a single bay on the left with the building entrance on the ground floor and windows on the upper floors. The entrance is sheltered by a low-pitch gable roof supported by modern square posts. The porch once had more elaborate Queen Anne decorations, including turned posts and balusters, but these have been lost. The bays have flared skirting below the windows, which was once finished in decorative cut shingles.

The house was built about 1894. During this period, Belmont Hill was in the early phase of intensive residential development. Rodney Davis, its first owner, was a draftsman who owned it as a rental property; its early tenants were mostly Scandinavian immigrants.

== See also ==
- National Register of Historic Places listings in eastern Worcester, Massachusetts
