= Joseph Davis House =

Historic house in Massachusetts, United States

- U.S. National Register of Historic Places
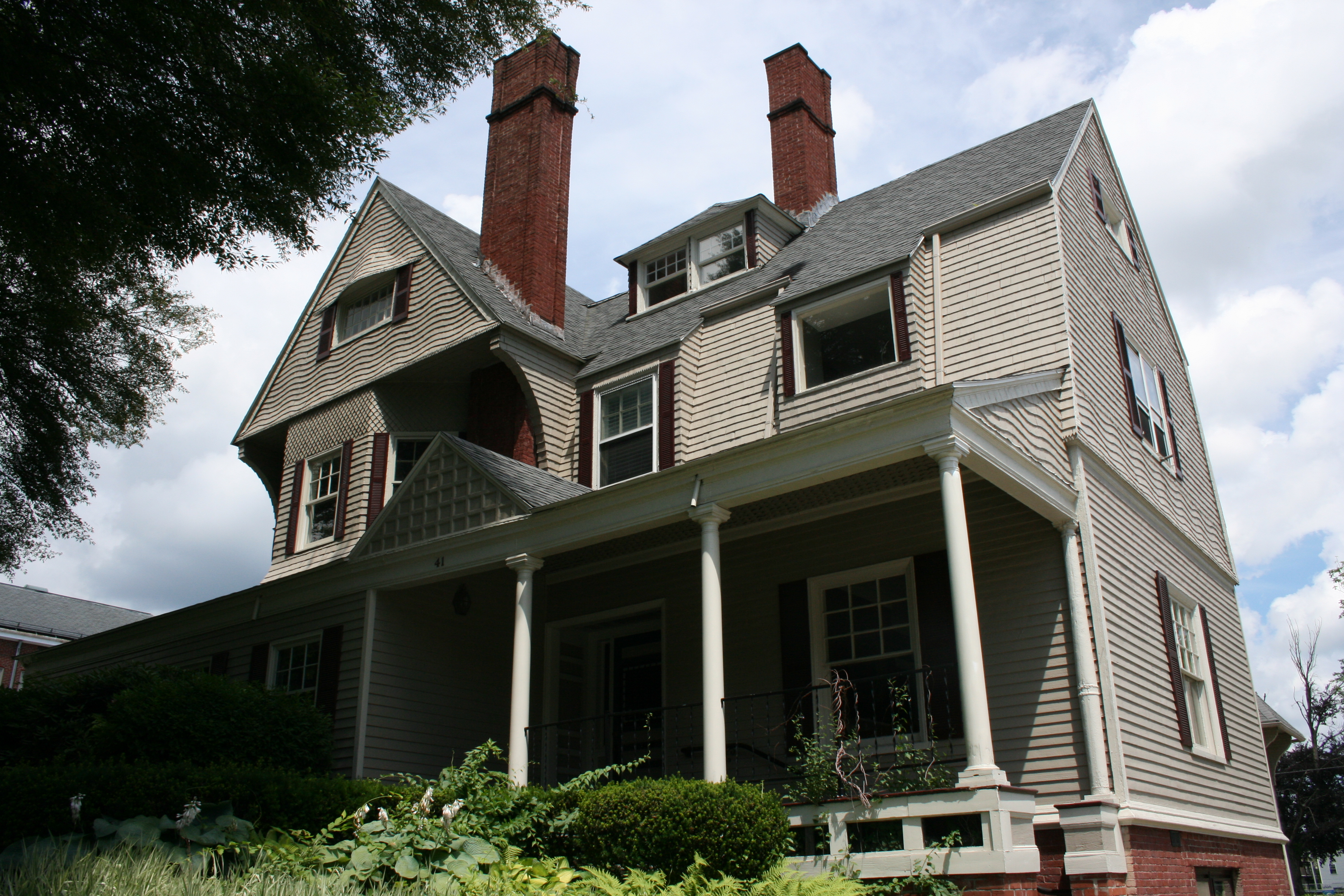

- Location within Massachusetts Location within the United States
- Location: 41 Elm St., Worcester, Massachusetts
- Coordinates: 42°15′55″N 71°48′23″W
- Area: less than one acre
- Built: 1884
- Architect: Peabody & Stearns
- Architectural style: Shingle Style
- MPS: Worcester MRA
- NRHP reference No.: 80000574
- Added to NRHP: March 05, 1980

The Joseph Davis House is a historic house at 41 Elm Street in Worcester, Massachusetts. The Shingle style house was built in 1884 to a design by the Boston architectural firm of Peabody & Stearns, and is one of the most elaborate of that style in the city. It was built for Joseph Davis, the son of prominent Worcester lawyer Isaac Davis, and was home for many years to William Rice, president of the Washburn and Moen Company The house was listed on the National Register of Historic Places in 1980. It now houses professional offices.

== Description and history ==
The Joseph Davis House is located in a mixed residential-commercial area west of downtown Worcester, at the northwest corner of Elm and Linden Streets. It is a sprawling 2 1/2-story frame structure, whose central core has a gambrel roof somewhat obscured by numerous projections and dormers. A large ell extends the building to the rear, which has a main gabled ridge parallel to that of the core block. The exterior is finished in a variety of wooden clapboards and shingles, some of the latter cut in decorative patterns. A single-story shed-roof porch extends across the right side of the front façade, supported by Tuscan columns; it has a gable in front of the main entrance, adorned with applied woodwork.

The house was built in 1884 for Joseph Davis, the son of Isaac Davis, and grandson by marriage of Levi Lincoln Jr. The house was built adjacent to the Lincoln mansion (no longer standing). Davis lived there until 1890, selling the property to William Rice, who became president of the Washburn and Moen Company the following year. Washington and Moen, later United States Steel, was one of Worcester's leading industrial employers. The property remained in the Rice family until 1953.

== See also ==
- Isaac Davis House
- National Register of Historic Places listings in northwestern Worcester, Massachusetts
- National Register of Historic Places listings in Worcester County, Massachusetts
