= Davis-Felton Plantation =

Historic plantation near Henderson, Georgia

- U.S. National Register of Historic Places
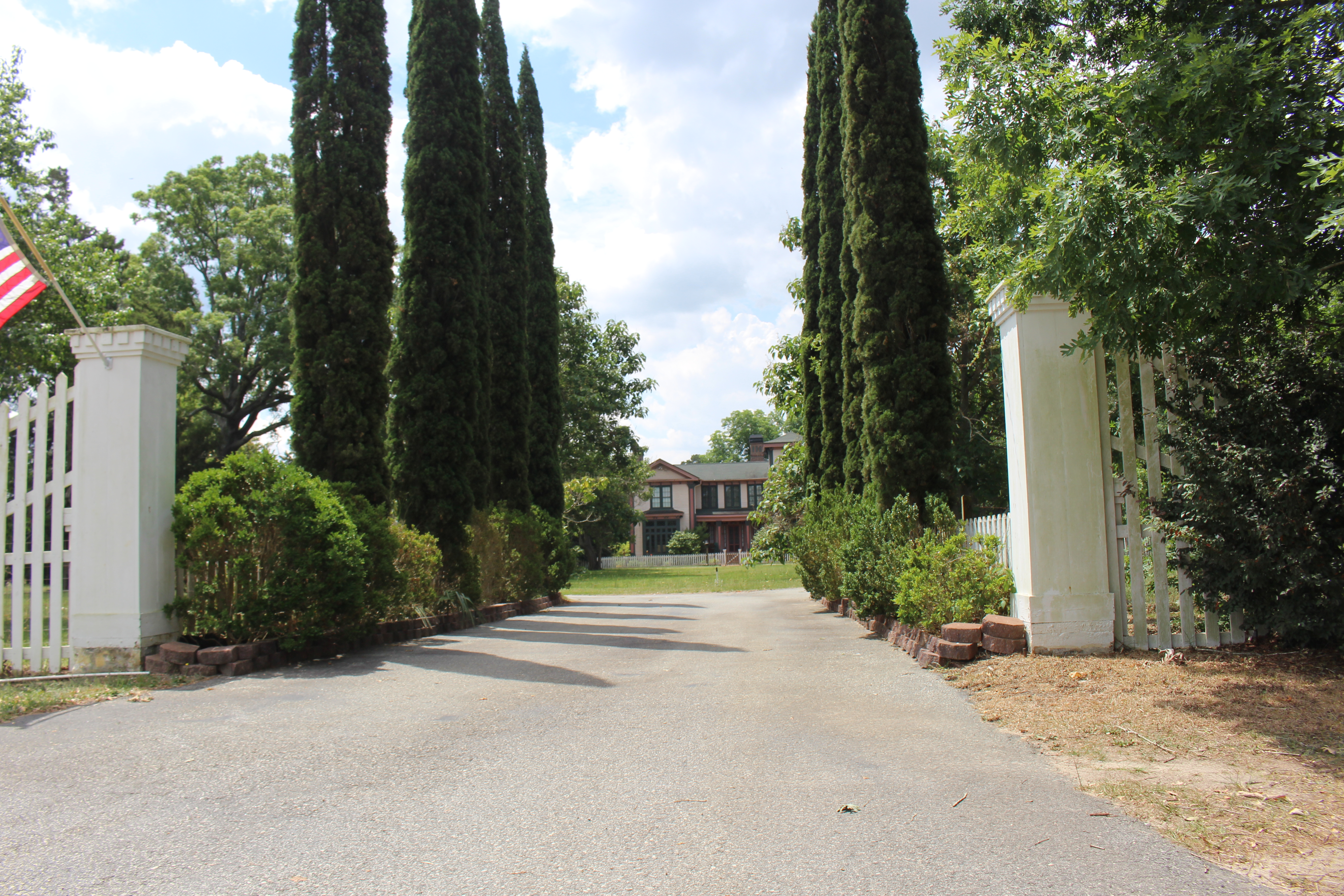

- Location within Georgia
- Nearest city: Henderson, Georgia
- Coordinates: 32°22′32″N 83°48′35″W
- Area: 1,772.5 acres (717.3 ha)
- Built: 1855
- Architect: William Mayzck Davis; Et al.
- Architectural style: Italianate
- NRHP reference No.: 79000731
- Added to NRHP: November 13, 1979

The Davis-Felton Plantation, near Henderson in Houston County, Georgia, is a plantation that was listed on the National Register of Historic Places in 1979. It is located northwest of Henderson on Felton Rd. The plantation was also known as Mossy Hill.

== Structures ==
The listing on the National Register of Historic Places includes 1,772.5 acres (2.7695 sq mi) with six contributing buildings, four contributing structures, and six contributing sites. The site's main house is a two-story Italianate style plantation house, with a three-story tower, which was built with the forced labor of enslaved people c. 1855. The property also includes a peach-packing plant built in the 1930s and several tenant houses.

== History ==
The plantation was built for William Mayzck Davis (1820 – 1870), who moved to Georgia from South Carolina in the 1850s to establish the property as a cotton plantation. He moved his family to the property in 1859.

According to Davis family tradition, William Mazyck Davis designed the house and oversaw its construction by his own skilled slaves and the slaves of his brother Edward. The design is not dissimilar to several in Andrew Downing's The Architecture of Country Houses (1850). Davis was a major planter in Houston County. The slave census of 1860 records that he owned 94 slaves, while the 1864 tax digest lists the number of slaves as 110. During the Civil War, Davis organized and served as captain of Company H, Henderson Rangers, 45th Regiment.

As of 2026, it is now for sale.
