= Davis House (Albuquerque, New Mexico) =

Historic house in New Mexico, United States

- U.S. National Register of Historic Places
- NM State Register of Cultural Properties
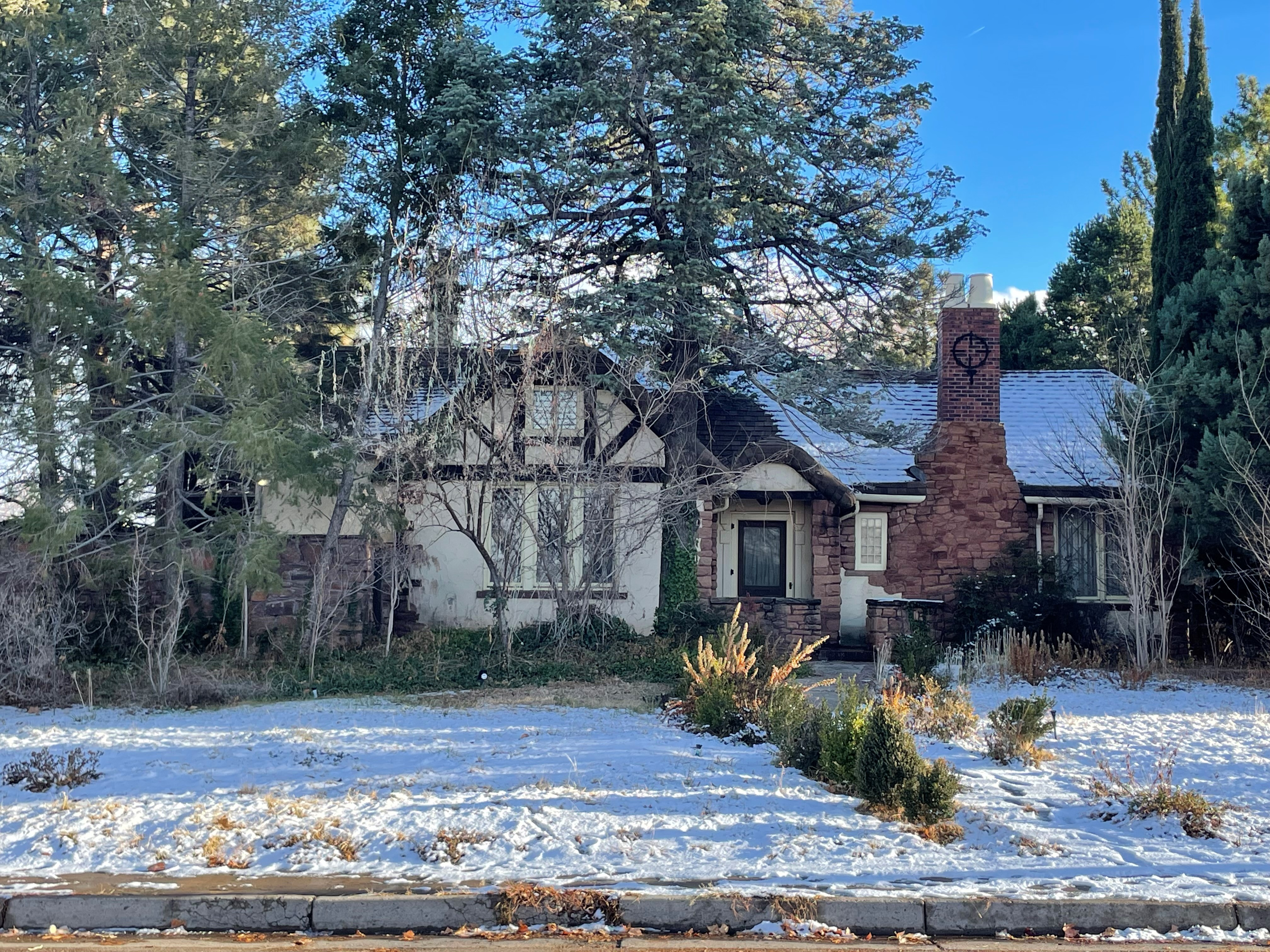
- Davis House, January 2024

- Location within New Mexico Location within the United States
- Location: 704 Parkland Circle, SE, Albuquerque, New Mexico
- Coordinates: 35°4′11″N 106°36′10″W
- Built: 1927–28
- Architect: A.W. Boehning
- Architectural style: Late 19th and 20th century revival styles
- NRHP reference No.: 80002531
- NMSRCP No.: 758

Significant dates
- Added to NRHP: November 17, 1980
- Designated NMSRCP: December 14, 1979

Davis House is a home in Albuquerque, New Mexico that was built in 1927–28. It was listed on the U.S. National Register of Historic Places in 1980. It was built as a model home, and its landscaping was designed by landscape architect A. W. Boehning, who designed landscaping in the entire development.

It was deemed "one of Albuquerque's best examples of a Period Revival Style, specifically the English or Ann Hathaway cottage style."
