= Davis Stone House =

Historic house in New York, United States

- U.S. National Register of Historic Places
- Location within New York Location within the United States
- Location: 4652 NY 209, Rochester, New York
- Coordinates: 41°49′9″N 74°12′1″W
- Area: 15.5 acres (6.3 ha)
- Built: 1784
- Architectural style: Colonial
- MPS: Rochester MPS
- NRHP reference No.: 99000995
- Added to NRHP: August 12, 1999

Davis Stone House is a historic home located at Rochester in Ulster County, New York. It includes the house (c. 1784), small barn (c. 1920), and silo (c. 1920). The stone house is linear in plan with a perpendicular frame extension off the rear. The main stone section is one and one half stories, five bays wide with a central entrance, and pent roof.

It was listed on the National Register of Historic Places in 1999.
