= Henderson, Georgia =

- Unincorporated community Census-designated place
- Location within Georgia
- Coordinates: 32°0′15″N 81°16′4″W
- Country: United States
- State: Georgia
- Counties: Chatham

Area
  - Total: 1.81 sq mi (4.68 km^{2})
  - Land: 1.74 sq mi (4.50 km^{2})
  - Water: 0.069 sq mi (0.18 km^{2})
- Elevation: 10 ft (3.0 m)

Population (2020)
  - Total: 2,178
  - Density: 1,254.7/sq mi (484.43/km^{2})
- ZIP code: 31419
- Area code: 912
- FIPS code: 13-37910
- GNIS feature ID: 2633172

Henderson is an unincorporated community and census-designated place (CDP) in Chatham County, Georgia, United States. The population was 2,178 at the 2020 census. It is part of the Savannah metropolitan statistical area.

== Geography ==
Henderson is located in western Chatham County at 32°0′15″N 81°16′4″W. It occupies a triangular area bounded by Little Neck Road to the northeast, Georgia State Route 204 (the Abercorn Expressway) to the south, and Interstate 95 to the northwest. Downtown Savannah is 15 miles (24 km) to the northeast.

The Henderson Golf Course dominates the community's south side, with housing developments set around and between the links. Commercial development is concentrated on Henderson's southwest corner, adjacent to I-95's exit 94.

According to the United States Census Bureau, the Henderson CDP has a total area of 1.8 square miles (4.7 km^{2}), of which 1.7 square miles (4.5 km^{2}) is land and 0.12 square miles (0.3 km^{2}), or 5.29%, is water.

== Demographics ==
Historical population
Census	Pop.	Note	%±
2010	1,647		—
2020	2,178		32.2%
U.S. Decennial Census; 1850-1870 1870-1880; 1890-1910 1920-1930; 1940 1950 1960; 1970 1980 1990; 2000 2010 2020

Henderson first appeared in the 2010 U.S. census.

=== Racial and ethnic composition ===
Henderson, Georgia – Racial and ethnic composition Note: the US Census treats Hispanic/Latino as an ethnic category. This table excludes Latinos from the racial categories and assigns them to a separate category. Hispanics/Latinos may be of any race.
Race / Ethnicity (NH = Non-Hispanic)	Pop 2010	Pop 2020	% 2010	% 2020
White alone (NH)	1,065	1,039	64.66%	47.70%
Black or African American alone (NH)	338	724	20.52%	33.24%
Native American or Alaska Native alone (NH)	4	5	0.24%	0.23%
Asian alone (NH)	94	147	5.71%	6.75%
Pacific Islander alone (NH)	0	2	0.00%	0.09%
Some Other Race alone (NH)	4	10	0.24%	0.46%
Mixed Race or Multi-Racial (NH)	30	83	1.82%	3.81%
Hispanic or Latino (any race)	112	168	6.80%	7.71%
Total	1,647	2,178	100.00%	100.00%

=== 2020 census ===
As of the 2020 census, Henderson had a population of 2,178. The median age was 33.1 years. 17.2% of residents were under the age of 18 and 12.6% of residents were 65 years of age or older. For every 100 females there were 89.9 males, and for every 100 females age 18 and over there were 89.9 males age 18 and over.

100.0% of residents lived in urban areas, while 0.0% lived in rural areas.

There were 1,013 households in Henderson, including 548 families, and 24.1% had children under the age of 18 living in them. Of all households, 38.4% were married-couple households, 23.1% were households with a male householder and no spouse or partner present, and 28.5% were households with a female householder and no spouse or partner present. About 29.0% of all households were made up of individuals and 6.1% had someone living alone who was 65 years of age or older.

There were 1,127 housing units, of which 10.1% were vacant. The homeowner vacancy rate was 0.9% and the rental vacancy rate was 14.7%.
