= Decatur O. Davis House =

Historic house in Virginia, United States

- U.S. National Register of Historic Places
- Virginia Landmarks Register
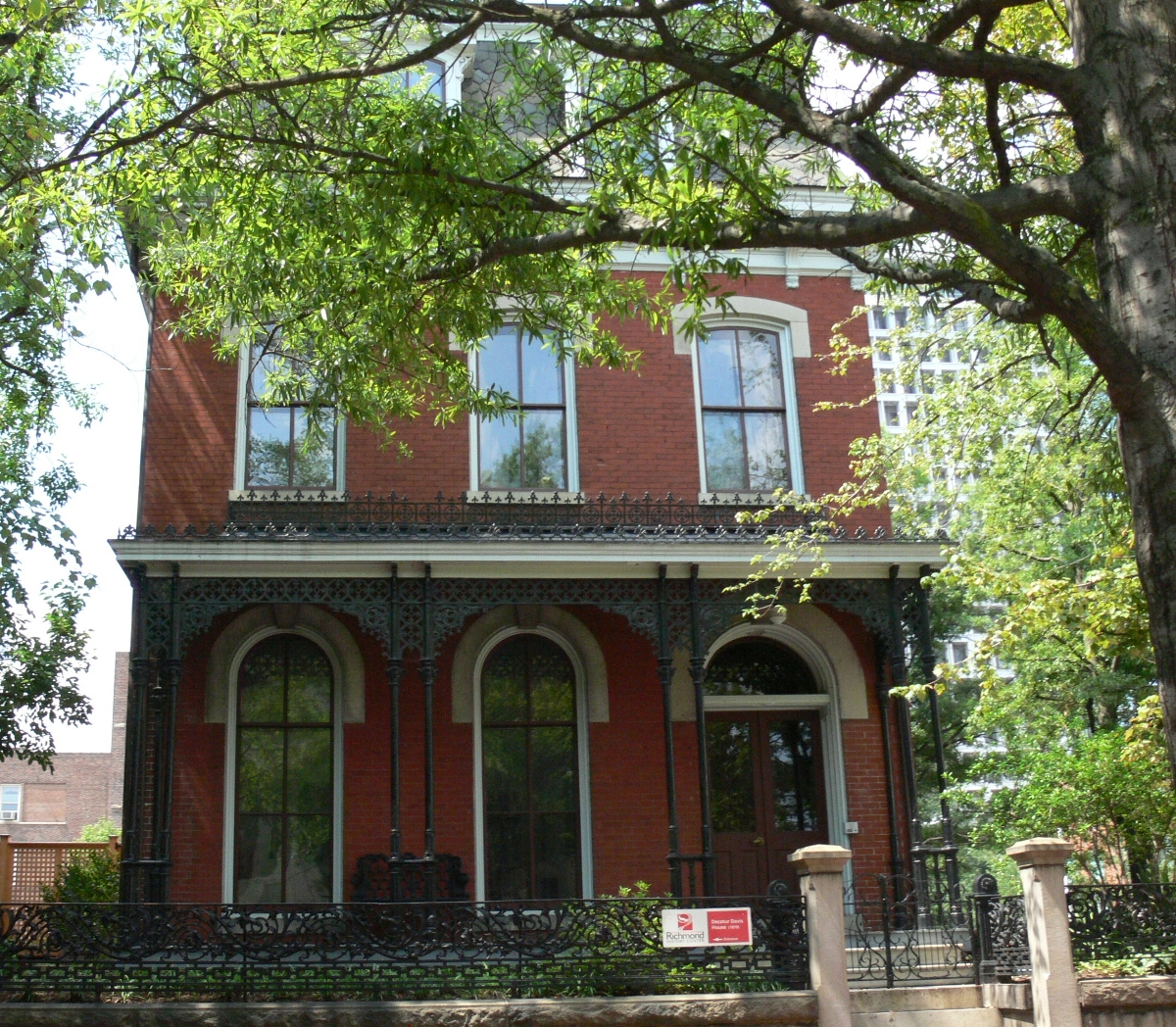
- Decatur O. Davis House, July 2011

- Location within Virginia Location within the United States
- Location: 1001 E. Clay St., Richmond, Virginia
- Coordinates: 37°32′31″N 77°25′54″W
- Area: 0.1 acres (0.040 ha)
- Built: 1879
- Architect: West, Albert Lawrence
- Architectural style: Second Empire
- NRHP reference No.: 00000490
- VLR No.: 127-0177

Significant dates
- Added to NRHP: May 11, 2000
- Designated VLR: March 15, 2000

Decatur O. Davis House is a historic home located in Richmond, Virginia. It was designed by architect Albert Lawrence West and built in 1879. It is a three-story, three-bay, Second Empire style brick dwelling with a mansard roof. It has an offset, two-story south wing. It features granite and iron ornamentation and a rare rinceau cast-iron fence.

It was listed on the National Register of Historic Places in 2000.
