= Scott-Davis House =

Historic house in Arkansas, United States

- U.S. National Register of Historic Places
- Location within Arkansas Location within the United States
- Nearest city: Romance, Arkansas
- Coordinates: 35°13′41″N 92°3′29″W
- Area: 1.5 acres (0.61 ha)
- Built: 1905
- Architectural style: Vernacular double-pile center
- MPS: White County MPS
- NRHP reference No.: 91001306
- Added to NRHP: July 20, 1992

The Scott-Davis House is a historic house in rural White County, Arkansas. It is located south of the small community of Romance, on the south side of Blackjack Mountain Road, west of its junction with Wayne Walker Road (County Road 15). In appearance it is a 1 1/2-story double pile structure, with a gabled and hipped roof, and a brick foundation. At its core is a dogtrot built out of logs c. 1869, which was extended to achieve its present appearance in 1905.

The house was listed on the National Register of Historic Places in 1992.

== See also ==
- National Register of Historic Places listings in White County, Arkansas
