= Davis Carriage House =

- U.S. National Register of Historic Places
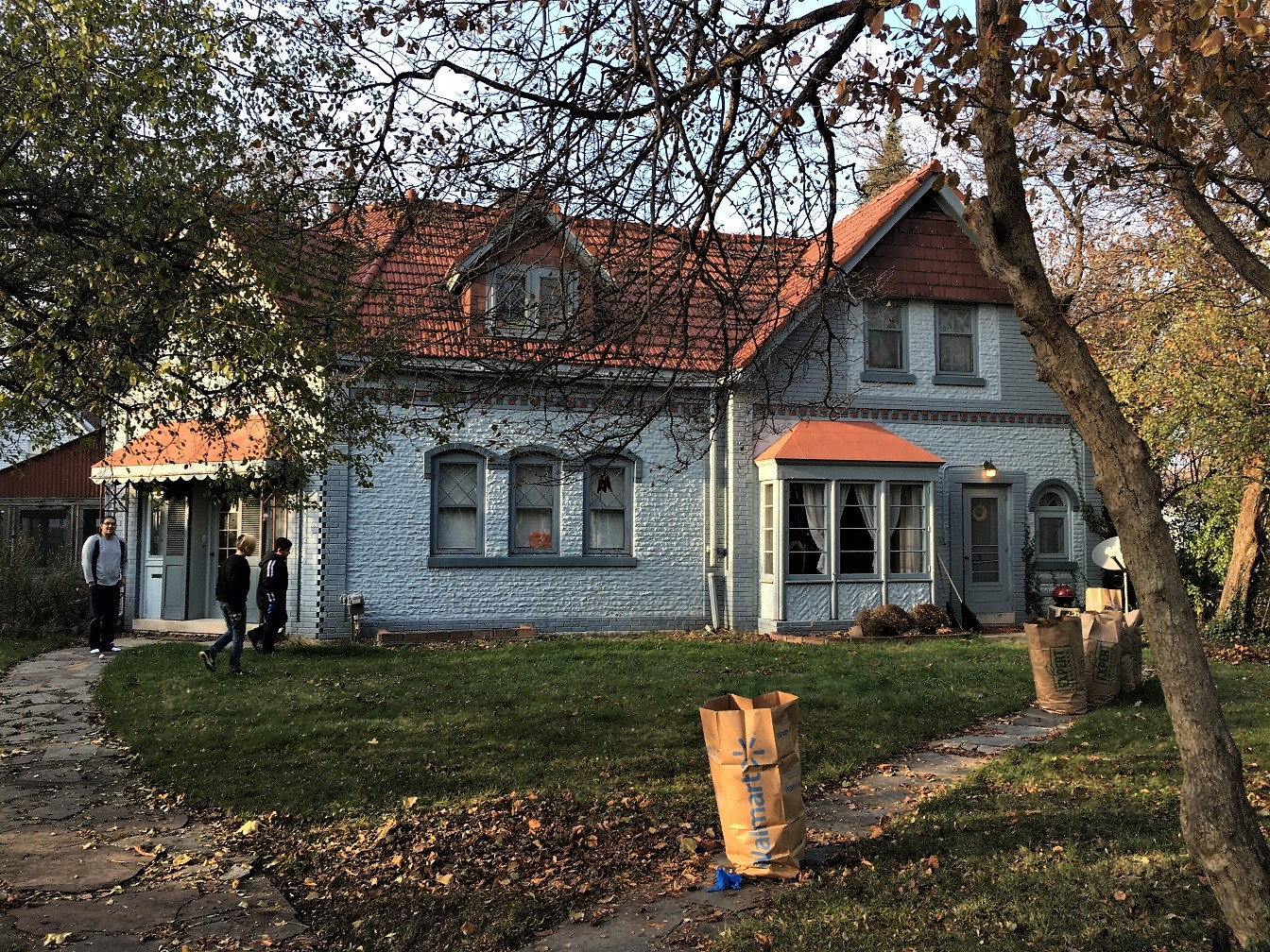
- Interactive map
- Location: 519 N. Fayette, Saginaw, Michigan
- Coordinates: 43°25′16″N 83°57′39″W
- Area: less than one acre
- Built: 1887
- Architect: James A. Spence Sr.; Robert B. Franz
- Architectural style: Queen Anne
- MPS: Center Saginaw MRA
- NRHP reference No.: 82002863
- Added to NRHP: July 9, 1982

The Davis Carriage House is a single family home (originally constructed as a carriage house) located at 519 N. Fayette in Saginaw, Michigan. It was listed on the National Register of Historic Places in 1982.

== History ==
Charles H. Davis was born in Massachusetts, and as a young man, moved the Saginaw in 1869. There, he took a job as a stockyard worker in one of timber magnate Ammi W. Wright's mills. Wright noticed Davis, and soon promoted him to bookkeeper and then mill manager. Eventually, Davis bought into the form, changing its name to the Wright and Davis Sawmill. From there, Davis expanded his business interests into banking, railroading, and other lumber activities throughout Michigan and Minnesota. In 1887, Davis built a mansion on Michigan Avenue, which included a carriage house that was at the time located behind the main house, which provided space for vehicles as well as a servant's quarters.

Davis's mansion was eventually demolished to construct what is now the Covenant Healthcare Hospital. The carriage house no longer remains. Razed in 2025 by Covenant Healthcare. In 1934, Saginaw architects James A. Spence, Sr. and Robert B. Franz redesigned the interior to convert it into a single family home, without changing the exterior.

== Description ==
The Davis Carriage House is a Queen Anne structure, and contains Queen Anne design elements such as corbeled brick ornamentation, gables, dormers, and bay windows. The design is reminiscent of an English country cottage, exemplified by windows leaded with diamond shaped panes, a red roman tile roof, a white-washed stone fence with a black iron grid. It is complemented by surrounding landscaping containing ivy, trees, and bushes.
