= Davis–Adcock Store =

- U.S. National Register of Historic Places
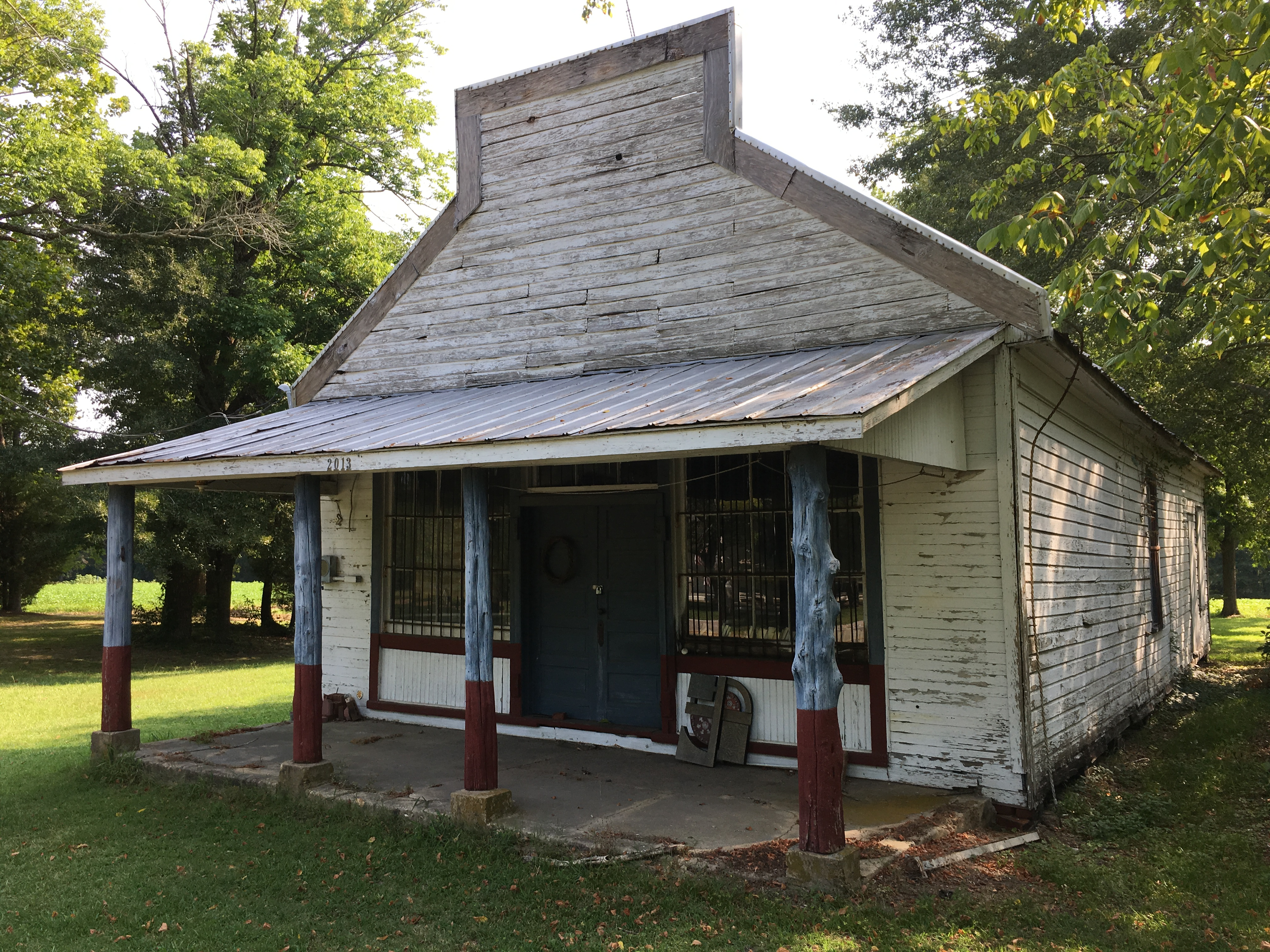

- Location within North Carolina Location within the United States
- Location: 2013 Piney Grove-Wilbon Rd., Holly Springs, North Carolina
- Coordinates: 35°36′11″N 78°50′21″W
- Area: less than one acre
- Built: 1906
- MPS: Wake County MPS
- NRHP reference No.: 06000788
- Added to NRHP: September 6, 2006

The Davis–Adcock Store is a historic general store located in Holly Springs, North Carolina, a crossroads north of Fuquay-Varina, in Wake County, North Carolina. The building was constructed in 1906, and is a one-story, frame, gable-front building, with a standing-seam metal roof and a stepped-parapet false front. The community store served not only as a local distribution center for goods and services, but also as a center of community social life. The building also housed the local post office from 1906 until 1925.

It was listed on the National Register of Historic Places in September 2006.

== See also ==
- List of Registered Historic Places in North Carolina
