= Anson Davis House and Springhouse =

Historic house in Ohio, United States

- Anson Davis House; Anson Davis Springhouse
- U.S. National Register of Historic Places
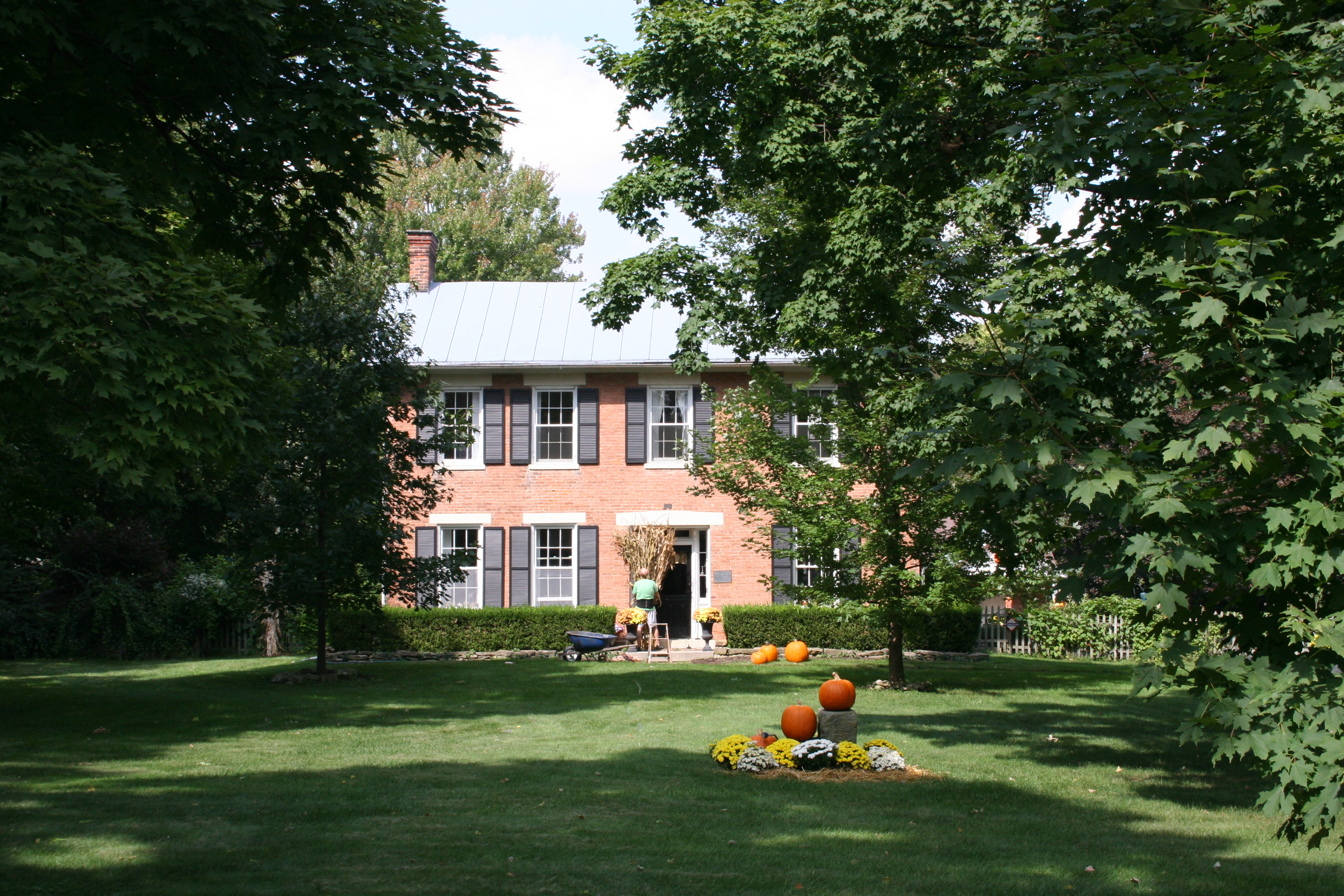
- Main house, 2014
- Interactive map highlighting the buildings' locations
- Location: 4900 Hayden Run Rd., Columbus, Ohio
- Coordinates: 40.065922°N 83.123120°W; 40.066018°N 83.123020°W
- Built: 1848 (house); 1850 (springhouse)
- NRHP reference No.: 75001402 (house); 79002907 (springhouse)
- Added to NRHP: July 7, 1975 (house); April 11, 1979 (springhouse)

The Anson Davis House and Anson Davis Springhouse are historic buildings in Columbus, Ohio, United States. The house was listed on the National Register of Historic Places in 1975, and the springhouse in 1979. The two properties are the only remaining original structures from the once-extensive farm. The 137-acre (55 ha) estate was deeded to Anson Davis from his father Samuel, a veteran of the Revolutionary War.

== House ==
The two-story brick residence was constructed in 1848. It features a 1.5-story ell, built in 1854, with two dormers added in 1926. Anson Davis's father Samuel selected the house's site and planned its construction.

== Springhouse ==
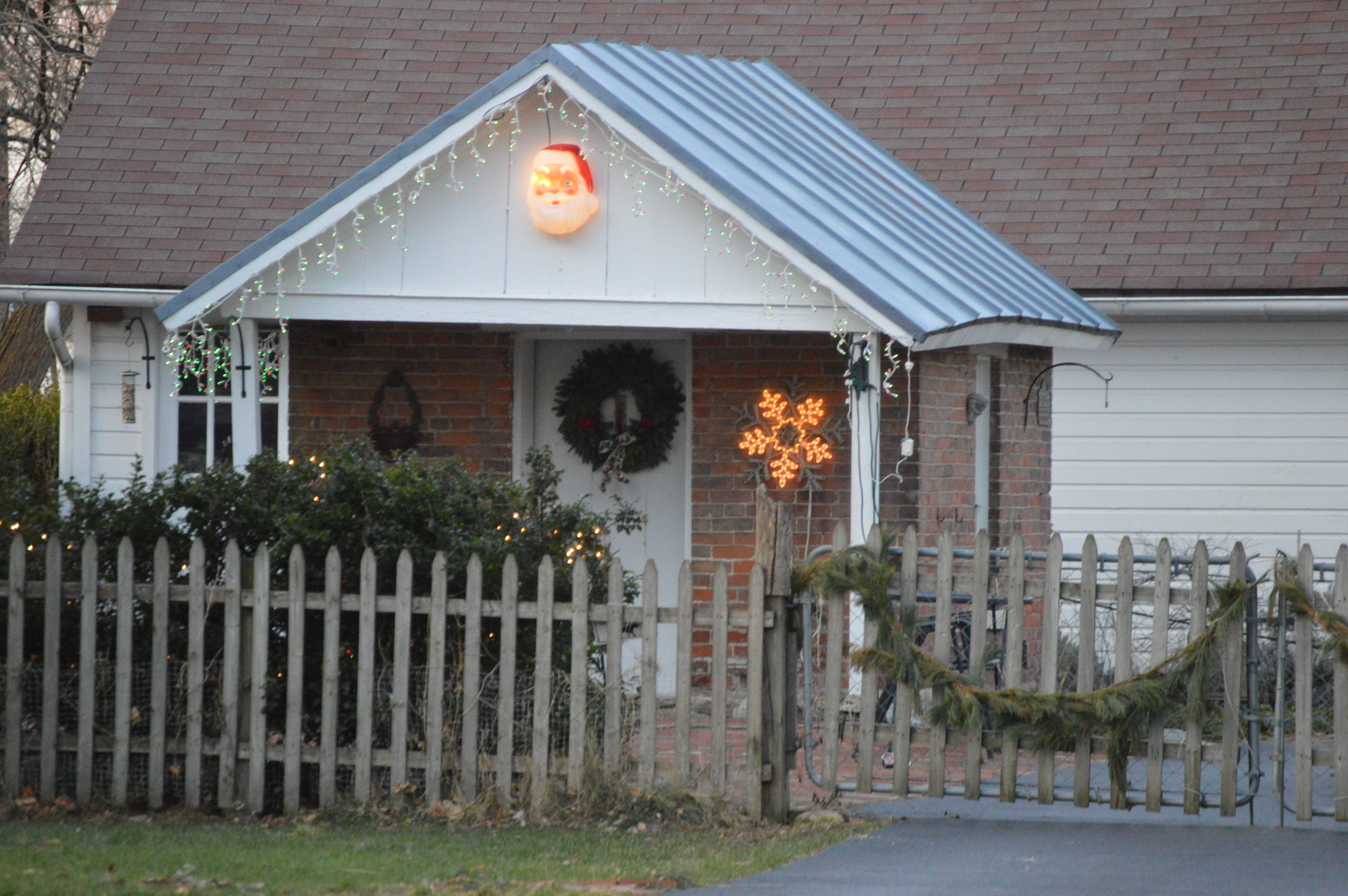
Springhouse, in front of the property's garage, in 2015

The Anson Davis Springhouse, also on the property, is listed separately on the National Register. Samuel built the one-story brick springhouse building for his son around 1850.

== See also ==
- National Register of Historic Places listings in Columbus, Ohio
