= McClelland-Davis House =

Historic house in North Carolina, United States

- U.S. National Register of Historic Places
- Location within North Carolina Location within the United States
- Location: SR 1551, Statesville, North Carolina
- Coordinates: 35°49′51″N 80°55′28″W
- Area: 11.5 acres (4.7 ha)
- Built: c. 1835
- Architectural style: Greek Revival, Federal
- MPS: Iredell County MRA
- NRHP reference No.: 80002873
- Added to NRHP: November 24, 1980

McClelland-Davis House is a historic home located near Statesville, Iredell County, North Carolina. The house was built about 1830, and is a two-story, five bay by two bay, transitional Federal / Greek Revival style frame dwelling. It has a gable roof, one-story rear wing, and two single shoulder brick end chimneys. Also on the property are the contributing smokehouse and well house.

It was added to the National Register of Historic Places in 1980.
