= Dr. Frank Davis House =

Historic house in Massachusetts, United States

- U.S. National Register of Historic Places
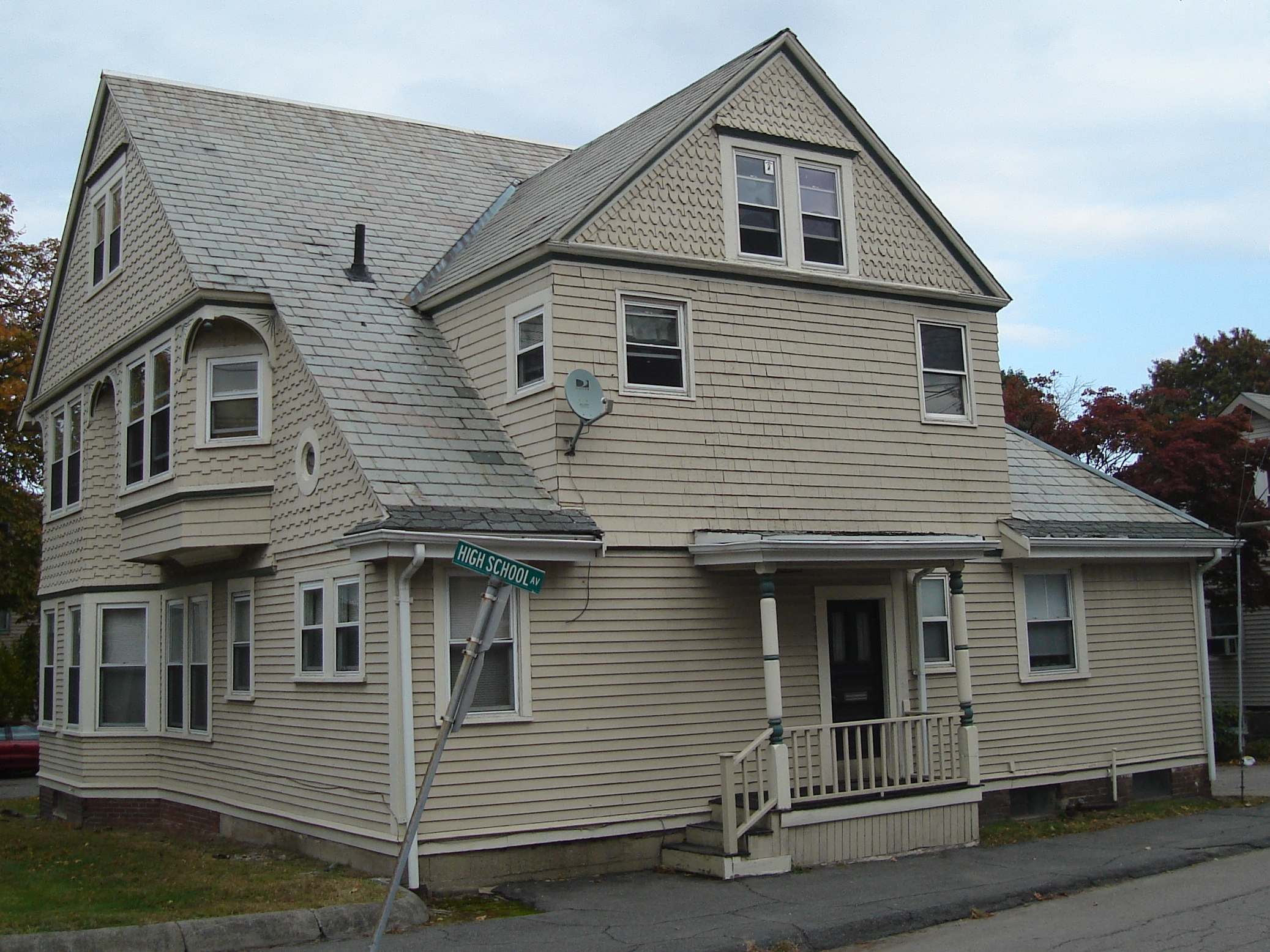

- Location within Massachusetts Location within the United States
- Location: 25 Elm St., Quincy, Massachusetts
- Coordinates: 42°14′48″N 70°59′57″W
- Built: 1890
- Architectural style: Shingle Style
- MPS: Quincy MRA
- NRHP reference No.: 89001330
- Added to NRHP: September 20, 1989

The Dr. Frank Davis House is a historic house at 25 Elm Street in Quincy, Massachusetts. The 2 1/2-story wood-frame house was built in the 1890s by a local doctor. It is one of the city's best-preserved Shingle style houses, complete with a period carriage (although it has been altered to accommodate automobiles). The house's front facade features a large gable that sweeps down to the first floor level, with decorative cut shingles at the upper levels, and bay window sections joined by arched woodwork.

The house was listed on the National Register of Historic Places in 1989.

== See also ==
- National Register of Historic Places listings in Quincy, Massachusetts
