= John Davis House (Fayetteville, North Carolina) =

Historic house in North Carolina, United States

- U.S. National Register of Historic Places
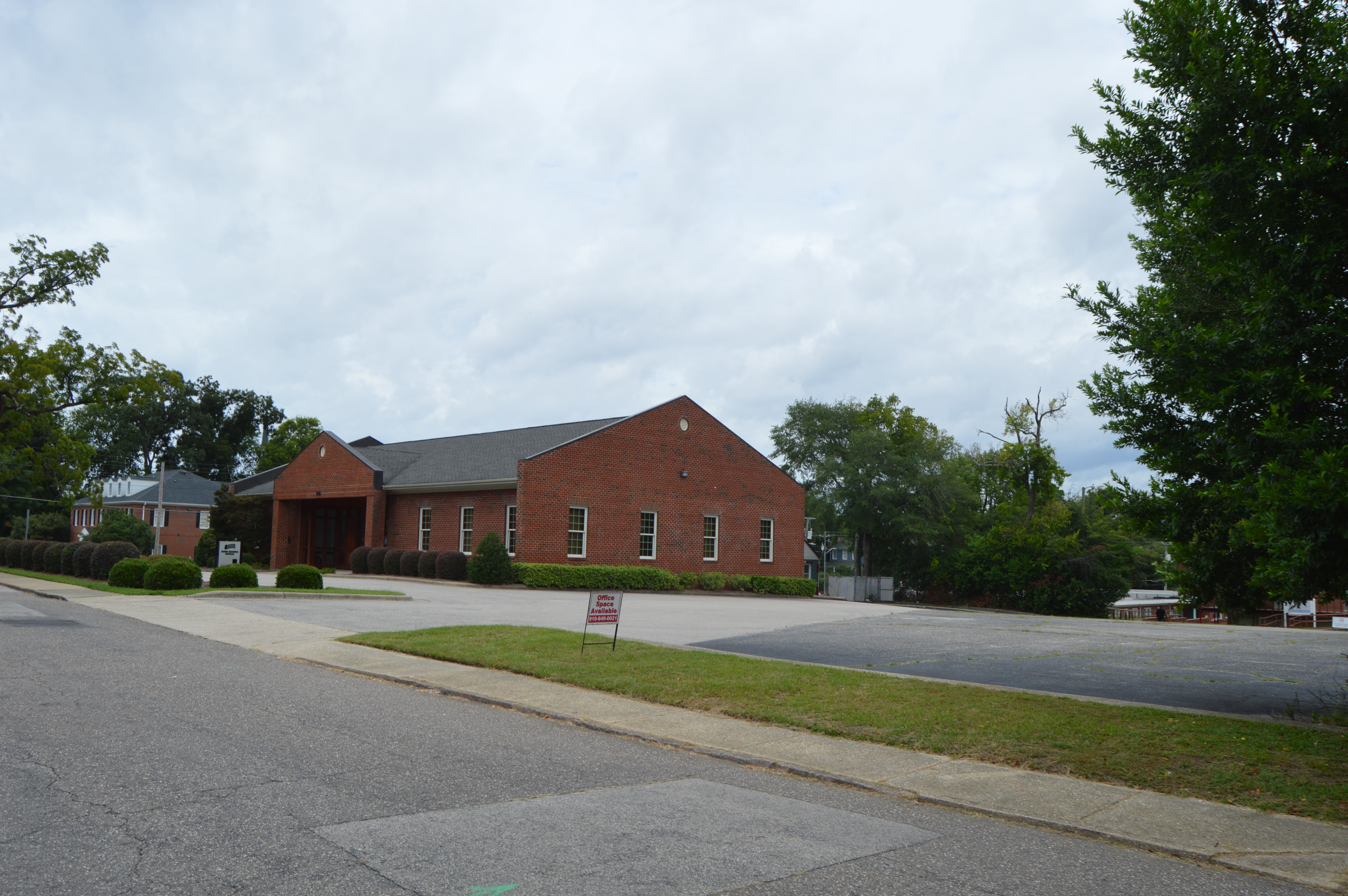
- Site of the house, now a commercial property

- Location within North Carolina Location within the United States
- Location: 910 Arsenal Ave., Fayetteville, North Carolina
- Coordinates: 35°3′18″N 78°53′45″W
- Area: less than one acre
- Built: 1870
- Architectural style: Late Victorian
- MPS: Fayetteville MRA
- NRHP reference No.: 83001848
- Added to NRHP: July 7, 1983

The John Davis House is a historic home located at Fayetteville, Cumberland County, North Carolina. It was built about 1870, and is a two-story, three-bay, frame dwelling Late Victorian style ornament. It rests on a brick pier foundation and has a gable roof with flared eaves. The front facade features a one-story shed roof porch, supported by four chamfered posts with lacy sawn brackets.

It was listed on the National Register of Historic Places in 1983.
