= Thomas Davis House (Kenton, Delaware) =

Historic house in Delaware, United States

- U.S. National Register of Historic Places
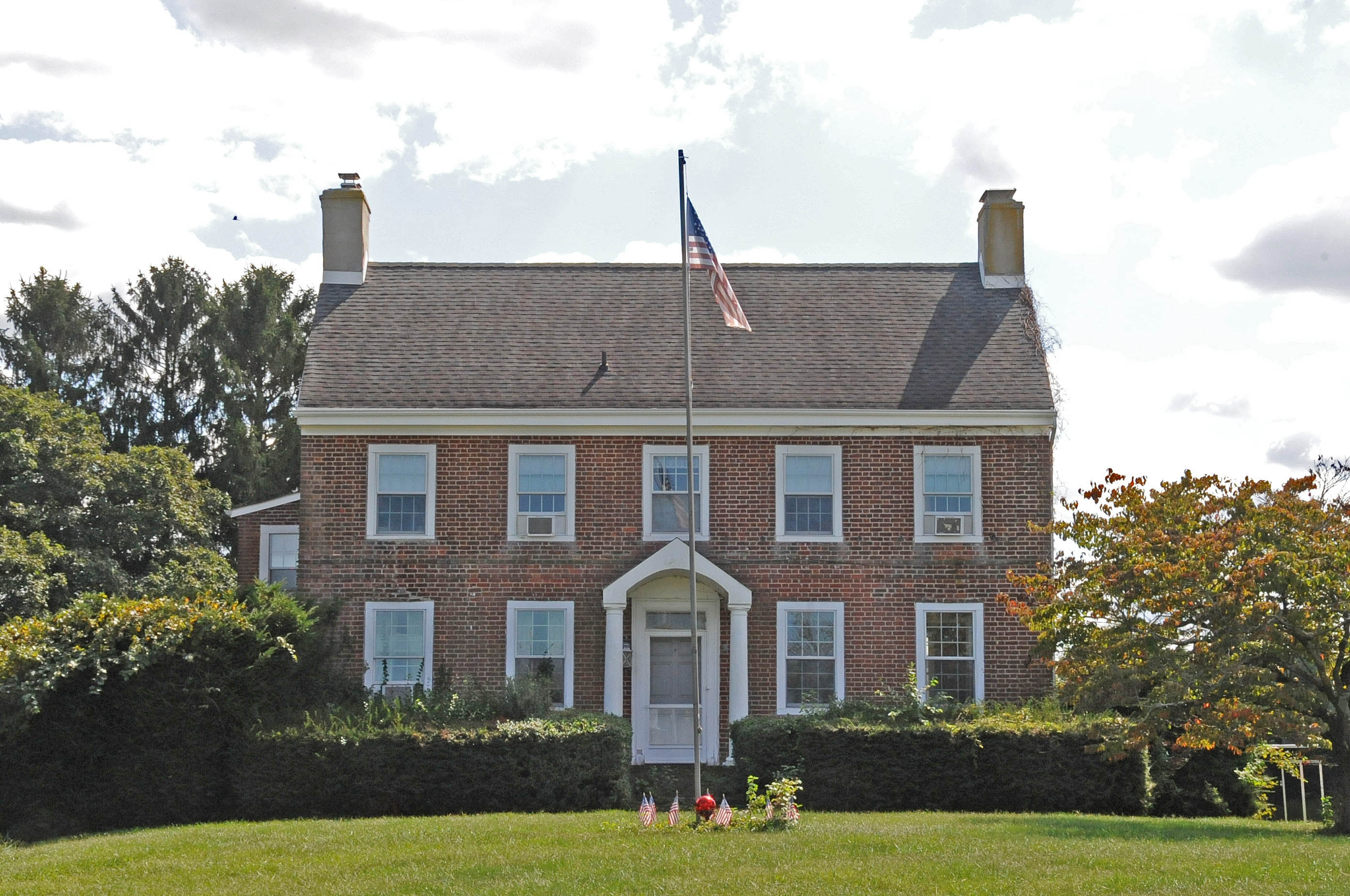

- Location within Delaware Location within the United States
- Location: Delaware Route 6, Kenton, Delaware
- Coordinates: 39°17′15″N 75°39′26″W
- Area: 155 acres (63 ha)
- Built: c. 1790
- Architectural style: Greek Revival, Federal
- MPS: Kenton Hundred MRA
- NRHP reference No.: 83001366
- Added to NRHP: February 28, 1983

Thomas Davis House is a historic home located at Kenton, Kent County, Delaware. The house was built about 1790, and is a two-story, five-bay, center hall plan brick dwelling in the Federal style. It has a gable roof and the front facade features an entrance portico replaced in the early 20th century. It has a rear wing added about 1840. The wing is in the Greek Revival style.

It was listed on the National Register of Historic Places in 1983.
