= Robert S. Davis House =

Historic house in Massachusetts, United States

- U.S. National Register of Historic Places
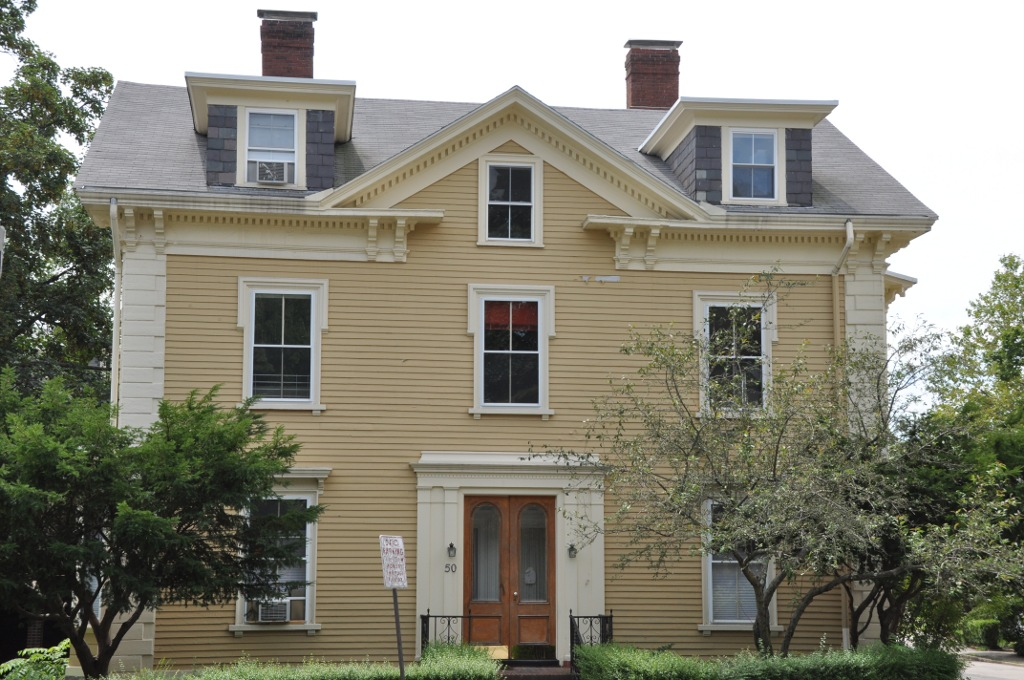

- Location within Massachusetts Location within the United States
- Location: 50 Stanton Rd., Brookline, Massachusetts
- Coordinates: 42°20′3″N 71°7′37″W
- Area: less than one acre
- Built: 1859
- Architectural style: Italianate
- MPS: Brookline MRA
- NRHP reference No.: 85003259
- Added to NRHP: October 17, 1985

The Robert S. Davis House is a historic house at 50 Stanton Road in Brookline, Massachusetts. Built about 1859 for the scion of a locally prominent family, it is one of the town's best-preserved examples of Italianate architecture. It was listed on the National Register of Historic Places in 1985.

== Description and history ==
The Robert S. Davis House is located in a residential area between Brookline Village and the town high school, at the southeast corner of Stanton and Greenough Streets. It is a 2 1/2-story wood-frame house, three bays wide, with a side-gable roof, twin interior chimneys, and a cupola. It has well-preserved Italianate styling, including corner quoins, deep eaves with dentil moulding and paired brackets, heavily capped windows on the first floor, and a central gable on the main facade.

The land on which this house was built belonged to Robert Sharp Davis, Sr. a descendant of Ebenezer Davis, who owned land in Brookline since the mid-18th century. It was built for Davis' son, also named Robert Sharp Davis, and is one of four similar Italianate houses in the immediate area. It is particularly rare as a well-preserved example of the classic Italianate box-like house with a central gable; most of the town's other Italianate houses outside this grouping are L-shaped in layout. The elder Davis' brother was Thomas Aspinwall Davis, who owned land on the other side of Brookline Village, and served as Mayor of Boston.

== See also ==
- National Register of Historic Places listings in Brookline, Massachusetts
