= John A. Davis House =

Historic house in Georgia, United States

- U.S. National Register of Historic Places
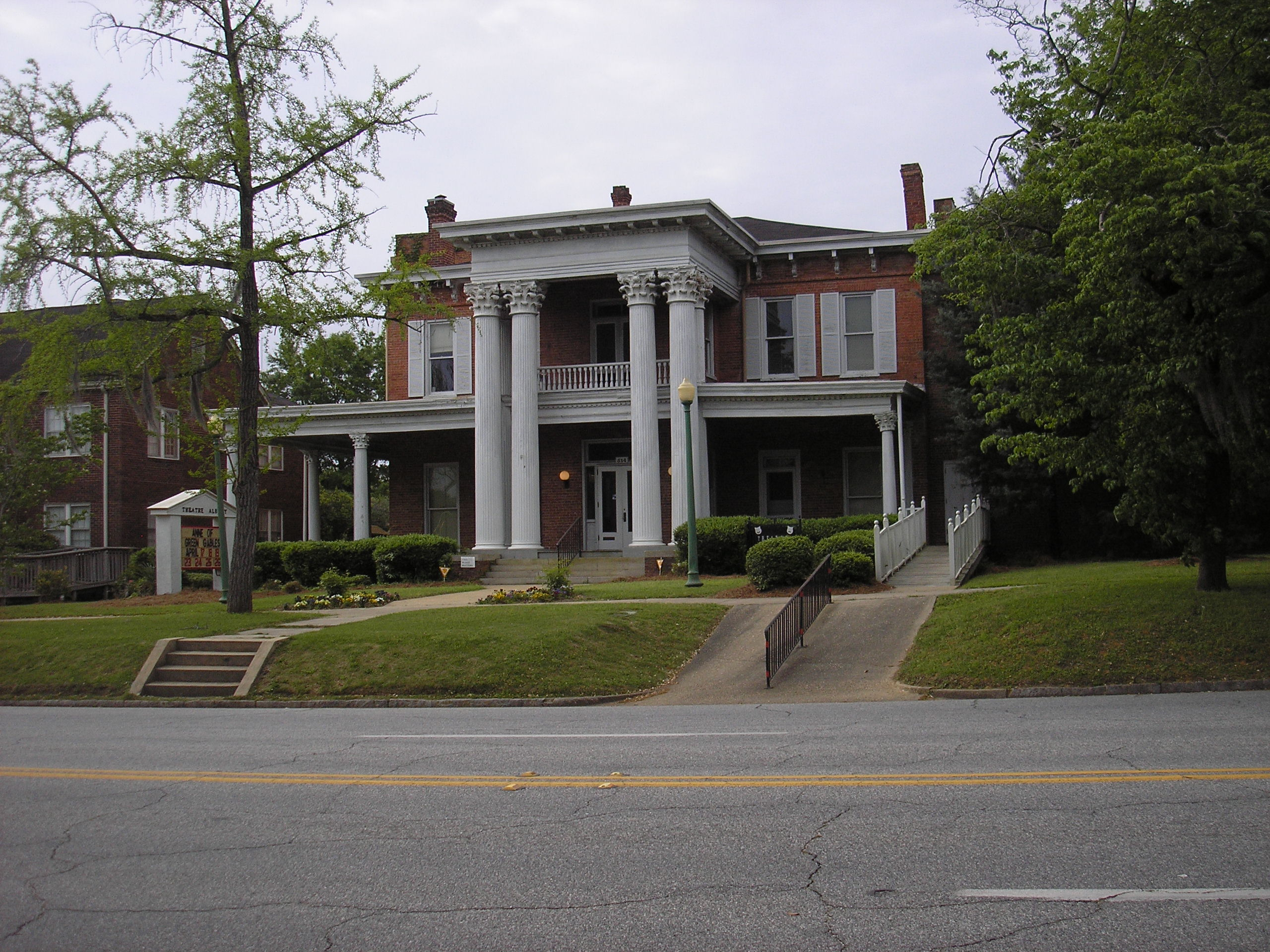

- Location within Georgia Location within the United States
- Location: 514 Pine Ave., Albany, Georgia
- Coordinates: 31°34′41″N 84°9′38″W
- Area: less than one acre
- Built: 1853
- Architectural style: Italianate, Classic Revival
- NRHP reference No.: 80001014
- Added to NRHP: October 16, 1980

The John A. Davis House, also known as Albany Little Theatre, is a historic building in downtown Albany, Georgia. The house, which has architectural distinction, was built in about 1853, and a contemporary 314-seat theater with no architectural pretensions was added at the rear in the 1960s. The building was listed on the National Register of Historic Places in 1980.

The house was originally built as an Italianate villa with a central brick tower flanked by one-story wooden porches. A Classical Revival portico and porches were added in the early 1900s.

Theatre Albany, a community theater founded in 1932, has been located in the house since 1964.
