= Davis Barn (Pleasant Grove, Arkansas) =

- U.S. National Register of Historic Places
- Location within Arkansas Location within the United States
- Nearest city: Pleasant Grove, Stone County, Arkansas
- Coordinates: 35°48′43″N 91°55′40″W
- Area: less than one acre
- Built: 1915
- Built by: Oket Davis
- Architectural style: Double Crib plan
- MPS: Stone County MRA
- NRHP reference No.: 85002225
- Added to NRHP: September 17, 1985

The Davis Barn is a historic barn in rural Stone County, Arkansas. It is located on the west side of Bob Davis Mountain Road (County Road 32) southwest of Pleasant Grove and Mill Creek. It is a single-story wood-frame structure, built on a double crib plan. It has vertical board siding, and an unusually wide driveway between the cribs. Built in 1915, it is a rare 20th-century example of the double crib form, which was more commonly executed in log construction in the 19th century.

The barn was listed on the National Register of Historic Places in 1985.

== See also ==
- National Register of Historic Places listings in Stone County, Arkansas
