= Joshua Davis House (Mt. Pleasant, Florida) =

Historic house in Florida, United States

- U.S. National Register of Historic Places
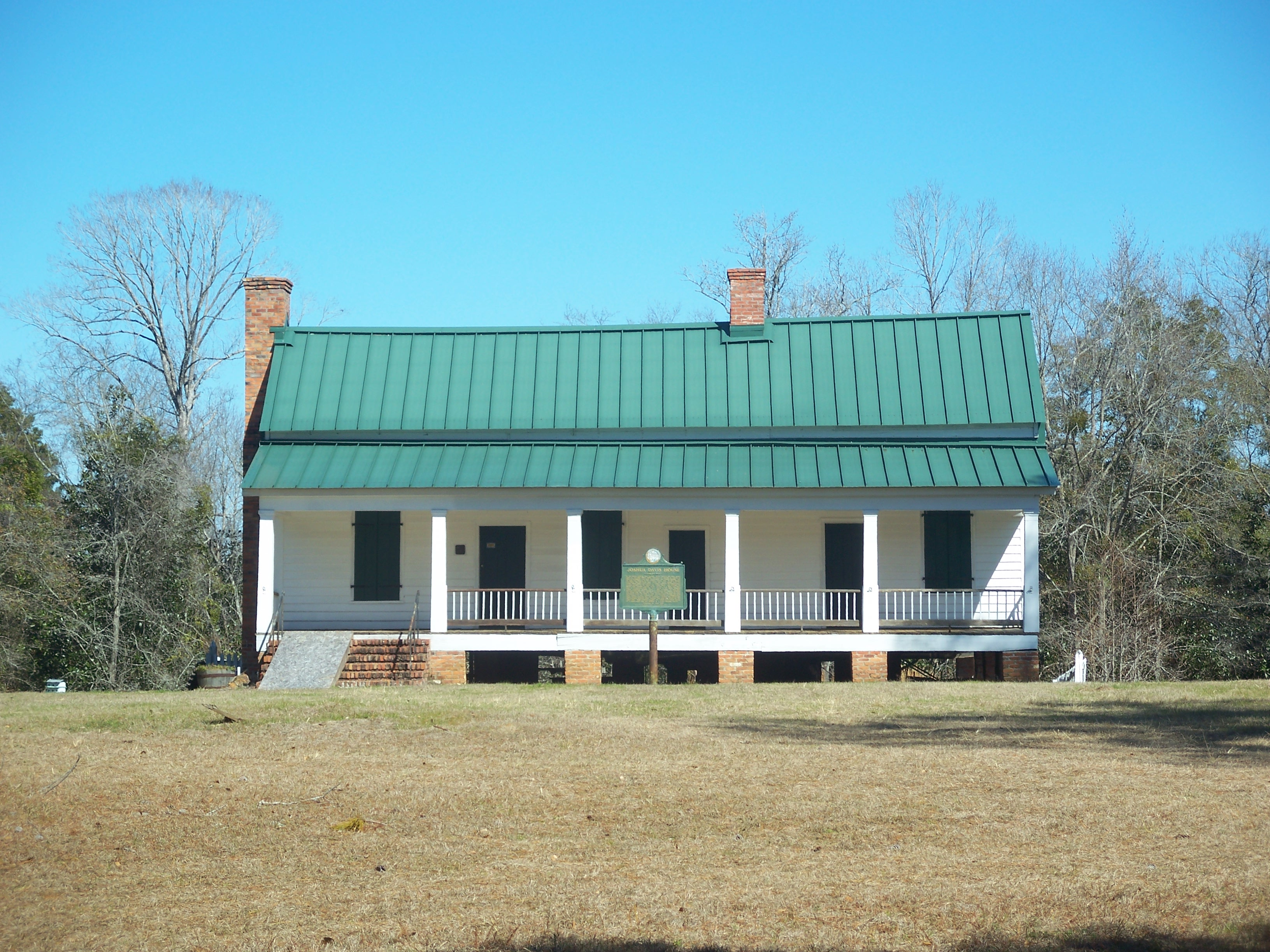

- Location within Florida Location within the United States
- Location: Mt. Pleasant, Florida
- Coordinates: 30°41′19″N 84°43′20″W
- Area: less than one acre
- Built: 1824
- Architect: Thomas Dawsey
- NRHP reference No.: 75000554
- Added to NRHP: May 21, 1975

The Joshua Davis House (also known as the Old Bates House or Thomas Dawsey Cabin or Old Stagecoach Stop) is a historic home in Gadsden County northwest of Mt. Pleasant, Florida. It is located two-and-a-half miles northwest of Mt. Pleasant on U.S. 90. On May 21, 1975, it was added to the U.S. National Register of Historic Places.
