= Davis–Ercanbrack Farmstead =

- Formerly listed on the U.S. National Register of Historic Places
- Location within Utah Location within the United States
- Location: 2044 South Main Street; Orem, Utah; United States
- Coordinates: 40°15′37″N 111°41′40″W
- Area: 8.1 acres (3.3 ha)
- Built: c.1870
- MPS: Orem, Utah MPS
- NRHP reference No.: 98001213

Significant dates
- Added to NRHP: October 2, 1998
- Removed from NRHP: July 23, 2018

The Davis–Ercanbrack Farmstead was a farmstead on the southern edge of Orem, Utah, United States, that was previously listed on the National Register of Historic Places (NRHP).

== Description ==
The former farmstead, located at 2044 South Main Street, was built in 1905. The core of the house dates from c.1870 but alterations since have been so considerable that no part clearly evokes that era. The historically significant period of the surviving property dates from 1905. Also, fruit was first grown on the property in 1905.

It was listed on the NRHP October 2, 1998. The listing included four contributing buildings on 8.1 acres (3.3 ha). After the Legacy Ridge residential development was built on the site of the former farmstead, the property was delisted from the NRHP July 23, 2018.

== See also ==
- National Register of Historic Places listings in Utah County, Utah
