= John Davis House (Chelsea, Maine) =

Historic house in Maine, United States

- U.S. National Register of Historic Places
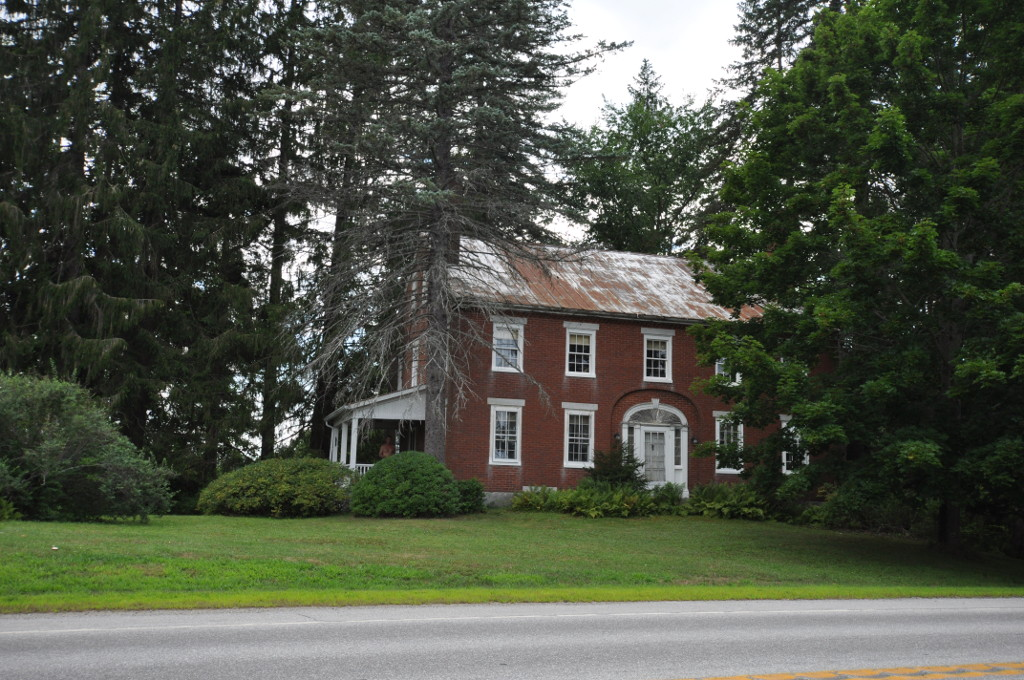

- Location within Maine Location within the United States
- Location: ME 9, Chelsea, Maine
- Coordinates: 44°16′31″N 69°46′21″W
- Area: 1 acre (0.40 ha)
- Built: 1815
- Built by: Davis, John
- Architectural style: Federal
- NRHP reference No.: 83000454
- Added to NRHP: July 14, 1983

The John Davis House is a historic house on River Road in Chelsea, Maine. Probably built between 1815 and 1820, it is a fine local example of a Federal period brick house, rivalling in quality those found in more urban environments of the period. It was probably built by John Davis, a local housewright of some renown. It was listed on the National Register of Historic Places in 1983.

== Description and history ==
The John Davis House stands on the west side of River Road (Maine State Route 9) in the rural community of Chelsea, opposite its junction with Pushard Lane. It is a 2 1/2-story brick building, with a gable roof and four irregularly placed chimneys. The main facade is five bays wide, with a center entrance flanked by sidelight windows and topped by a semi-elliptical transom window. The remaining bays are filled with sash windows, set in rectangular openings, with granite sills and lintels. A single-story shed-roof porch extends to one side. The interior features high quality Federal period woodwork and massive granite fireplace sills.

The house's construction date is uncertain. It was not standing when the earliest map was made of the area in 1815, and is referred to as the "John Davis Farm" in a deed from the 1860s. Davis was a well-known housewright in the region, and may have built the house not long after the land was surveyed. The house is nearly identical in form to houses found in surrounding towns. Little is known of Davis, but he is believed by local historians to have also built a number of those houses.

== See also ==
- National Register of Historic Places listings in Kennebec County, Maine
