= George Davis House (Toronto) =

House in Toronto, Canada

Coordinates: 43.6748°N 79.2839°W

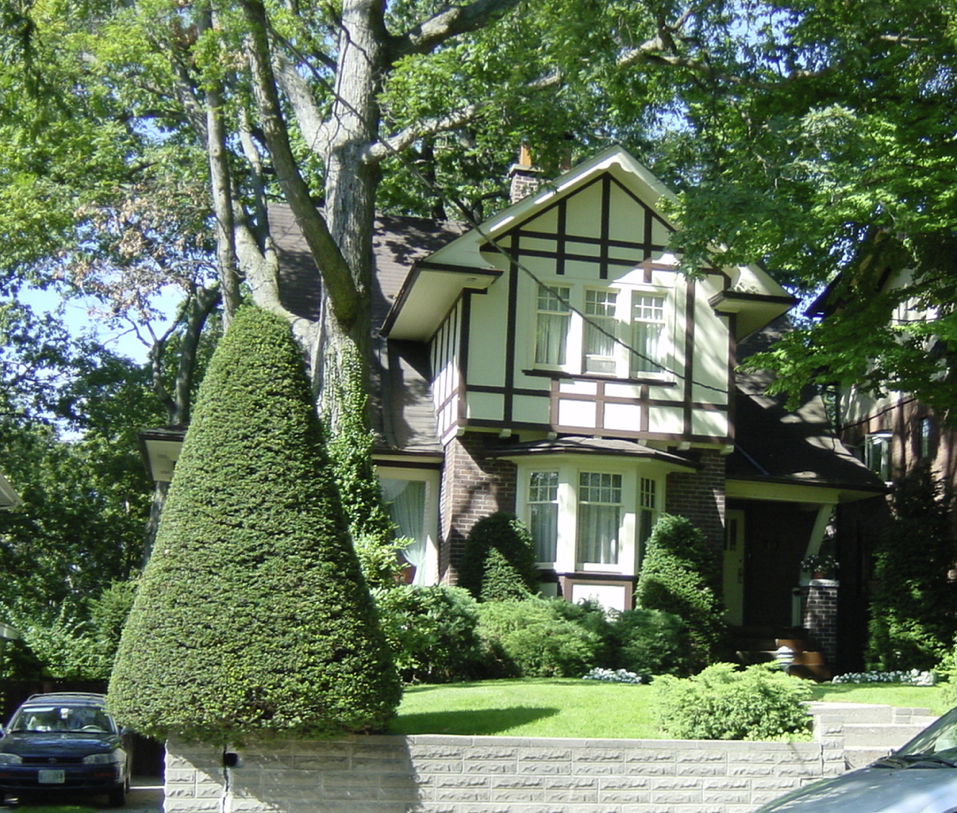
George Davis House, Kingswood Road, Toronto

The George Davis House, is a house in Toronto, Ontario built in 1919 and designated as a Toronto Heritage Property on September 30, 2004. The house is located at 40 Kingswood Road in the Beaches area of eastern Toronto and part of the Kingswood Road South Heritage Conservation District. The house was built for George Davis, an editor with Maclean's Publishing, and was later occupied by F.S. Hollister whose firm was involved in creating the World War 1 memorial windows in Ottawa's Peace Tower on Parliament Hill. The house is considered a good example of "Period Revival Design with English Tudor elements".
