= Joshua Davis House (Orem, Utah) =

Historic house in Utah, United States

- U.S. National Register of Historic Places
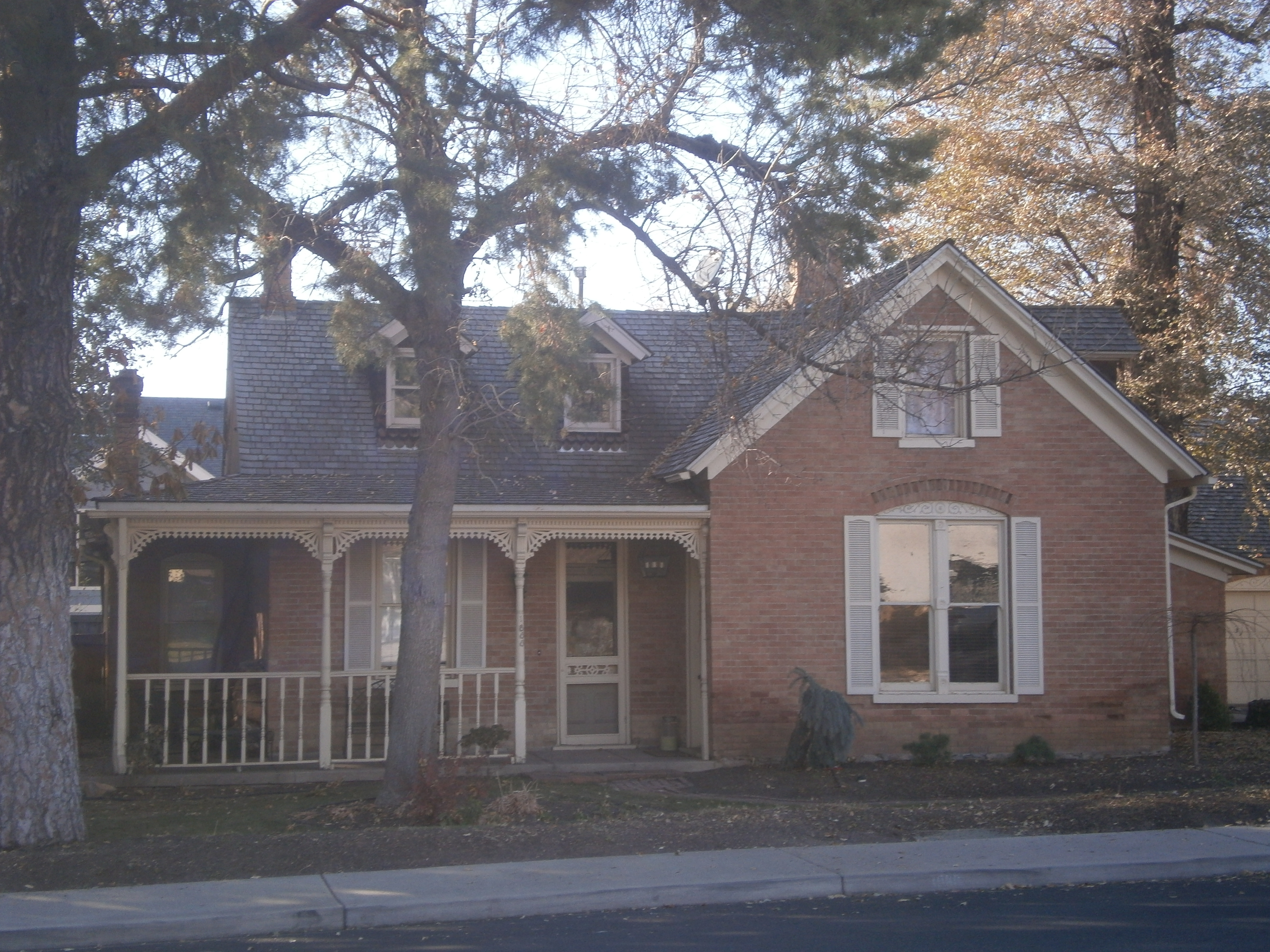

- Location within Utah Location within the United States
- Location: 1888 S. Main St., Orem, Utah
- Coordinates: 40°15′46″N 111°41′39″W
- Area: 0.2 acres (0.081 ha)
- Built: 1892
- Architectural style: Late Victorian
- MPS: Orem, Utah MPS
- NRHP reference No.: 98000642
- Added to NRHP: June 11, 1998

The Joshua Davis House at 1888 S. Main St. in Orem, Utah, United States, was built in 1892. It was listed on the National Register of Historic Places (NRHP) in 1998.

J. Cory Jensen, in its NRHP nomination, wrote:

The Davis house is a good example of the transitional character of the architecture on the Provo Bench at the latter-part of the 19th century. The salmon-colored, soft-fired brick, found on many of the homes in the region, became available on the Provo Bench in the early 1880s which allowed for greater variation in used in Victorian-style architecture. Although Classical in form, the Victorian influence in the architectural details is readily apparent. Because many of the farmers on the bench struggled to make an income for many years, the architecture of their homes remained in the simple, unembellished Classical-style architecture of their predecessors. Those who saw success in their farms began to build or alter their present homes in the Victorian styles, mainly the Victorian Eclectic which enlisted such details as asymmetrical facades, bay windows, arched window and door openings, wooden shingles on the vertical surfaces, decorative brickwork, and leaded-glass windows. The Davis

house combines a Classical house type with many of the Victorian Eclectic features common from 1885-1910.
