= Davis Plantation (Monticello, South Carolina) =

Historic house in South Carolina, United States

- U.S. National Register of Historic Places
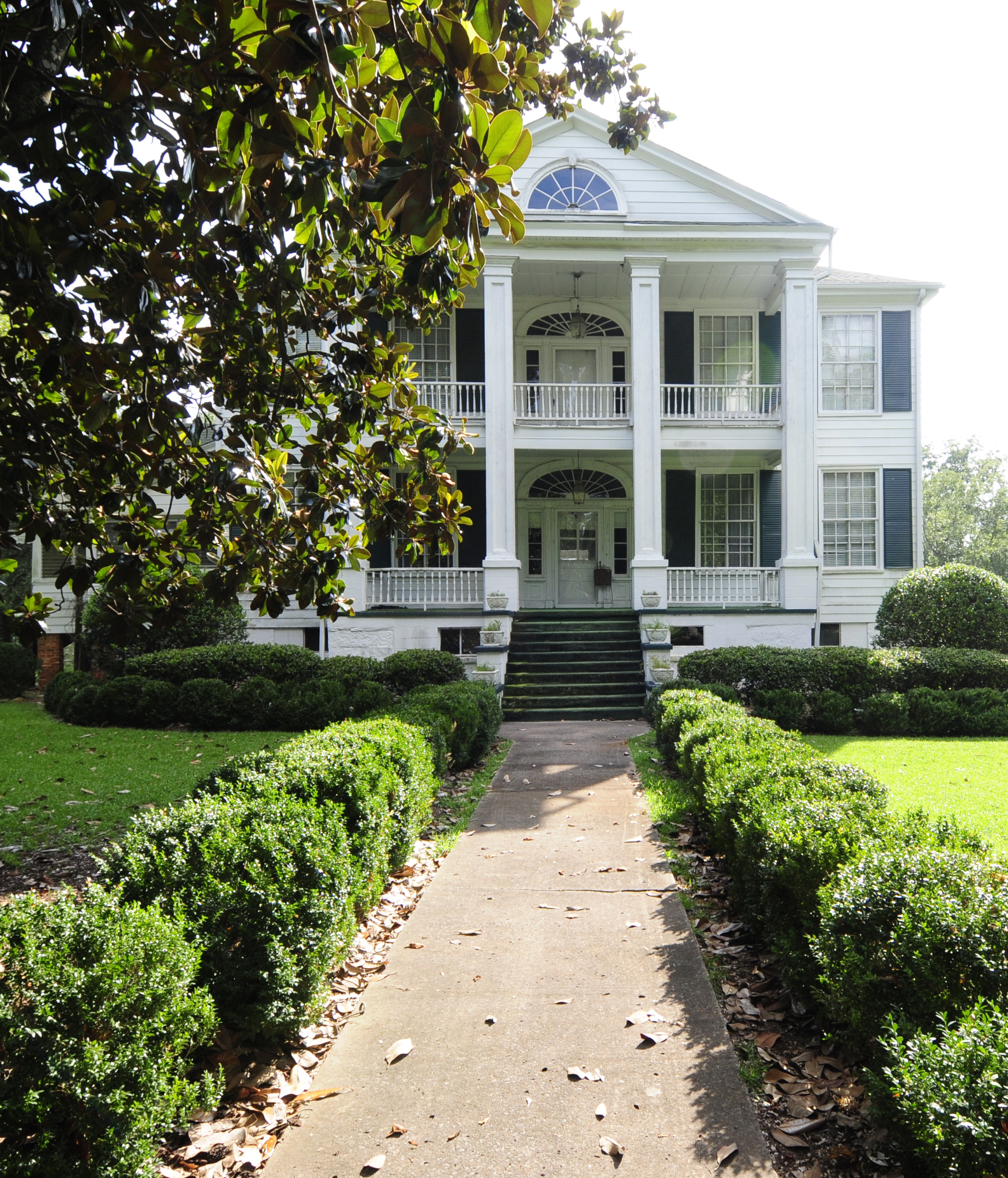
- Davis Plantation, July 2012

- Location within South Carolina Location within the United States
- Location: South of Monticello on South Carolina Highway 215, near Monticello, South Carolina
- Coordinates: 34°22′36″N 81°18′59″W
- Area: 30 acres (12 ha)
- Built: c.1845
- NRHP reference No.: 71000776
- Added to NRHP: May 6, 1971

Davis Plantation is a historic plantation house located near Monticello, Fairfield County, South Carolina.

== History and overview ==
It was built about 1845, and is a two-story, white frame Greek Revival style house. It has a hipped roof and two mammoth chimneys. It features a gabled front portico supported by four square, paneled Doric order columns. The house was built by James B. Davis, descendant of Revolutionary War Captain, James Kincaid, and an early pioneer in South Carolina agricultural development.

== Significance ==
It was added to the National Register of Historic Places in 1971.
