= Phineas Davis Farmstead =

Historic place in New York, United States

- U.S. National Register of Historic Places
- U.S. Historic district
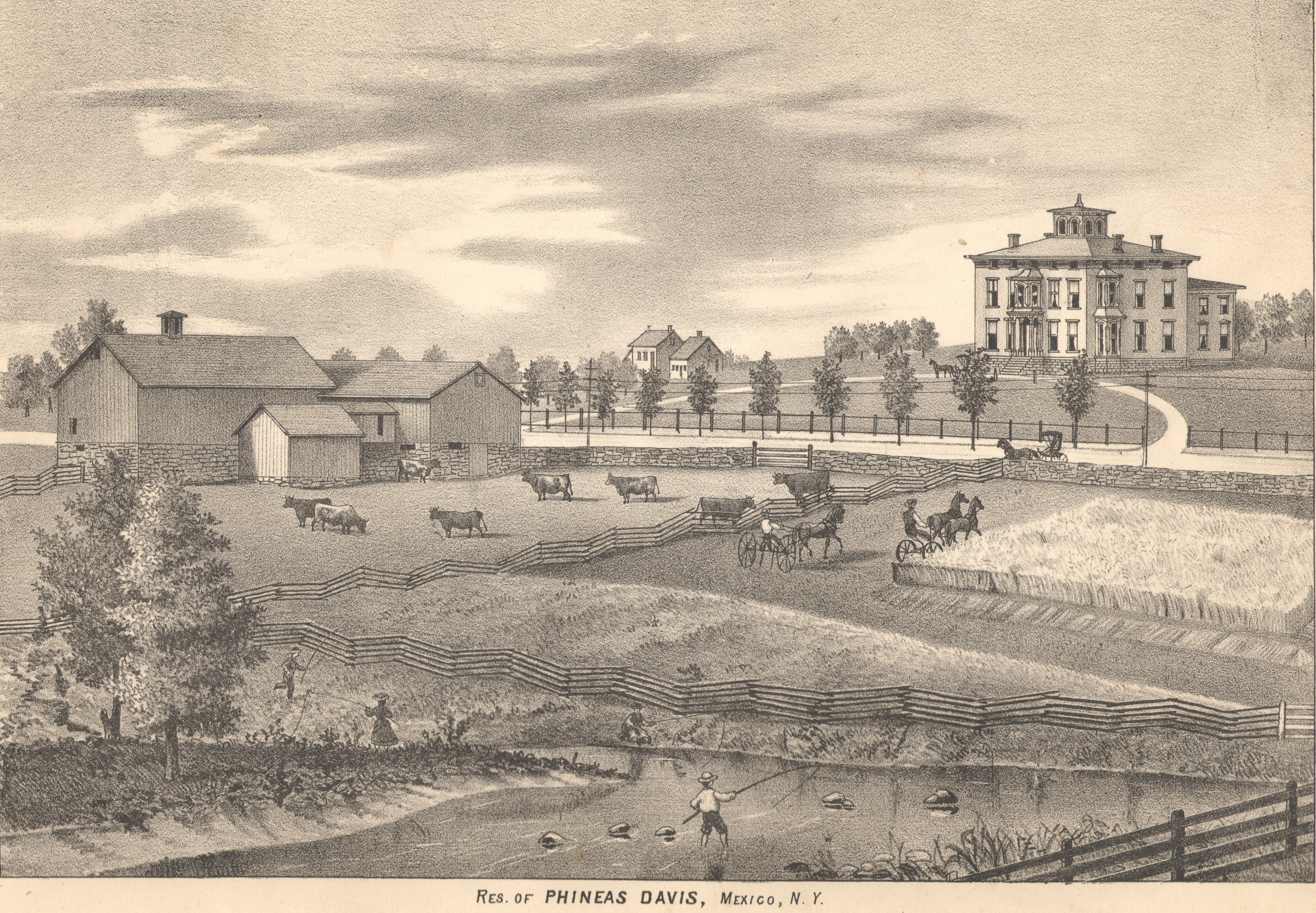

- Location within New York Location within the United States
- Location: 5422 North Rd. Mexico, New York
- Coordinates: 43°27′55″N 76°13′37″W
- Area: 64.2 acres (26.0 ha)
- Built: 1870
- Architect: John Aldrich
- Architectural style: Italianate
- MPS: Mexico MPS
- NRHP reference No.: 91000524
- Added to NRHP: June 20, 1991

Phineas Davis Farmstead is a historic farm complex and national historic district located in the village of Mexico in Oswego County, New York. The district features an Italianate farmhouse built in 1874. Also on the property is a historic henhouse and three stone hitching posts.

It was listed on the National Register of Historic Places in 1991.
