= David Davis Farm =

- U.S. National Register of Historic Places
- U.S. Historic district
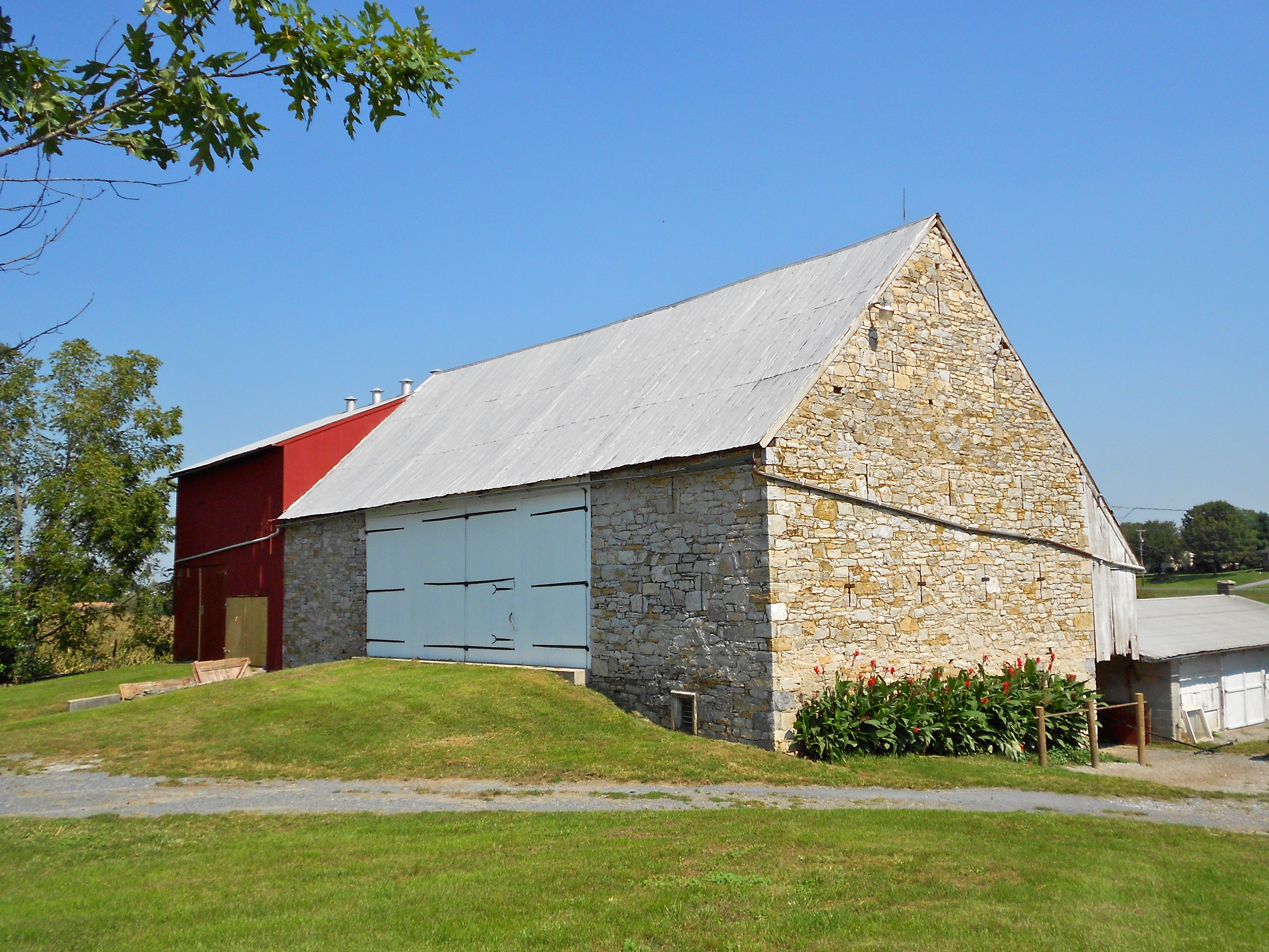
- Stone Bank Barn. September 2012

- Location within Pennsylvania Location within the United States
- Location: 737 Spruce Rd., Earl Township, Pennsylvania
- Coordinates: 40°07′23″N 76°04′46″W
- Area: 79 acres (32 ha)
- Built: c. 1750, c. 1780, 1787
- Architectural style: Pennsylvania-German style
- MPS: Historic Farming Resources of Lancaster County MPS
- NRHP reference No.: 94001060
- Added to NRHP: August 30, 1994

David Davis Farm, also known as the Christian Summers Farm and John Martin Farm, is a historic farm and national historic district located at Earl Township, Lancaster County, Pennsylvania. The district includes seven contributing buildings and one contributing site. They include the farmhouse, a stone bank barn (c. 1780), spring house (c. 1800), two frame tobacco barns, a small frame shed (c. 1940), and family burial ground. The farmhouse is an evolutionary dwelling originally built as a two-story, stone building about 1750, and extensively remodeled in 1787. Stone and frame additions were made about 1815, about 1870, and about 1890. Attached to the house is a small frame summer kitchen with beehive oven, that was once a separate structure.

It was listed on the National Register of Historic Places in 1994.
