= Brown-Davis-Frost Farm =

- U.S. National Register of Historic Places
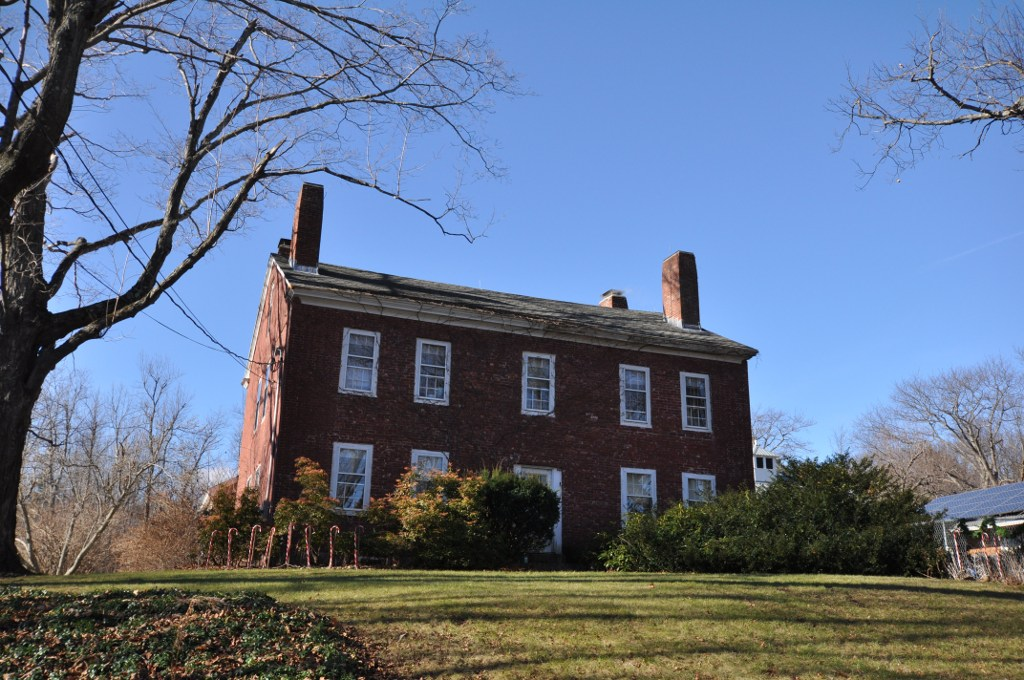

- Location within Massachusetts Location within the United States
- Location: 17 Whitney St., Town of Holden, Jefferson, Massachusetts
- Coordinates: 42.37456°N 71.88626°W
- Area: 50 acres (20 ha)
- Architectural style: Georgian
- NRHP reference No.: 95001444
- Added to NRHP: December 13, 1995

The Brown-Davis-Frost Farm, now called Lantern House Farm, is a historic farm property at 17 Whitney Street in Jefferson, a village of Holden, Massachusetts. It has a history dating to the 18th century, and includes one Holden's oldest brick houses. The property was listed on the National Register of Historic Places in 1995.

== Description and history ==
The Brown-Davis-Frost Farm is located in a rural area of western Holden. The 50-acre (20 ha) property includes pasture and woodland. The farm complex is on the west side of Whitney Street, a short way north of its junction with Princeton Street. The focal point is the farmhouse, a 2 1/2-story brick structure, five bays wide, with a side gable roof, four end chimneys, and a granite foundation. The complex also includes a barn, workshop, and garage, the latter now converted into a kennel, as well as a few smaller structures. The house's main facade is nearly symmetrical, with paired bays on the outside set off from the slightly off-enter central bay, where the entrance is located. There is no significant ornamentation or trim around any of the exterior elements.

The farmhouse is difficult to date because of its vernacular appearance. Local historians believe it may have been built as early as 1763 by Isaiah Brown, and as late as 1795, by Ethan Davis, making it one of the town's few 18th-century brick houses. Brown, a veteran of the American Revolutionary War, sold property to Davis in 1799 that may have included this house, and Davis later sold it to Dana Frost. The farm was, at the time of its listing on the National Register, believed by the then-owner to be the oldest operating farm in Holden.

== See also ==
- Willard-Fisk House, another 18th-century brick house on Whitney Street
- National Register of Historic Places listings in Worcester County, Massachusetts
