= Archibald H. Davis Plantation =

Historic house in North Carolina, United States

- U.S. National Register of Historic Places
- Location within North Carolina Location within the United States
- Location: SE of Louisburg off NC 581, near Justice, North Carolina
- Coordinates: 36°03′12″N 78°11′45″W
- Area: 20 acres (8.1 ha)
- Built: c. 1820
- Architectural style: Greek Revival
- NRHP reference No.: 75001266
- Added to NRHP: July 24, 1975

Archibald H. Davis Plantation, also known as Cypress Hall, is a historic plantation house and complex located near Justice, Franklin County, North Carolina. The house was built about 1820, and is a two-story, five-bay, Greek Revival style frame dwelling. It has a full-width front porch and rear ell added in the early-20th century. Also on the property are log tobacco barns, a small barn, a larger barn, domestic outbuildings, and a building said to have been a trading post or stagecoach stop.

It was listed on the National Register of Historic Places in 1975.
