= Daniel M. Davis House =

Historic house in Georgia, United States

- U.S. National Register of Historic Places
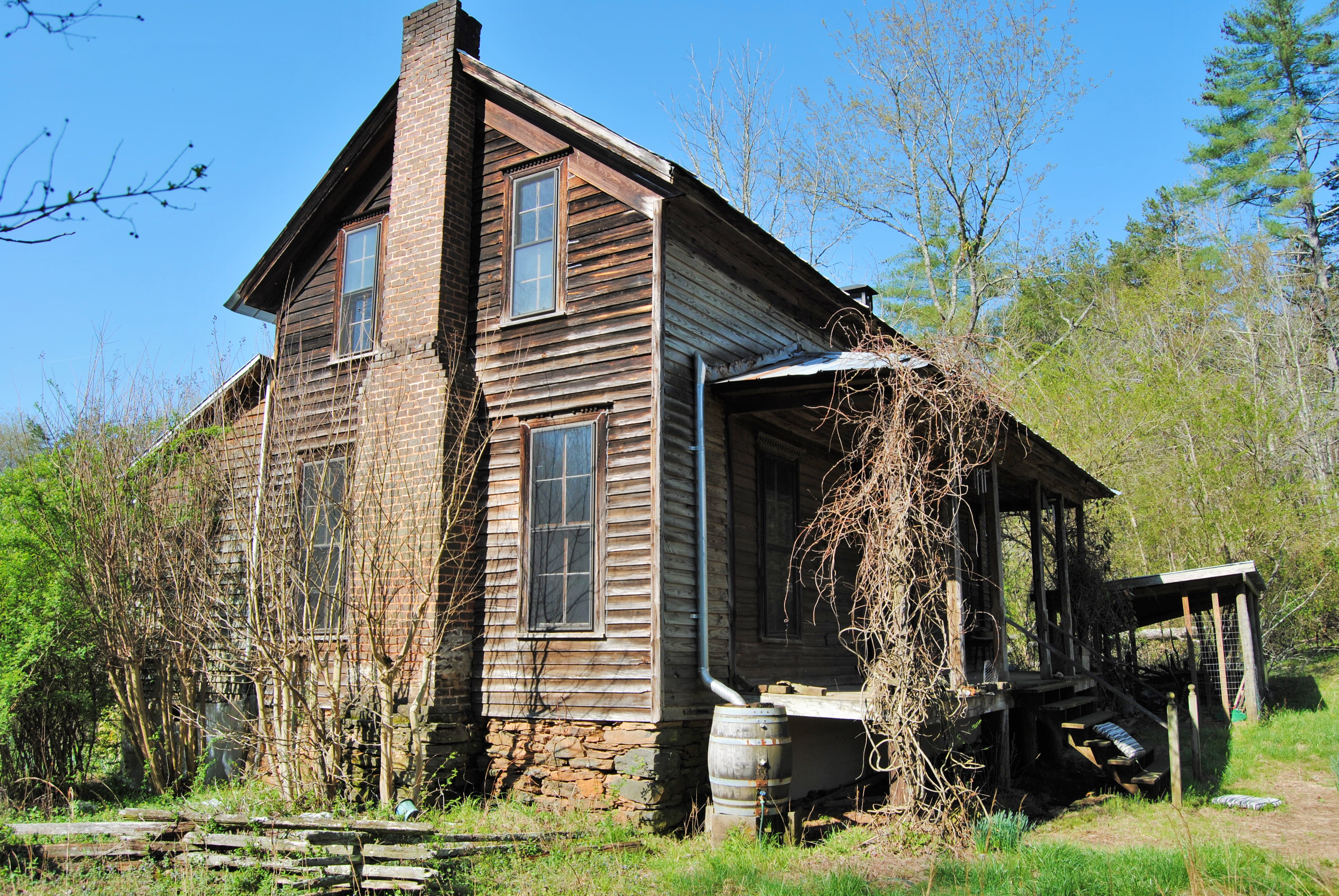
- Daniel M. Davis House, April 2015.

- Location within Georgia Location within the United States
- Location: GA 9, 1.5 miles (2.4 km) southwest of the junction with GA 52, Dahlonega, Georgia
- Coordinates: 34°30′49″N 84°03′51″W
- Area: 23 acres (9.3 ha)
- Built: c. 1880
- NRHP reference No.: 98000227
- Added to NRHP: March 12, 1998

Daniel M. Davis House is a historic building located in Dahlonega, Georgia. It is listed on the National Register of Historic Places.

== About ==
The Daniel M. Davis House is notable due to its association with Daniel Davis, an affluent white male slave owner who married a Cherokee woman, Rachel Martin. Davis was among the wealthiest slave owners living within the Cherokee Nation. On the 1830 United States census, Davis and his family were listed as white and not as free people of color, which is how many mixed-race people were listed on the census at the time. On the 1835 Chapman Roll of the Cherokee Nation, Davis is listed as an intermarried white man living with his family of 10 Cherokees and 23 slaves. Because he was a white man, Davis was not forced to be removed on the Trail of Tears; his Cherokee wife Rachel and their children were not removed either. The Daniel M. Davis House was built around 1880 by Daniel Davis's grandson, Daniel M. Davis.

== See also ==
- Cherokee descent
- Georgia Tribe of Eastern Cherokee
