= Samuel Davis House (Norwich Township, Franklin County, Ohio) =

Historic house in Ohio, United States

- U.S. National Register of Historic Places
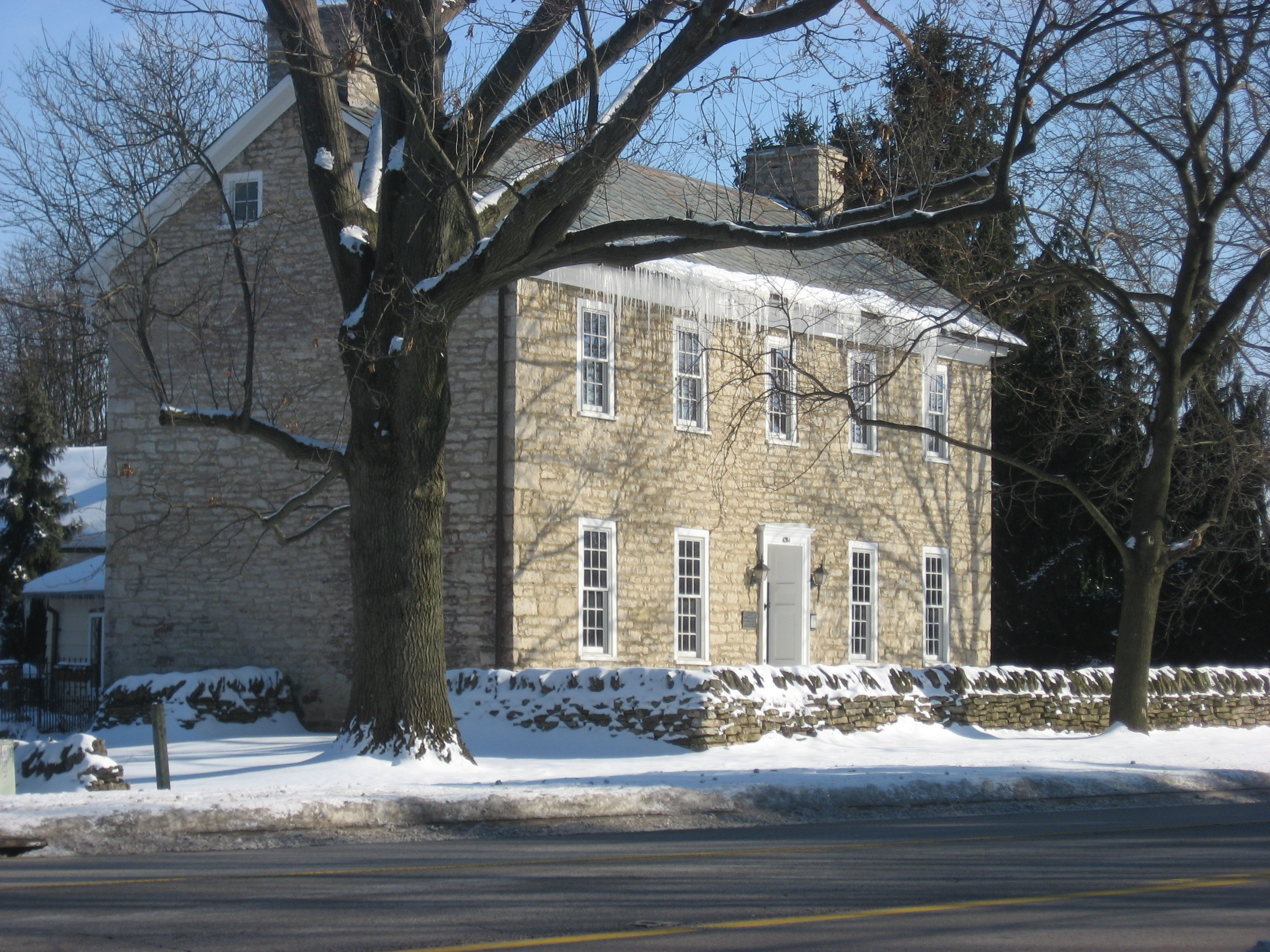
- Front of the house
- Interactive map highlighting the house's location
- Location: 4264 Dublin Road, Columbus, Ohio
- Coordinates: 40°2′44″N 83°6′13″W
- Area: 1.2 acres (0.49 ha)
- Built: 1816
- Architect: Samuel Davis
- Architectural style: Federal
- NRHP reference No.: 74001488
- Added to NRHP: February 15, 1974

The Samuel Davis House is a historic farmhouse located near Columbus and Dublin in Norwich Township, Franklin County, Ohio, United States. Built in 1815, it is one of the county's older buildings and served as the home of pioneer settler Samuel Davis, who was notable for his service in the American Revolution and subsequent frontier exploits. The house has been named a historic site.

Samuel Davis was born in Litchfield, Connecticut in 1763After completing an apprenticeship as a silversmith, he joined the Continental Army, fighting in the American Revolution. Following the end of the war, he travelled west to Kentucky County, Virginia, where he traded silver goods with Native Americans and encountered well-known frontiersmen like Daniel Boone, Nathaniel Massie, and Simon Kenton. He later served as a scout for a military group called Mason County Spy Company, which was formed under the leadership of Simon Kenton and General Charles Scott.

In 1814, Davis purchased a property in what is now Franklin County, Ohio, from a resident of Highland County. The following year, he built his house on this land. Davis' house is a simple rectangular building constructed of simple stonework. Little craftsmanship was expended on the house; the only dressed stone in the walls, for example, is found on the quoins. The stone for the house came from Davis' own property; large amounts of stone were necessary, as the building's walls are 18 inches (460 mm) thick. Built in the Federal style, it is the oldest stone house still standing in Franklin County.

The house was added to the National Register of Historic Places in 1974, recognized for its architectural significance. It is part of a collection of National Register-listed properties located along Dublin Road, in and near the city of Dublin.
