= Daniel Davis House and Barn =

Historic house in Pennsylvania, United States

- U.S. National Register of Historic Places
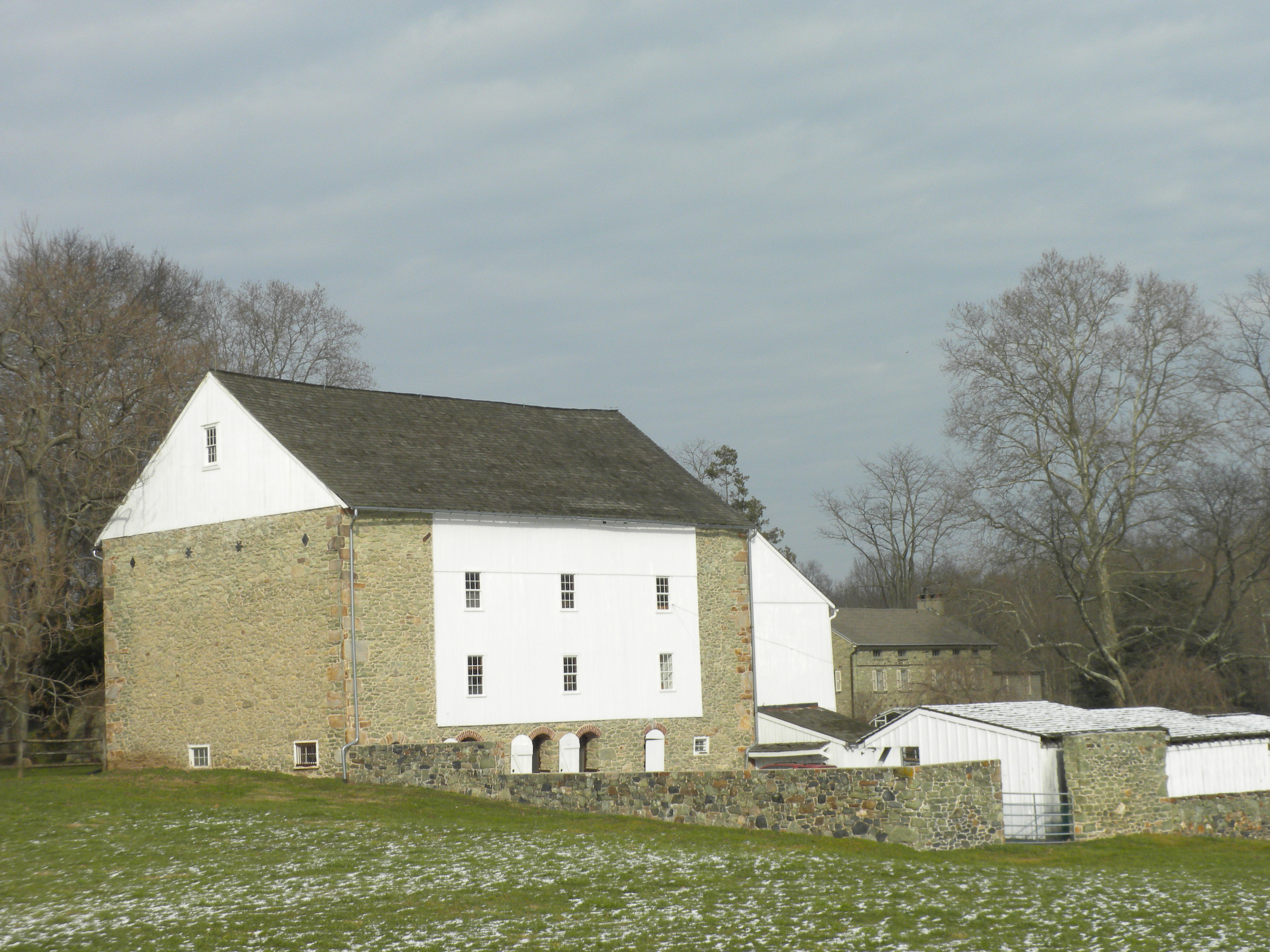
- Davis Barn and House, December 2009

- Location within Pennsylvania Location within the United States
- Location: Birmingham and Street Road, Birmingham Township, Pennsylvania
- Coordinates: 39°54′47″N 75°36′00″W
- Area: 49.9 acres (20.2 ha)
- Built: 1740
- Built by: Davis, Daniel
- NRHP reference No.: 73001598
- Added to NRHP: April 11, 1973

Daniel Davis House and Barn, also known as Fair Meadow, is a historic home and barn located in Birmingham Township, Chester County, Pennsylvania. The serpentine core of the house was built in 1740. It is a 2 1/2-story, three-bay, double-pile dwelling with a gable roof. It has a 2 1/2-story, three-bay wing with a gable roof and a frame addition constructed in 1935. The barn is also constructed of serpentine and is a bank barn structure.

It was added to the National Register of Historic Places in 1973.
