= National Register of Historic Places listings in Fairfield County, South Carolina =

Location of Fairfield County in South Carolina

This is a list of the National Register of Historic Places listings in Fairfield County, South Carolina.

This is intended to be a complete list of the properties and districts on the National Register of Historic Places in Fairfield County, South Carolina, United States. The locations of National Register properties and districts for which the latitude and longitude coordinates are included below, may be seen in a map.

There are 44 properties and districts listed on the National Register in the county. Another 2 properties were once listed but have been removed.

This National Park Service list is complete through NPS recent listings posted May 1, 2026.

== Current listings ==
| | Name on the Register | Image | Date listed | Location | City or town | Description |
|---|---|---|---|---|---|---|
| 1 | Albion | Albion | December 6, 1984 (#84000592) | West of Winnsboro off South Carolina Highway 34; 34°27′22″N 81°14′36″W | Winnsboro | |
| 2 | Balwearie | Balwearie | December 6, 1984 (#84000593) | West of Winnsboro on South Carolina Highway 34; 34°27′14″N 81°14′41″W | Winnsboro | |
| 3 | Blair Mound | | August 23, 1974 (#74001853) | Address Restricted | Winnsboro | |
| 4 | Blink Bonnie | Blink Bonnie | April 13, 1972 (#72001209) | About 10 miles northeast of Ridgeway; 34°20′15″N 80°49′14″W | Ridgeway | |
| 5 | Dr. Walter Brice House and Office | Dr. Walter Brice House and Office | December 6, 1984 (#84000594) | Northwest of Winnsboro; 34°30′17″N 81°14′40″W | Winnsboro | |
| 6 | Camp Welfare | Camp Welfare | December 6, 1984 (#84000586) | Off U.S. Route 21; 34°29′23″N 80°57′04″W | Ridgeway | |
| 7 | Century House | Century House | August 19, 1971 (#71000777) | South Carolina Highway 34; 34°18′13″N 80°57′30″W | Ridgeway | |
| 8 | Concord Presbyterian Church | Concord Presbyterian Church | December 6, 1984 (#84000598) | U.S. Route 321; 34°31′27″N 81°10′10″W | Winnsboro | |
| 9 | Davis Plantation | Davis Plantation | May 6, 1971 (#71000776) | South of Monticello on South Carolina Highway 215; 34°22′36″N 81°18′59″W | Monticello | |
| 10 | Ebenezer Associate Reformed Presbyterian Church | Ebenezer Associate Reformed Presbyterian Church | August 19, 1971 (#71000775) | 4.3 miles north of Jenkinsville on South Carolina Highway 213; 34°19′09″N 81°15′39″W | Jenkinsville | Also known as First ARP Church or "Old Brick Church." Built in 1788. |
| 11 | Fairfield County Memorial Hospital | | January 26, 2026 (#100012629) | 102 US-321 Bypass; 34°22′20″N 81°06′03″W | Winnsboro | |
| 12 | Fonti Flora Plantation | Fonti Flora Plantation | April 24, 1979 (#79002382) | 5.4 miles northeast of Monticello on South Carolina Highway 99; 34°24′06″N 81°20′45″W | Monticello | |
| 13 | Furman Institution Faculty Residence | Furman Institution Faculty Residence | December 6, 1984 (#84000601) | Southwest of Winnsboro; 34°20′53″N 81°07′23″W | Winnsboro | |
| 14 | Dr. John Glenn House | Dr. John Glenn House | December 6, 1984 (#84000572) | South Carolina Highway 215; 34°14′51″N 81°15′06″W | Jenkinsville | |
| 15 | High Point | High Point | December 6, 1984 (#84000576) | South Carolina Highway 215; 34°14′47″N 81°14′56″W | Jenkinsville | |
| 16 | Hunstanton | Hunstanton | December 6, 1984 (#84000604) | U.S. Route 321; 34°21′06″N 81°05′11″W | Winnsboro | |
| 17 | Hunter House | | December 6, 1984 (#84000588) | Northeast of Ridgeway; 34°19′27″N 80°56′05″W | Ridgeway | |
| 18 | Ketchin Building | Ketchin Building | December 18, 1970 (#70000588) | 231 S. Congress St. 34°22′33″N 81°05′08″W | Winnsboro | |
| 19 | Kincaid-Anderson House | Kincaid-Anderson House | July 30, 1974 (#74001852) | Northeast of Jenkinsville off South Carolina Highway 213; 34°19′10″N 81°14′32″W | Jenkinsville | |
| 20 | Bob Lemmon House | | December 6, 1984 (#84000607) | Off South Carolina Highway 213; 34°19′44″N 81°10′33″W | Winnsboro | |
| 21 | Liberty Universalist Church and Feasterville Academy Historic District | Liberty Universalist Church and Feasterville Academy Historic District | December 6, 1984 (#84000612) | South Carolina Highway 215; 34°30′13″N 81°21′36″W | Winnsboro | |
| 22 | Little River Baptist Church | Little River Baptist Church | April 13, 1972 (#72001208) | 3.8 miles north of Jenkinsville on South Carolina Highway 213; 34°18′38″N 81°16′31″W | Jenkinsville | |
| 23 | Mayfair | | February 6, 1985 (#85000246) | Off South Carolina Highway 215; 34°15′42″N 81°17′34″W | Jenkinsville | |
| 24 | McMeekin Rock Shelter | | August 23, 1974 (#74001854) | Address Restricted | Winnsboro | |
| 25 | Monticello Methodist Church | Monticello Methodist Church | December 6, 1984 (#84000578) | Off South Carolina Highway 215; 34°20′59″N 81°17′57″W | Monticello | |
| 26 | Monticello Store and Post Office | Monticello Store and Post Office | December 6, 1984 (#84000584) | Off South Carolina Highway 215; 34°21′11″N 81°17′58″W | Monticello | |
| 27 | Mount Hope | | December 6, 1984 (#84000589) | South Carolina Highway 34; 34°17′58″N 80°59′18″W | Ridgeway | |
| 28 | Mount Olivet Presbyterian Church | Mount Olivet Presbyterian Church | August 13, 1986 (#86001523) | Off South Carolina Highway 200; 34°27′55″N 81°02′02″W | Winnsboro | |
| 29 | Mt. Zion Institute High School | Mt. Zion Institute High School | September 30, 2019 (#100004445) | 250 N. Walnut St. 34°23′02″N 81°05′02″W | Winnsboro | |
| 30 | New Hope A.R.P. Church and Session House | New Hope A.R.P. Church and Session House | December 6, 1984 (#84000652) | Northwest of Winnsboro; 34°30′33″N 81°14′47″W | Winnsboro | |
| 31 | Old Stone House | Old Stone House | December 6, 1984 (#84000614) | Off South Carolina Highway 34; 34°23′48″N 81°11′53″W | Winnsboro | |
| 32 | Ridgeway Historic District | Ridgeway Historic District | November 25, 1980 (#80004466) | U.S. Route 21 and South Carolina Highway 34; 34°18′26″N 80°57′39″W | Ridgeway | |
| 33 | Rockton and Rion Railroad Historic District | Rockton and Rion Railroad Historic District | December 6, 1984 (#84000617) | South of Winnsboro from South Carolina Highway 34 west to South Carolina Highway 213; 34°19′09″N 81°09′19″W | Winnsboro | |
| 34 | Ruff's Chapel | Ruff's Chapel | November 25, 1980 (#80004400) | U.S. Route 21 and South Carolina Highway 34; 34°18′15″N 80°57′28″W | Ridgeway | |
| 35 | Rural Point | Rural Point | February 23, 1972 (#72001210) | Old Camden Rd. 34°21′57″N 81°04′36″W | Winnsboro | |
| 36 | St. Stephen's Episcopal Church | St. Stephen's Episcopal Church | May 6, 1971 (#71000778) | Northeast of Ridgeway on County Road 106; 34°18′42″N 80°57′23″W | Ridgeway | An 1854 Carpenter Gothic building which in 1920 had its wooden exterior veneered with brick. The Rev. William Porcher DuBose was an early rector. |
| 37 | Shivar Springs Bottling Company Cisterns | Shivar Springs Bottling Company Cisterns | December 6, 1984 (#84000622) | West of Winnsboro; 34°29′19″N 81°25′15″W | Winnsboro | |
| 38 | The Oaks | The Oaks | December 6, 1984 (#84000624) | South Carolina Highway 213; 34°21′15″N 81°10′44″W | Winnsboro | |
| 39 | Tocaland | Tocaland | December 6, 1984 (#84000627) | Off South Carolina Highway 34; 34°20′26″N 81°04′18″W | Winnsboro | |
| 40 | Valencia | Valencia | May 6, 1971 (#71000779) | Northwest of Ridgeway on County Road 106; 34°19′40″N 80°59′00″W | Ridgeway | |
| 41 | Vaughn's Stage Coach Stop | Vaughn's Stage Coach Stop | December 6, 1984 (#84000591) | South Carolina Highway 34; 34°18′36″N 81°02′00″W | Ridgeway | |
| 42 | White Oak Historic District | White Oak Historic District | December 6, 1984 (#84000631) | Off U.S. Route 321; 34°28′26″N 81°07′02″W | Winnsboro | |
| 43 | Monroe Wilson House | Monroe Wilson House | November 25, 1980 (#80004467) | Railroad Ave. and Secondary Route S20-20; 34°18′30″N 80°57′54″W | Ridgeway | |
| 44 | Winnsboro Historic District | Winnsboro Historic District | October 14, 1971 (#71000780) | Roughly bounded by Gooding, Buchanan, Garden, and Fairfield Sts. 34°22′50″N 81°05′11″W | Winnsboro | |

== Former listings ==
| | Name on the Register | Image | Date listed | Date removed | Location | City or town | Description |
|---|---|---|---|---|---|---|---|
| 1 | James Beard House | | December 6, 1984 (#84000585) | December 8, 2005 | County Road 48, about 2 mi from County Road 294 | Ridgeway | Demolished |
| 2 | Furman Institution Academic Building | | December 6, 1984 (#84000600) | December 8, 2005 | South Carolina Highway 213 and County Roads 70 & 23 | Winnsboro | Demolished |

== See also ==
- List of National Historic Landmarks in South Carolina
- National Register of Historic Places listings in South Carolina
