= Hunstanton (disambiguation) =

Hunstanton is a town in Norfolk, England.

Hunstanton may also refer to:

- Old Hunstanton, a village in Norfolk, England, from which the newer town derives its name
- New Hunstanton, an alternative name for Hunstanton, Norfolk
- Hunstanton (Winnsboro, South Carolina), listed on the NRHP in Fairfield County, South Carolina
