= Catherine Ladd =

Catherine Ladd may refer to:

- Catherine Stratton Ladd (1808–1899), writer, poet, teacher, school founder, and president of Soldiers' Aid Association
- Catherine Everit Macy Ladd, known as Kate Macy Ladd (1863–1945), American philanthropist
