= Concord Presbyterian Church =

Concord Presbyterian Church may refer to:

- Concord Presbyterian Church (Kentucky); see John Fowler (politician)
- Concord Presbyterian Church (North Carolina), a congregation near Statesville
- Concord Presbyterian Church (South Carolina), a church building near Winnsboro, Fairfield County
