= Fonti (disambiguation) =

Fonti may refer to:

- Fonti, a settlement of Bognanco, a commune in the Province of Verbano-Cusio-Ossola, Piedmont, Italy
- Acquaviva delle Fonti, a town and comune of the Metropolitan City of Bari, Apulia, southern Italy
- Fonti Flora Plantation, a historic plantation house located near Monticello, Fairfield County, South Carolina
- Pejo Fonti, a comune (municipality) in the region of Trentino-Alto Adige, Italy
- Francesco Fonti (1948–2012), Italian criminal and member of the 'Ndrangheta
- Samantha Fonti (born 1973), Australian film composer and classically trained violinist
