= Winnsboro Historic District =

Historic district in South Carolina, United States

- U.S. National Register of Historic Places
- U.S. Historic district
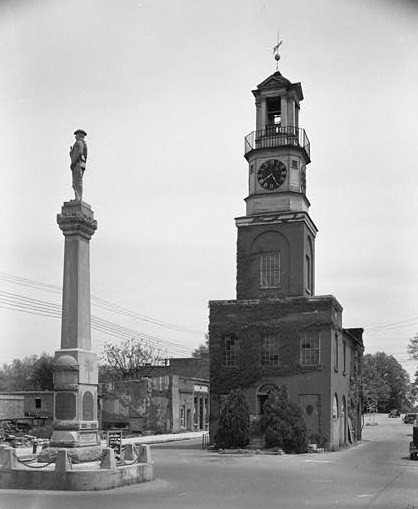
- Fire Station & Municipal Offices, Winnsboro

- Location within South Carolina Location within the United States
- Location: Roughly bounded by Gooding, Buchanan, Garden, and Fairfield Sts., Winnsboro, South Carolina
- Coordinates: 34°22′50″N 81°05′11″W
- Area: 273 acres (110 ha)
- Built: 1785
- Architect: Mills, Robert; Et al.
- Architectural style: Mixed (more Than 2 Styles From Different Periods), Greek Revival
- NRHP reference No.: 71000780
- Added to NRHP: October 14, 1971

Winnsboro Historic District is a national historic district located at Winnsboro, Fairfield County, South Carolina. The district encompasses 33 contributing buildings and one contributing site in the county seat of Winnsboro. The district features a wide range of architectural styles, from early simple frame houses that reflect utilitarian aspects of the Scotch-Irish, the first principal settlers, to pronounced styles such as Federal and Greek Revival. Many residences are typical upcountry frame houses, built in an L-shape with long piazzas running across the front. Notable buildings include the Town Clock, Fairfield County Courthouse, Thespian Hall, Fairfield Country Club, Mt. Zion Elementary, the separately listed Ketchin Building, Beatty House, Wolfe House, Kirkpatrick House, Neil House, and Williford House / Town Hall. The Fairfield Country Club was built in 1822 under the supervision of Robert Mills.

It was listed on the National Register of Historic Places in 1971.
