= Old Stone House (Winnsboro, South Carolina) =

Historic house in South Carolina, United States

- U.S. National Register of Historic Places
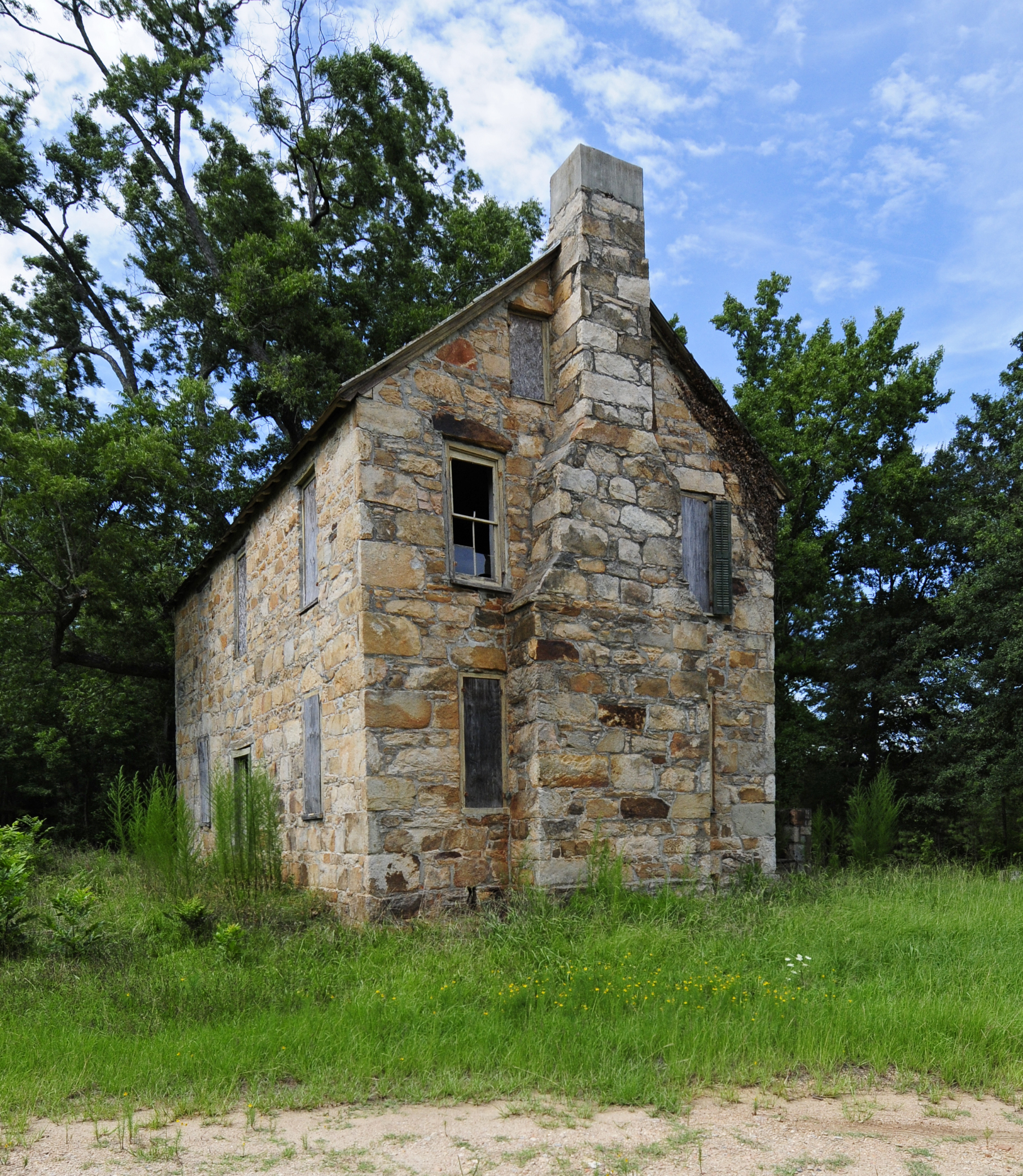
- Old Stone House, July 2012

- Location within South Carolina Location within the United States
- Location: Off South Carolina Highway 34, near Winnsboro, South Carolina
- Coordinates: 34°23′48″N 81°11′53″W
- Area: 0.8 acres (0.32 ha)
- Built: 1784
- Built by: Gladney, Samuel
- MPS: Fairfield County MRA
- NRHP reference No.: 84000614
- Added to NRHP: December 6, 1984

Old Stone House is a historic home located near Winnsboro, Fairfield County, South Carolina. It was built in 1784, and is a two-story, side-gable roofed, stone building, with a double-pile floor plan and stone end chimneys. The façade has a central door with a massive stone lintel flanked by single four-over-four windows with stone lintels. It was built by Samuel Gladney (ca. 1740–1800) and in 1870 it was purchased by the Lebanon Presbyterian Church for use as a parsonage.

It was added to the National Register of Historic Places in 1984.
