= Shivar Springs Bottling Company Cisterns =

- U.S. National Register of Historic Places
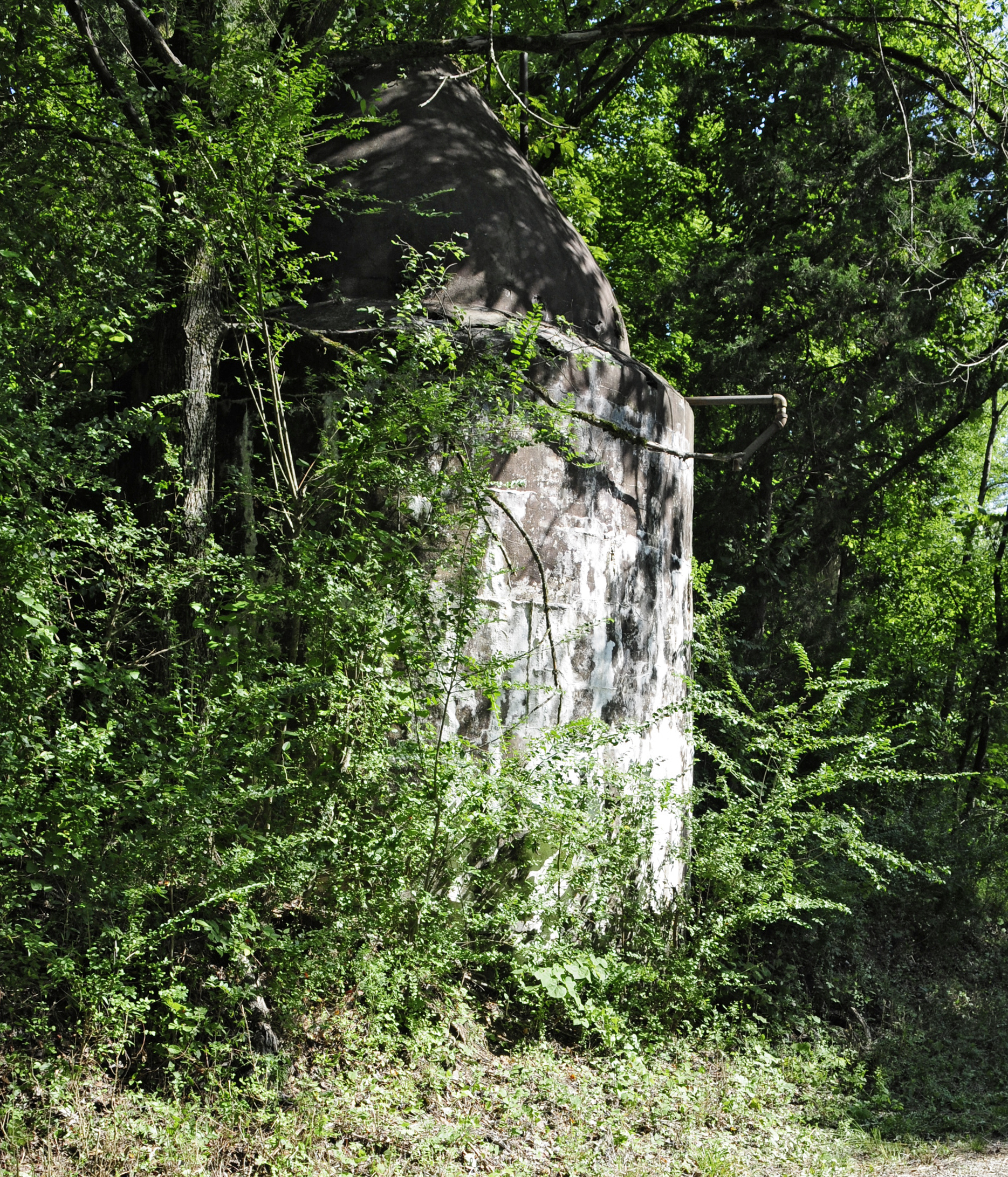
- Shivar Springs Bottling Company Cistern, July 2012

- Location within South Carolina Location within the United States
- Location: West of Winnsboro, near Winnsboro, South Carolina
- Coordinates: 34°29′19″N 81°25′15″W
- Area: 0.2 acres (0.081 ha)
- Built: c. 1900
- MPS: Fairfield County MRA
- NRHP reference No.: 84000622
- Added to NRHP: December 6, 1984; 41 years ago

Shivar Springs Bottling Company Cisterns is a set of six historic cisterns located near Winnsboro, Fairfield County, South Carolina. They were built about 1900, and are a group of six cylindrical, stuccoed stone cisterns with concrete domes. The Shivar Springs Bottling Company was in operation from about 1900 to about 1950. At first the company produced only mineral water which was sold for medicinal purposes. Later both mineral water and soft drinks were produced from the spring water and shipped throughout the state.

It was added to the National Register of Historic Places in 1984.
