= New Hope A.R.P. Church and Session House =

Historic church in South Carolina, United States

- U.S. National Register of Historic Places
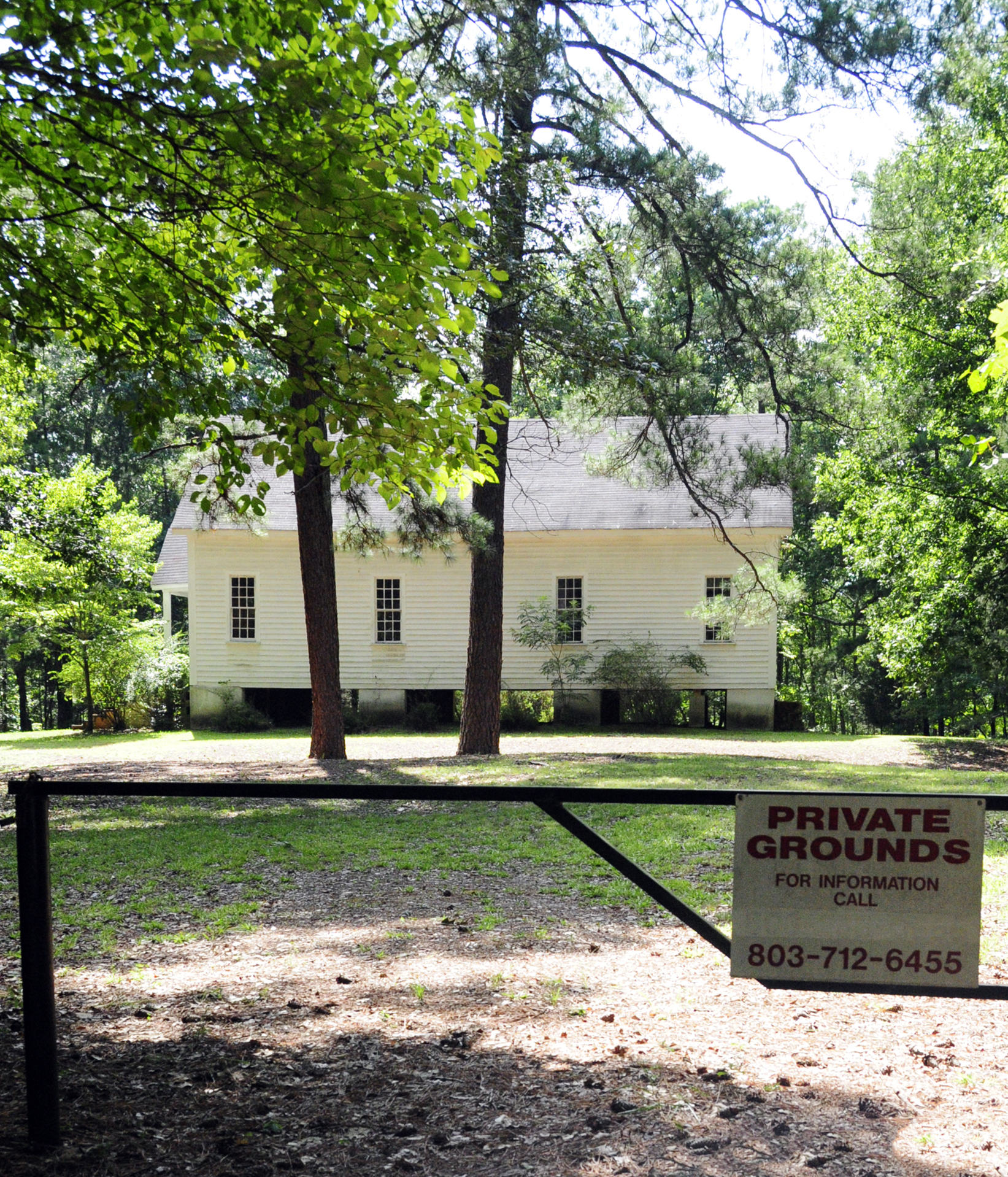

- Location within South Carolina Location within the United States
- Location: Northwest of Winnsboro, near Winnsboro, South Carolina
- Coordinates: 34°30′33″N 81°14′47″W
- Area: 2.3 acres (0.93 ha)
- Built: 1886
- Architect: UNKNOWN
- MPS: Fairfield County MRA
- NRHP reference No.: 84000652
- Added to NRHP: December 06, 1984

New Hope A.R.P. Church and Session House is a historic Associate Reformed Presbyterian Church building and Session House located near Winnsboro, Fairfield County, South Carolina. They were built about 1886. The meeting house form church is a one-story, weatherboarded, frame church. It features a bracketed belfry with a bellcast roof. The session house is a 10 by 12 foot weatherboarded frame building with a gable roof.

It was added to the National Register of Historic Places in 1984.
