= McMeekin Rock Shelter =

Archaeological site in South Carolina, United States

- U.S. National Register of Historic Places
- Nearest city: Winnsboro, South Carolina
- Area: less than one acre
- NRHP reference No.: 74001854
- Added to NRHP: August 23, 1974

McMeekin Rock Shelter is a historic archaeological site located near Winnsboro, Fairfield County, South Carolina. The McMeekin Rock Shelter is formed by a granite outcrop of the south bank of a small tributary drainage of Frees Creek. The overhang of the outcrop is roughly one meter above present ground surface and shelters about 10 square meters of surface area. It is believed that a number of short-term occupations occurred at the site from ca. A.D. 1200 to ca. A.D. 1400.

It was added to the National Register of Historic Places in 1974.
