= Furman Institution Faculty Residence =

- U.S. National Register of Historic Places
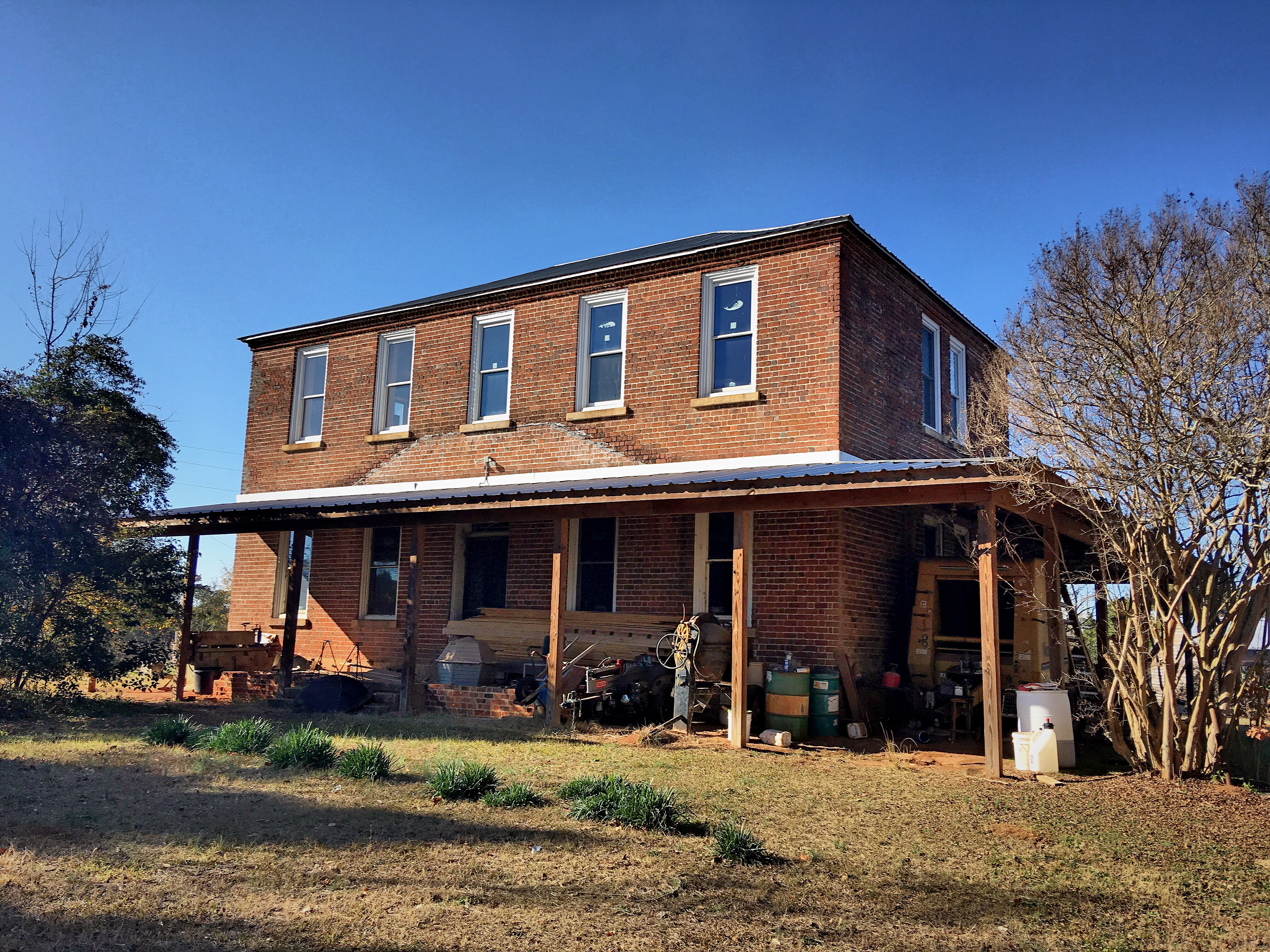

- Location within South Carolina Location within the United States
- Location: Southwest of Winnsboro, near Winnsboro, South Carolina
- Coordinates: 34°20′53″N 81°7′23″W
- Area: 1 acre (0.40 ha)
- Built: c. 1837
- MPS: Fairfield County MRA
- NRHP reference No.: 84000601
- Added to NRHP: December 6, 1984

Furman Institution Faculty Residence is a historic residential building located near Winnsboro, Fairfield County, South Carolina. It was built about 1837, and is a two-story, brick building with a hipped roof and end chimneys. It has a single story, hip roofed front porch (c. 1936) and a kitchen extension (c 1925). The building serves as a visible reminder of the early history of Furman University and its brief establishment in Fairfield County.

It was added to the National Register of Historic Places in 1984.
