= Rockton and Rion Railroad Historic District =

Historic district in South Carolina, United States

- U.S. National Register of Historic Places
- U.S. Historic district
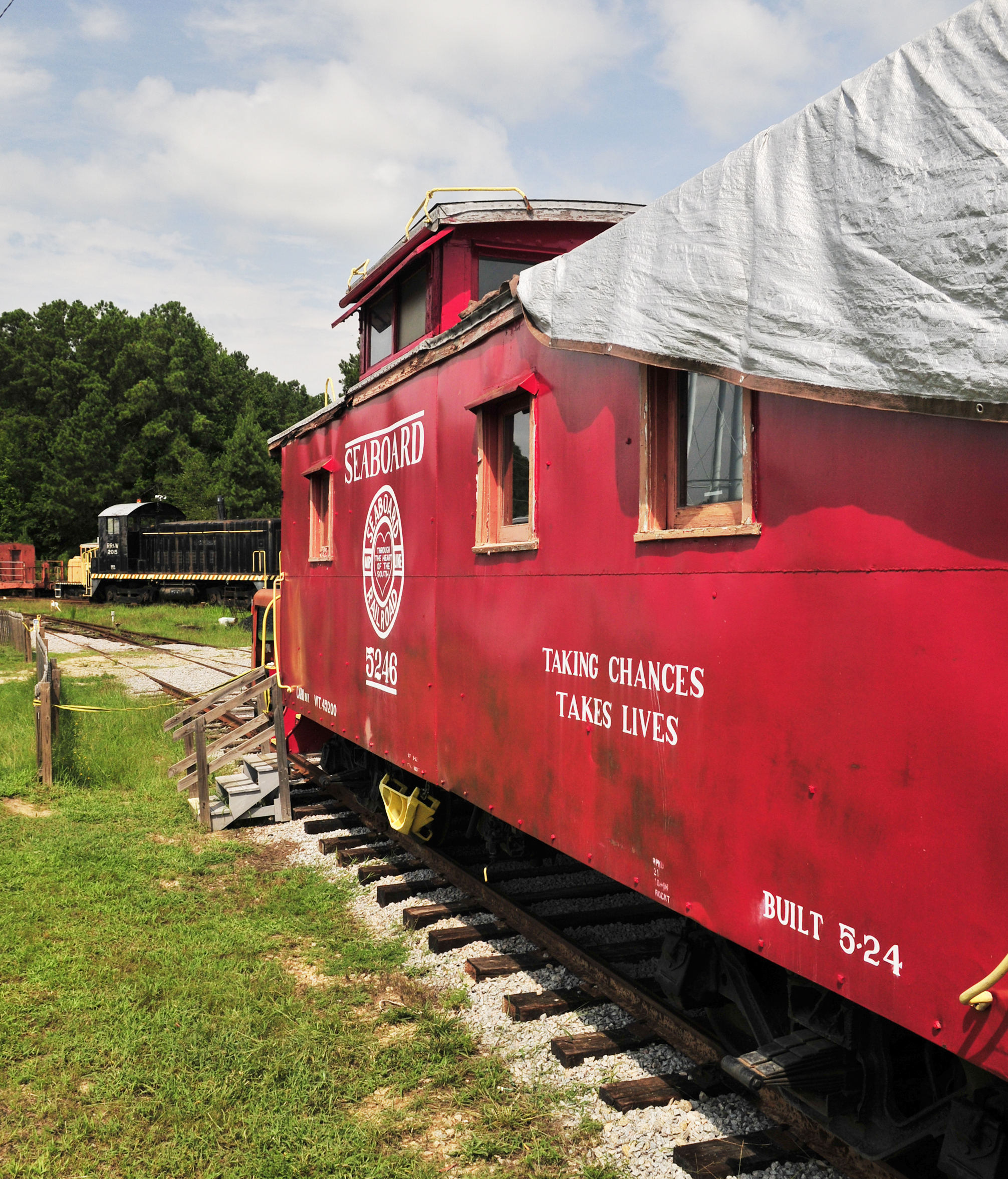
- Rockton and Rion Railroad Historic District, July 2012

- Location within South Carolina Location within the United States
- Location: South of Winnsboro from South Carolina Highway 34 west to South Carolina Highway 213, near Winnsboro, South Carolina
- Coordinates: 34°19′09″N 81°09′19″W
- Area: 150 acres (61 ha)
- Built: c. 1883-1945
- MPS: Fairfield County MRA
- NRHP reference No.: 84000617
- Added to NRHP: December 6, 1984

Rockton and Rion Railroad Historic District is a national historic district located near Winnsboro, Fairfield County, South Carolina, United States. The district encompasses forty contributing buildings, six contributing structures, and two contributing objects associated with the quarrying, finishing, and transporting of Winnsboro blue granite. The district resources were built between about 1883 and about 1945.

The district includes the Anderson and Rion Quarry sites, industrial buildings and structures associated with granite quarrying and finishing operations, residences constructed for management personnel at Anderson Quarry, the Rockton and Rion Railroad line and side tracks, two steam locomotives from the Rockton and Rion Railroad, and a ca. 1941 school building constructed of granite. They are grouped into two complexes, the Anderson Quarry-Phillips Granite Works and the Rion Granite Quarry-Brooks Granite Company.

Most of the buildings and structures in the Historic District were constructed of Winnsboro blue granite, with the majority constructed from the late 1920s to the late 1930s.

It was listed on the National Register of Historic Places in 1984.

The entire Rockton and Rion Railway right-of-way was donated to the South Carolina Railroad Museum (SCRM) by then-owners Martin Marietta Materials in October 1983. The SCRM currently operates several museum buildings open to the public free of charge 5 days a week and runs regularly scheduled scenic tour trains. (edit: GT Mills 9/19/25)

== Historical Photographs ==
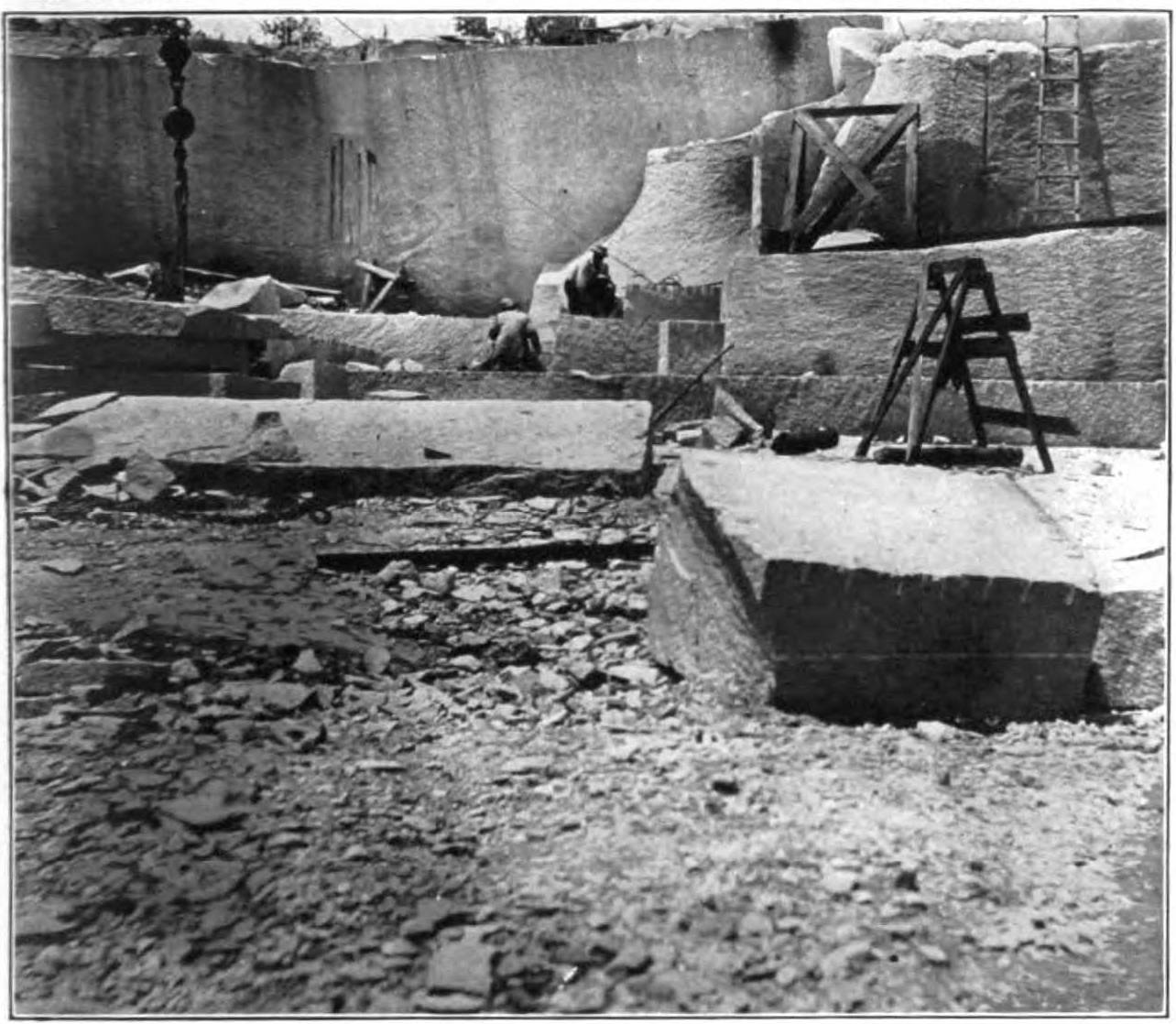
Rion Quarry of Winsboro Granite Corporation, c. 1908

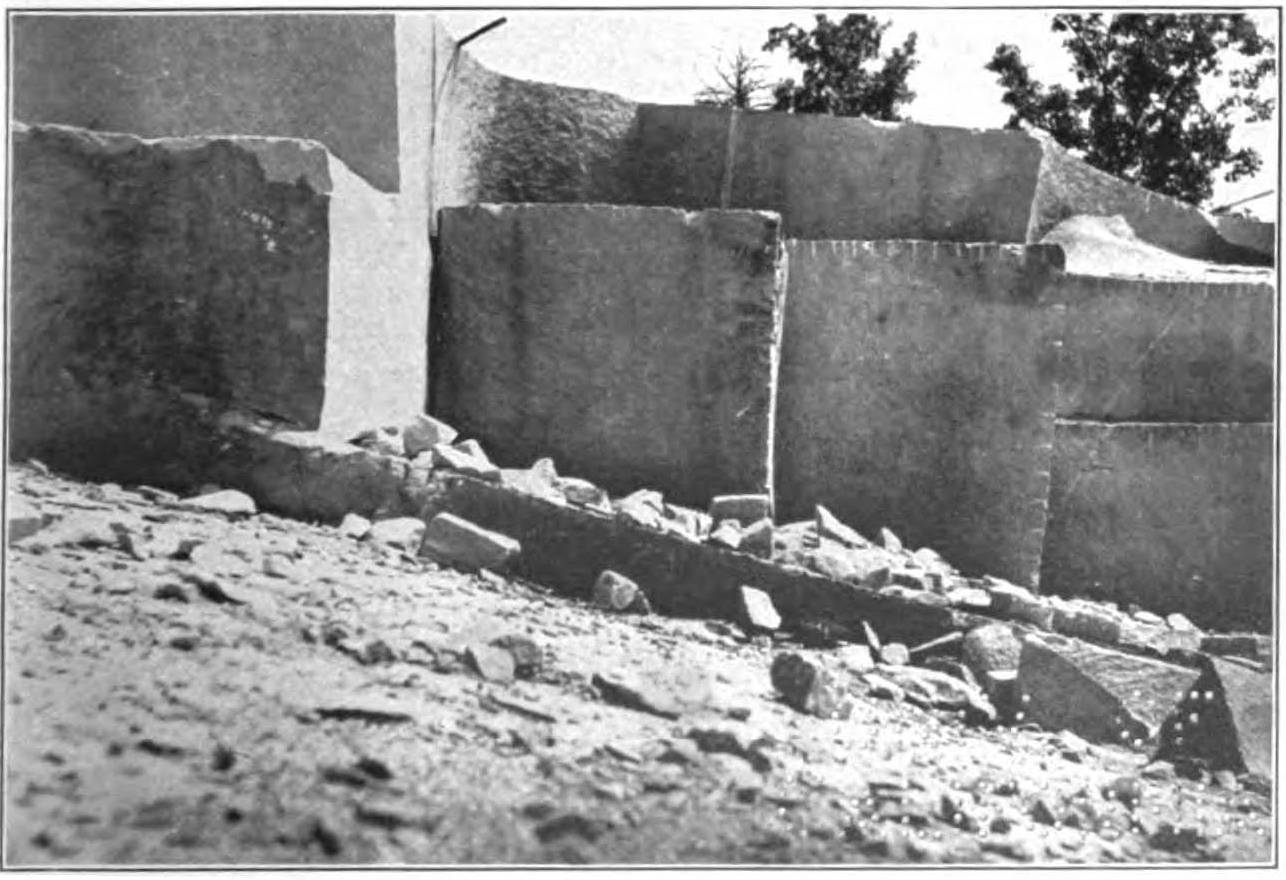
Another view of Rion Quarry, c. 1908

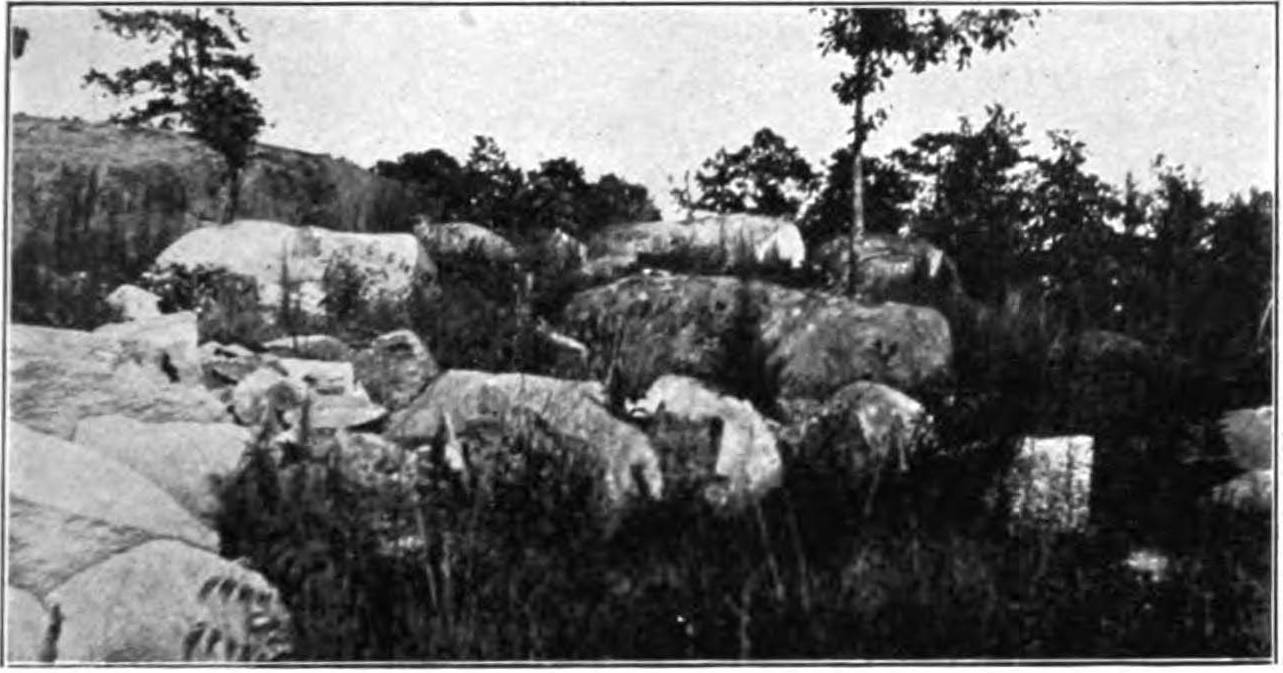
Boulder outcrops in Rion Quarry, c. 1908
