= Mount Olivet Presbyterian Church =

Historic church in South Carolina, United States

- U.S. National Register of Historic Places
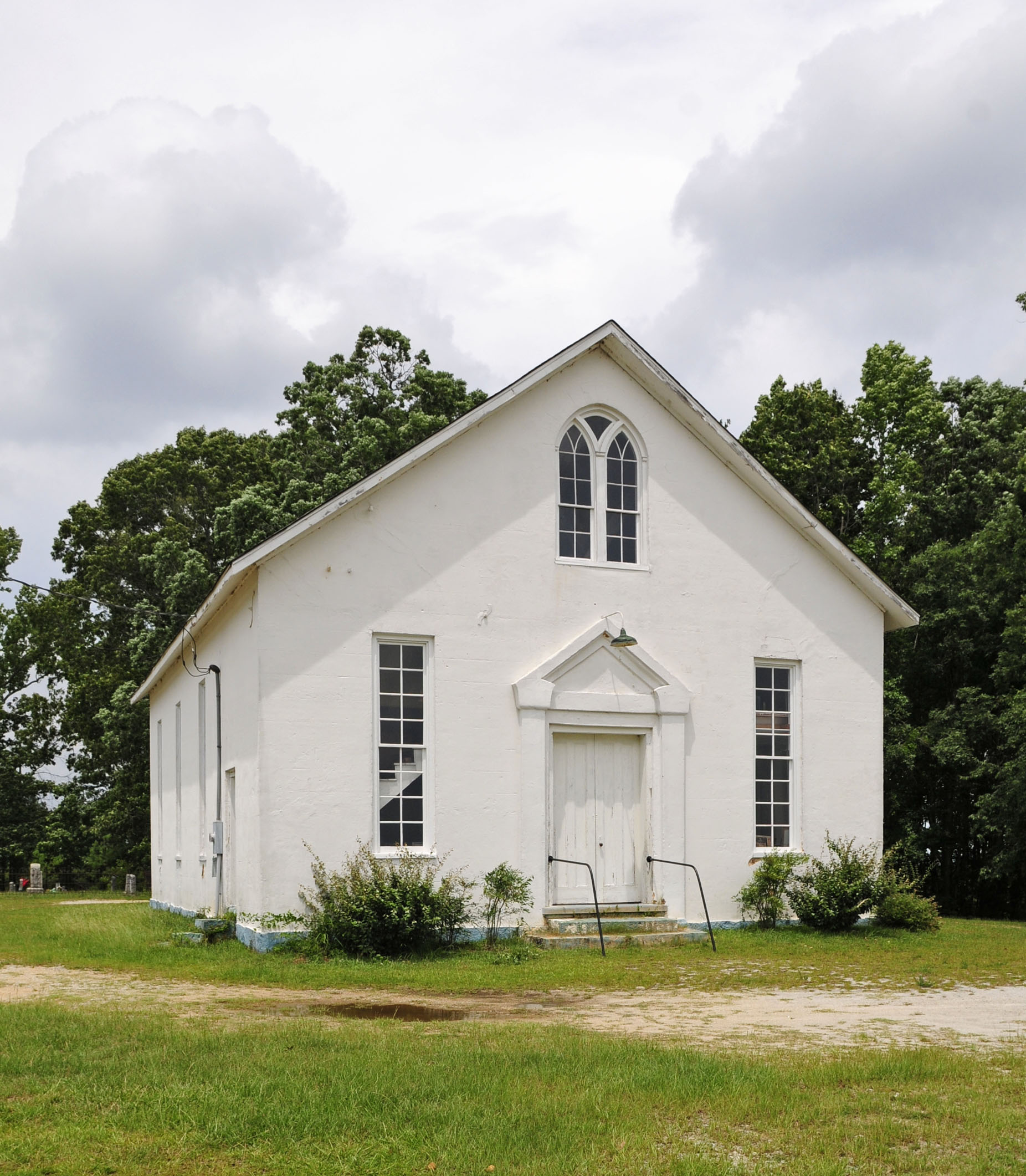

- Location within South Carolina Location within the United States
- Location: Off South Carolina Highway 200, near Winnsboro, South Carolina
- Coordinates: 34°27′55″N 81°2′2″W
- Area: 6 acres (2.4 ha)
- Built: 1869
- NRHP reference No.: 86001523
- Added to NRHP: August 13, 1986

Mount Olivet Presbyterian Church is a historic Presbyterian church located near Winnsboro, Fairfield County, South Carolina. It was built in 1869, and is a one-story, rectangular, front-gabled stuccoed brick building. The stucco is scored to resemble cut stone and the church sits on a granite foundation. The large cemetery northwest of the church contains several historically and artistically significant gravestones dating back to 1795 and is enclosed by a cast-iron fence.

It was added to the National Register of Historic Places in 1986.
