= Bob Lemmon House =

Historic house in South Carolina, United States

- U.S. National Register of Historic Places
- Location within South Carolina Location within the United States
- Location: Off South Carolina Highway 213, near Winnsboro, South Carolina
- Coordinates: 34°19′44″N 81°10′33″W
- Area: 0.7 acres (0.28 ha)
- Built: c. 1850
- MPS: Fairfield County MRA
- NRHP reference No.: 84000607
- Added to NRHP: December 6, 1984

Bob Lemmon House is a historic farmhouse located near Winnsboro, Fairfield County, South Carolina. It was built about 1850, and is a two-story, frame I-house. It has a gable roof, a single pile, central hall plan, and rear shed room additions. The façade features a two-tiered pedimented portico with four wooden Tuscan order columns. The property also includes a shed (c. 1910) and a barn (c. 1890), both of frame construction sheathed in weatherboard.

It was added to the National Register of Historic Places in 1984.
