= The Oaks (Winnsboro, South Carolina) =

Historic house in South Carolina, United States

- U.S. National Register of Historic Places
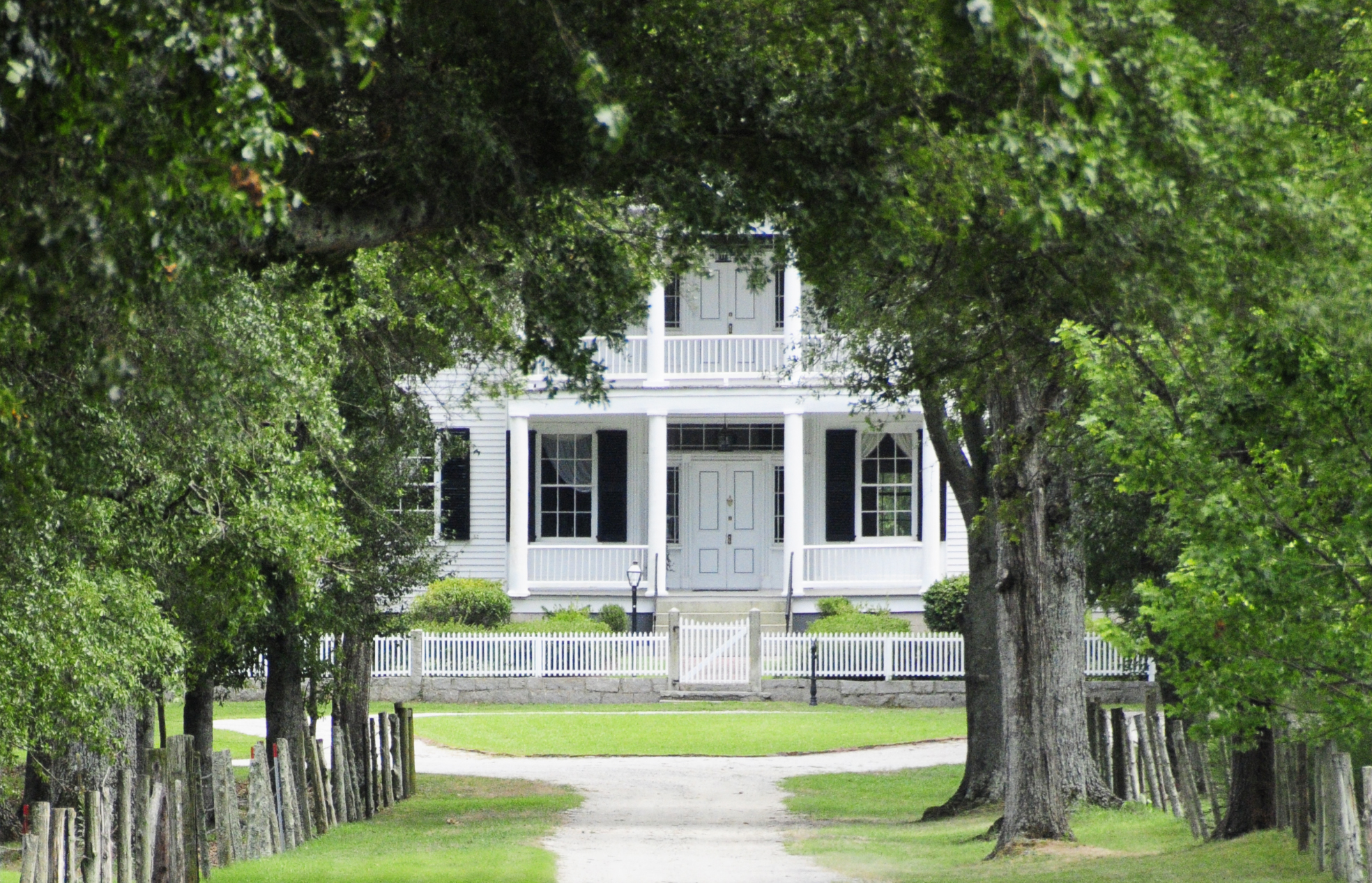
- The Oaks, July 2012

- Location within South Carolina Location within the United States
- Location: South Carolina Highway 213, near Winnsboro, South Carolina
- Coordinates: 34°21′03″N 81°11′15″W
- Area: 8.3 acres (3.4 ha)
- Built: c. 1850
- MPS: Fairfield County MRA
- NRHP reference No.: 84000624
- Added to NRHP: December 6, 1984

The Oaks is a historic plantation house located near Winnsboro, Fairfield County, South Carolina in the Piedmont region. It was built in 1835 by Richard Hallum, and is a large, two-story, weatherboarded frame residence with a gable-end roof. The front façade features a central, two-tiered pedimented portico supported by four simple wooden columns. From 1856 the property was owned by John Montgomery Lemmon and his descendants. Considered a moderately wealthy planter, in 1860 he owned 19 slaves and his entire plantation was worth $10,000 (~$283,891 in 2024).

This area was developed for cultivation of short-staple cotton in the 19th century, after the invention of the cotton gin, which made processing this type of cotton profitable. The antebellum residence was identified as notable by the state of South Carolina in 1983 and it was listed on the National Register of Historic Places in 1984.
