= Balwearie =

Historic house in South Carolina, United States

- U.S. National Register of Historic Places
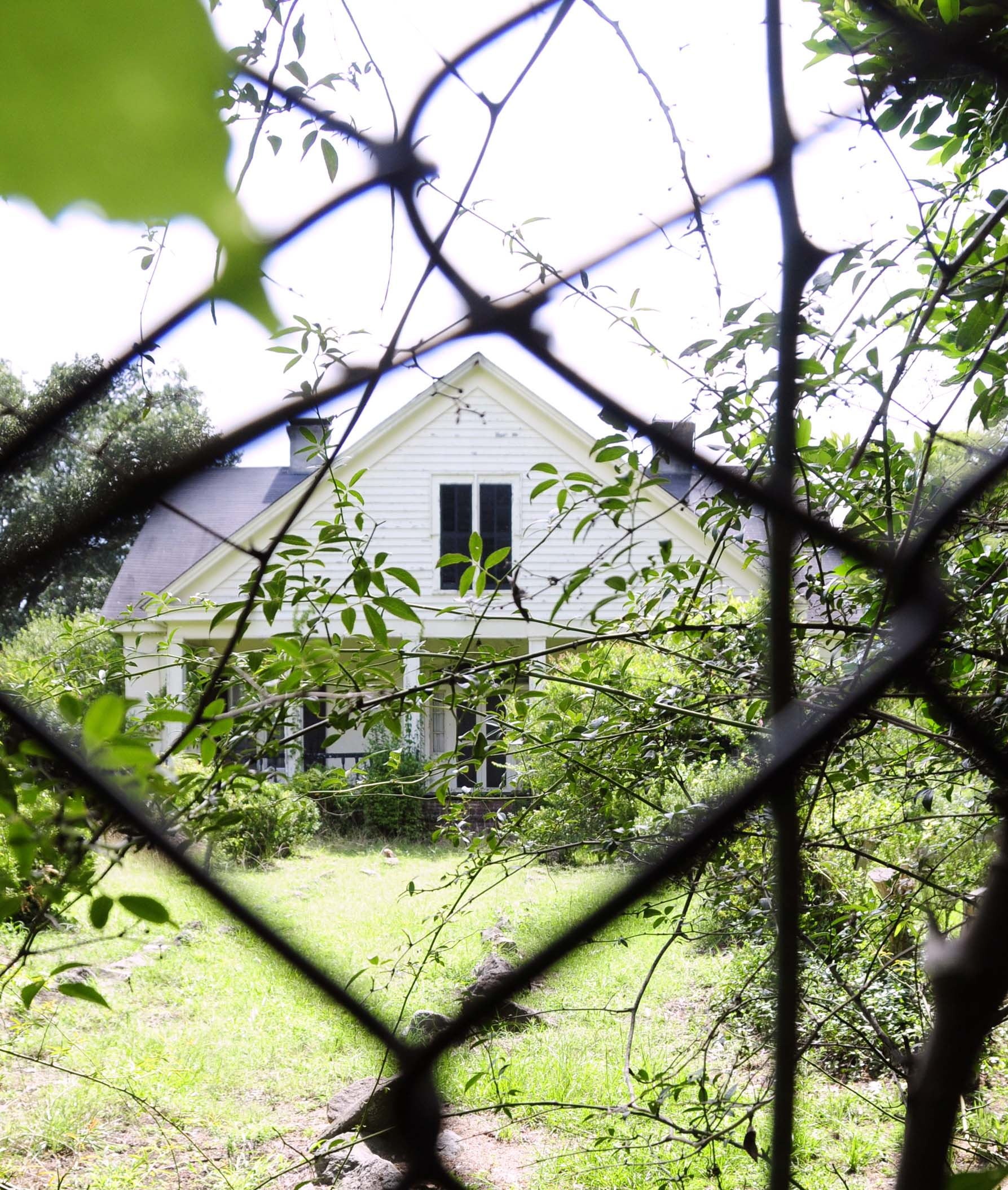
- Balwearie, July 2012

- Location within South Carolina Location within the United States
- Location: West of Winnsboro on South Carolina Highway 34, near Winnsboro, South Carolina
- Coordinates: 34.44861°N 81.24101°W
- Area: 2.2 acres (0.89 ha)
- Built: c. 1822, 1886
- MPS: Fairfield County MRA
- NRHP reference No.: 84000593
- Added to NRHP: December 6, 1984

Balwearie is a historic plantation house located near Winnsboro, Fairfield County, South Carolina. It is a 1 1/2-story, brick and frame residence with a gabled roof and cross-gabled front porch. The first story is of brick construction; half-story is sheathed in weatherboard. The front gable is supported by six paneled wooden posts. The house was constructed about 1822, but altered following an 1886 storm. A rear porch was converted into a kitchen in 1975.

It was added to the National Register of Historic Places in 1984.
