= Catherine Stratton Ladd =

American educator (1808–1899)

- Born: Catherine Stratton; October 28, 1808; Richmond, Virginia
- Died: January 31, 1899 (aged 90); Buena Vista, Fairfield County, South Carolina
- Other names: Pseudonyms Alida, Arcturus, Minnie Mayflower, and Morna
- Occupations: School founder, principal, teacher, poet, and writer
- Spouse: George Williamson Ladd (m. 1827)

Catherine Stratton Ladd (October 28, 1808 – January 31, 1899) was an American educator and school founder and principal. She was also a writer and poet. Before the war, she had two careers, teaching, and writing. She founded two schools, one of which was a boarding school in Winnsboro, South Carolina. She was a correspondent for a newspaper.

During the Civil War, she led the Soldiers' Aid Association and cared for ill and injured soldiers. Her house and her collection of literary works perished during a fire set by the Union Army that spread through Winnsboro.

== Personal life ==
Catherine Stratton, born October 28, 1808, in Richmond, Virginia, the daughter of Nancy (Collins) and James Stratton. Ladd attended schools in Richmond. She married George Williamson Ladd in South Carolina in 1827. She is also said to have married George W. L. Ladd on November 19, 1828, in Richmond, Virginia. George was a teacher and a painter of portraits and miniature paintings. Born in Plymouth, New Hampshire in 1802, George came to Richmond, Virginia as a young man to establish a business painting portraits.

After their marriage, the couple first lived in Charleston, South Carolina. By 1830, the Ladds lived in Fayetteville.

Ladd's children were:

- Albert Washington (A. W.), born about 1836, Dry-good merchant
- Charles H., born about 1838, Physician
- Josephine N., born about 1843 to 1848, School teacher
- George D., born about 1845 to 1846, not on the 1870 census
- Catharine, born about 1847, not on the 1860 or 1870 census
- Annie B. or Anna, born about 1851 to 1853

Ladd gave birth to her first child, Albert, in 1836, in Chester County, South Carolina. Charles was born in 1838 in Macon, Georgia.

In 1860, the Ladds had four servants and 8 enslaved people, from one month to 60 years of age. Two domestic servants, Lucy (40) and Harriet Hopkins (55), and a five-year-old boy Edward Hopkins lived with the Ladd family in 1870.

The Ladds settled in Winnsboro and they were both able to establish businesses in the town. George painted portraits, obtaining new patients based upon word-of-mouth. Ladd was active in church, charitable, and social events during her years at Winnsboro.

== School founder and educator ==
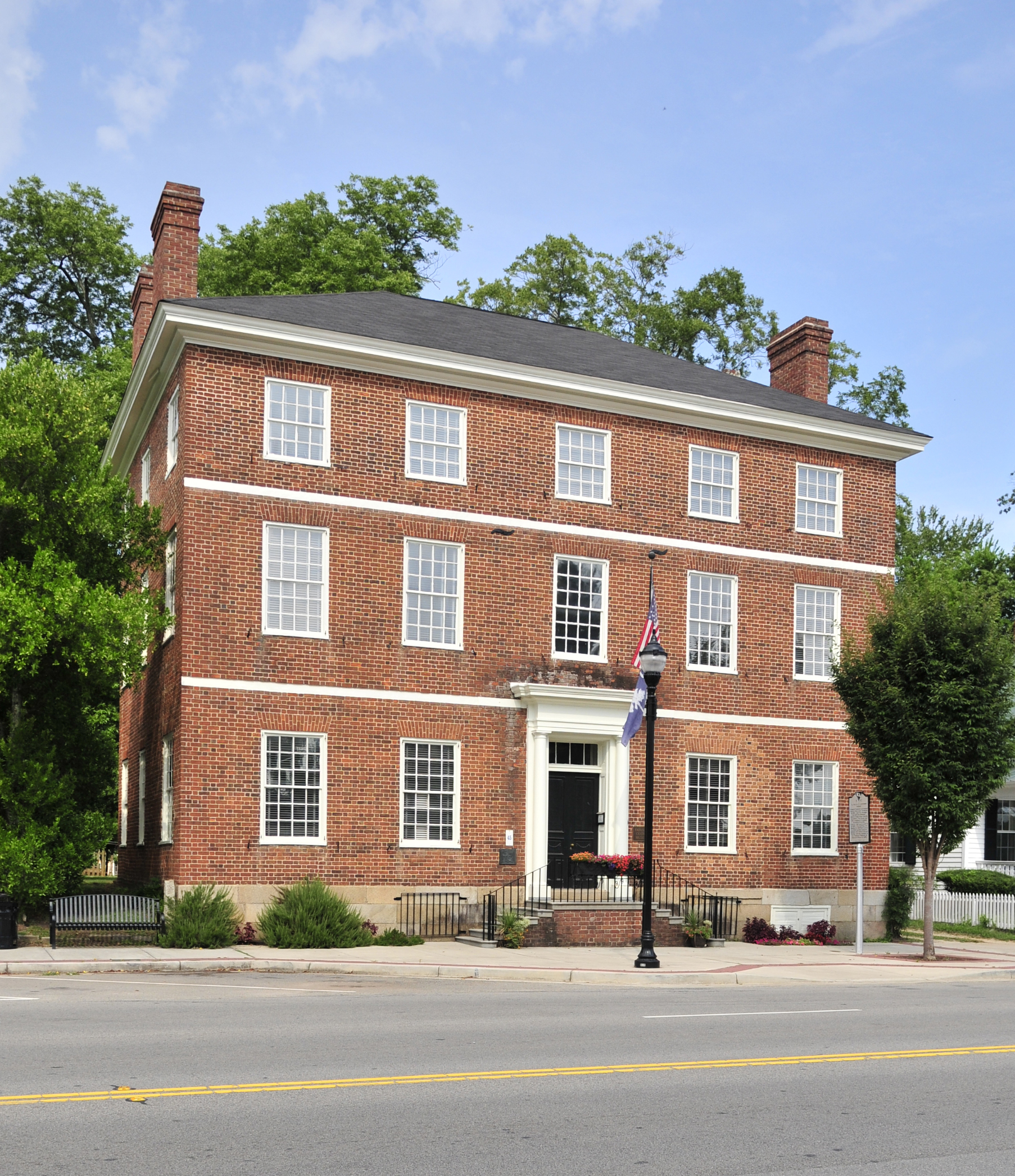
Ketchin Building, 231 S. Congress St., Winnsboro, South Carolina the site of the Ladd's residence and the Winnsboro Female Institute

Ladd began teaching in 1828 in South Carolina. She was the principal and founded Roseville Academy on Northern Stage Road in Wake County, North Carolina, 14 miles from Raleigh by October 1832 and opened in January 1833. She taught a standard curriculum of reading, writing, arithmetic, grammar, geography, and marking. She also had three additional types of coursework. There was an advanced class of history, philosophy, and chemistry. The school also provided education in music and a wide range of art techniques. George taught art, and likely most of his income as a teacher.

After the birth of her second child, Ladd taught at a female academy in Macon, Georgia. She next taught at a school on Dr. John Bratton's plantation in Brattonsville, South Carolina. According to Patricia V. Veasey, they were in Brattonsville until 1842.

In 1840, she founded the Winnsboro Female Institute in South Carolina and had one hundred students soon after opening. It was a boarding school that she operated from 1841 (Note: Veasey states that she ran the school starting in 1843.) until 1861. Both Ladd and her husband taught at the school until the start of the Civil War.

== Writer ==
Ladd began writing in 1928 and became well-known for her articles on education, painting, and drawing. She began by writing and publishing poetry. Then she was a correspondent for several newspapers. She contributed to periodicals under the pseudonym Alida, Arcturus, Minnie Mayflower, and Morna.

Her work was published in American publications, including Southern Literary Messenger, Floral Wreath, and other Southern journals and magazines. Her work was also published in Canadian journals, like The Week and Canadian Magazine. The publisher of the Floral Wreath, Edwin Heriott, said that her poetry was "sweet, smooth, and flowing, particularly so, but like Scotch music, their gayest notes are sad."

She wrote articles about art and education. She wrote essays and tales. She wrote plays—like Honeymoon and Great Scheme—at her friends' requests, and they performed them on stage.

She advocated employing white people and establishing cotton manufacturing factories, due to the competitive pressure in the Deep South to grow cotton.

== Civil War and George's death ==
Ladd is said to have designed the first Confederate flag, although it has been said that it was designed by Prussian-American artist Nicola Marschall in Marion, Alabama, and is said to resemble the Flag of Austria.

She stopped teaching to care for injured and ill soldiers and provided them with clothing. Throughout the war, she was the president of the Soldiers' Aid Association.

Ladd's husband, George W. L. Ladd, died of infirmity at home in Winnsboro on July 14, 1864. Her house and her 30-year collection of literary works were destroyed on February 21, 1865, by the Union Army under General William Tecumseh Sherman.

== After the war and death ==
Ladd resumed teaching after the war. She moved in 1880 to Buckhead, South Carolina, near Winnsboro, where she lived on a farm. Ladd went blind in 1891. She transcribed poetry to people who would write it down for her. She died on January 31, 1899, at Buena Vista, Fairfield County, South Carolina.
