= Webster Anderson =

United States Army Medal of Honor recipient (1933–2003)

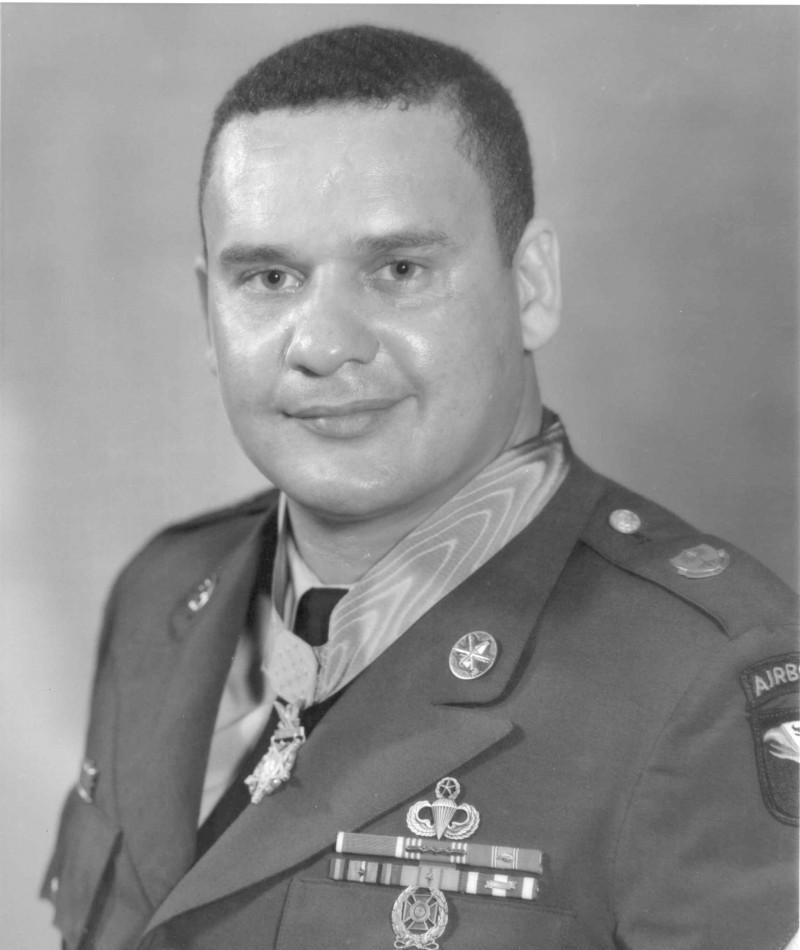
- Medal of Honor recipient
- Born: July 15, 1933; Winnsboro, South Carolina, U.S.
- Died: August 30, 2003 (aged 70); Fairfield County, South Carolina, U.S.
- Burial place: Blackjack Baptist Church Cemetery, Winnsboro, South Carolina
- Military career
- Allegiance: United States
- Branch: United States Army
- Service years: 1953–1968
- Rank: Sergeant First Class
- Units: 2nd Battalion, 320th Artillery Regiment, 101st Airborne Infantry Division (Airmobile)
- Conflicts: Korean War; Vietnam War
- Awards: Medal of Honor; Purple Heart

Webster Anderson (July 15, 1933 – August 30, 2003) was a United States Army soldier and a recipient of America's highest military decoration—the Medal of Honor—for his actions in the Vietnam War.

Anderson joined the Army from his birth city of Winnsboro, South Carolina in 1953 and served during the Korean War, and by October 15, 1967, was serving as a staff sergeant in Battery A, 2nd Battalion, 320th Artillery Regiment, 101st Airborne Infantry Division (Airmobile). On that day, Anderson's artillery unit was attacked by North Vietnamese forces near Tam Kỳ in the Republic of Vietnam. Anderson directed the defense of the unit's position and continued to lead after twice being severely wounded. Despite losing both of his legs and part of an arm, he survived his wounds and was promoted to the rank of Sergeant First Class before being retired and awarded the Medal of Honor for his actions during the battle.

== Medal of Honor citation ==
Citation:

Sfc. Anderson (then S/Sgt.), distinguished himself by conspicuous gallantry and intrepidity in action while serving as chief of section in Battery A, against a hostile force. During the early morning hours Battery A's defensive position was attacked by a determined North Vietnamese Army infantry unit supported by heavy mortar, recoilless rifle, rocket propelled grenade and automatic weapon fire. The initial enemy onslaught breached the battery defensive perimeter. Sfc. Anderson, with complete disregard for his personal safety, mounted the exposed parapet of his howitzer position and became the mainstay of the defense of the battery position. Sfc. Anderson directed devastating direct howitzer fire on the assaulting enemy while providing rifle and grenade defensive fire against enemy soldiers attempting to overrun his gun section position. While protecting his crew and directing their fire against the enemy from his exposed position, 2 enemy grenades exploded at his feet knocking him down and severely wounding him in the legs. Despite the excruciating pain and though not able to stand, Sfc. Anderson valorously propped himself on the parapet and continued to direct howitzer fire upon the closing enemy and to encourage his men to fight on. Seeing an enemy grenade land within the gun pit near a wounded member of his gun crew, Sfc. Anderson heedless of his own safety, seized the grenade and attempted to throw it over the parapet to save his men. As the grenade was thrown from the position it exploded and Sfc. Anderson was again grievously wounded. Although only partially conscious and severely wounded, Sfc. Anderson refused medical evacuation and continued to encourage his men in the defense of the position. Sfc. Anderson by his inspirational leadership, professionalism, devotion to duty and complete disregard for his welfare was able to maintain the defense of his section position and to defeat a determined attack. Sfc. Anderson's gallantry and extraordinary heroism at the risk of his life above and beyond the call of duty are in the highest traditions of the military service and reflect great credit upon himself, his unit, and the U.S. Army.

== Awards and decorations ==

Badge	Master Parachutist Badge		
1st row	Medal of Honor		
2nd row	Purple Heart	Army Good Conduct Medal with 3 Good Conduct Loops	National Defense Service Medal with 1 Oak leaf cluster
3rd row	Armed Forces Expeditionary Medal with 1 Service star	Vietnam Service Medal with 2 Campaign stars	Vietnam Campaign Medal
Unit awards	Presidential Unit Citation with 2 Oak leaf clusters		Republic of Vietnam Gallantry Cross Unit Citation with Palm

== Later life and death ==
After the death of his first wife Ida in 1991, he married a second time in 1996. Webster Anderson died at age 70 of colon cancer and was buried in Blackjack Baptist Church Cemetery in his hometown of Winnsboro, South Carolina.

== See also ==
- List of Medal of Honor recipients for the Vietnam War
