= Dr. Walter Brice House and Office =

Historic house in South Carolina, United States

- U.S. National Register of Historic Places
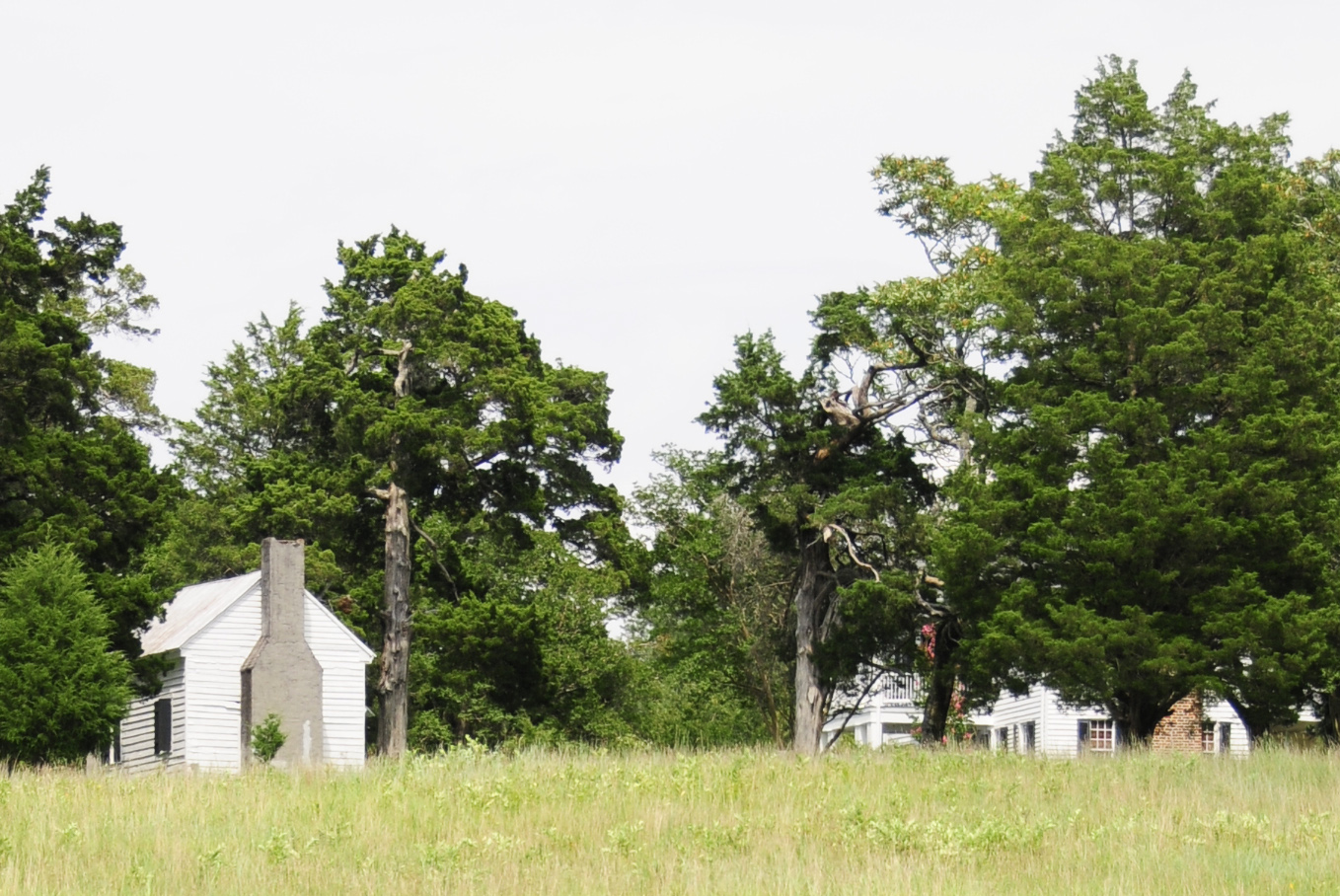
- Dr Walter Brice House, July 2012

- Location within South Carolina Location within the United States
- Location: Northwest of Winnsboro, near Winnsboro, South Carolina
- Coordinates: 34°30′17″N 81°14′40″W
- Area: 5.7 acres (2.3 ha)
- Built: c. 1840
- Architectural style: Greek Revival
- MPS: Fairfield County MRA
- NRHP reference No.: 84000594
- Added to NRHP: December 6, 1984

Dr. Walter Brice House and Office is a historic plantation house and office located near Winnsboro, Fairfield County, South Carolina. It was built about 1840, and is a two-story, weatherboarded frame, L-shaped Greek Revival style dwelling. It features a two-tiered, pedimented front verandah supported by four wooden pillars. The Dr. Walter Brice Office is a 10-foot-by-12-foot weatherboarded frame building with a metal gable roof. Dr. Walter Brice (1804 - ca. 1871) was a prominent Fairfield County planter and physician before the American Civil War.

It was added to the National Register of Historic Places in 1984.
