= Rural Point =

Historic house in South Carolina, United States

- U.S. National Register of Historic Places
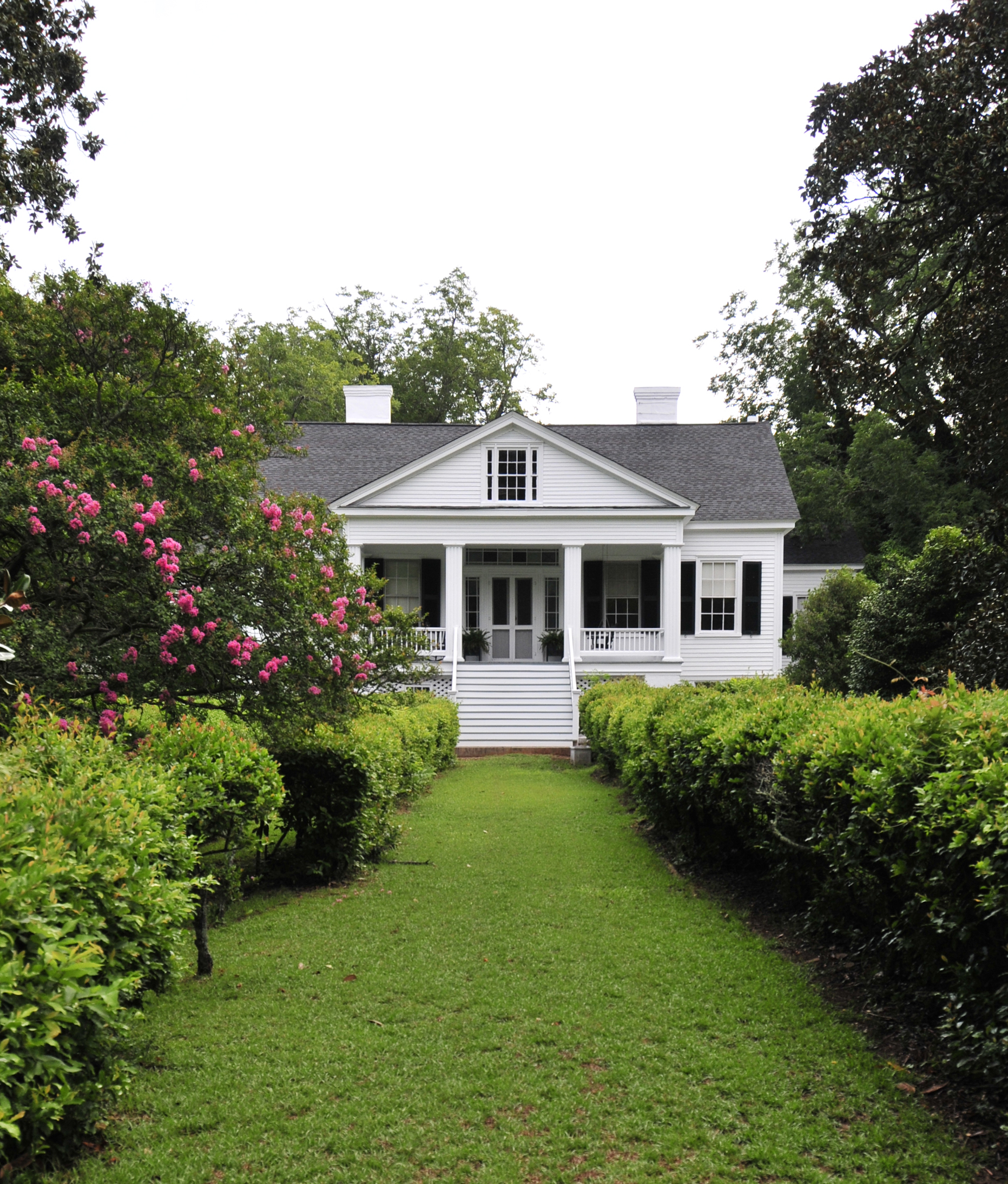
- Rural Point, July 2012

- Location within South Carolina Location within the United States
- Location: Old Camden Rd., Winnsboro, South Carolina
- Coordinates: 34°21′57″N 81°4′36″W
- Area: 2 acres (0.81 ha)
- Built: 1852
- Architectural style: Greek Revival
- NRHP reference No.: 72001210
- Added to NRHP: February 23, 1972

Rural Point, also known as Robertson House and Doty House, is a historic home and garden located at Winnsboro, Fairfield County, South Carolina. It was built in 1852, and is a 1 1/2-story, 12 bay, Greek Revival style frame dwelling over a high basement. The façade features a gable-roofed porch which is supported by four square columns. The property features a semi-formal garden said to have been designed by John Grimke Drayton, noted landscape architect of Magnolia Gardens in Charleston, South Carolina. Also on the property is a typical southern planter's office of white clapboard. It was built by William Ross Robertson, probate judge and commissioner of equity of Fairfield County who served in South Carolina House of Representatives and as a member of the Secession Convention.

It was added to the National Register of Historic Places in 1972.
