= Hunstanton (Winnsboro, South Carolina) =

Historic house in South Carolina, United States

- U.S. National Register of Historic Places
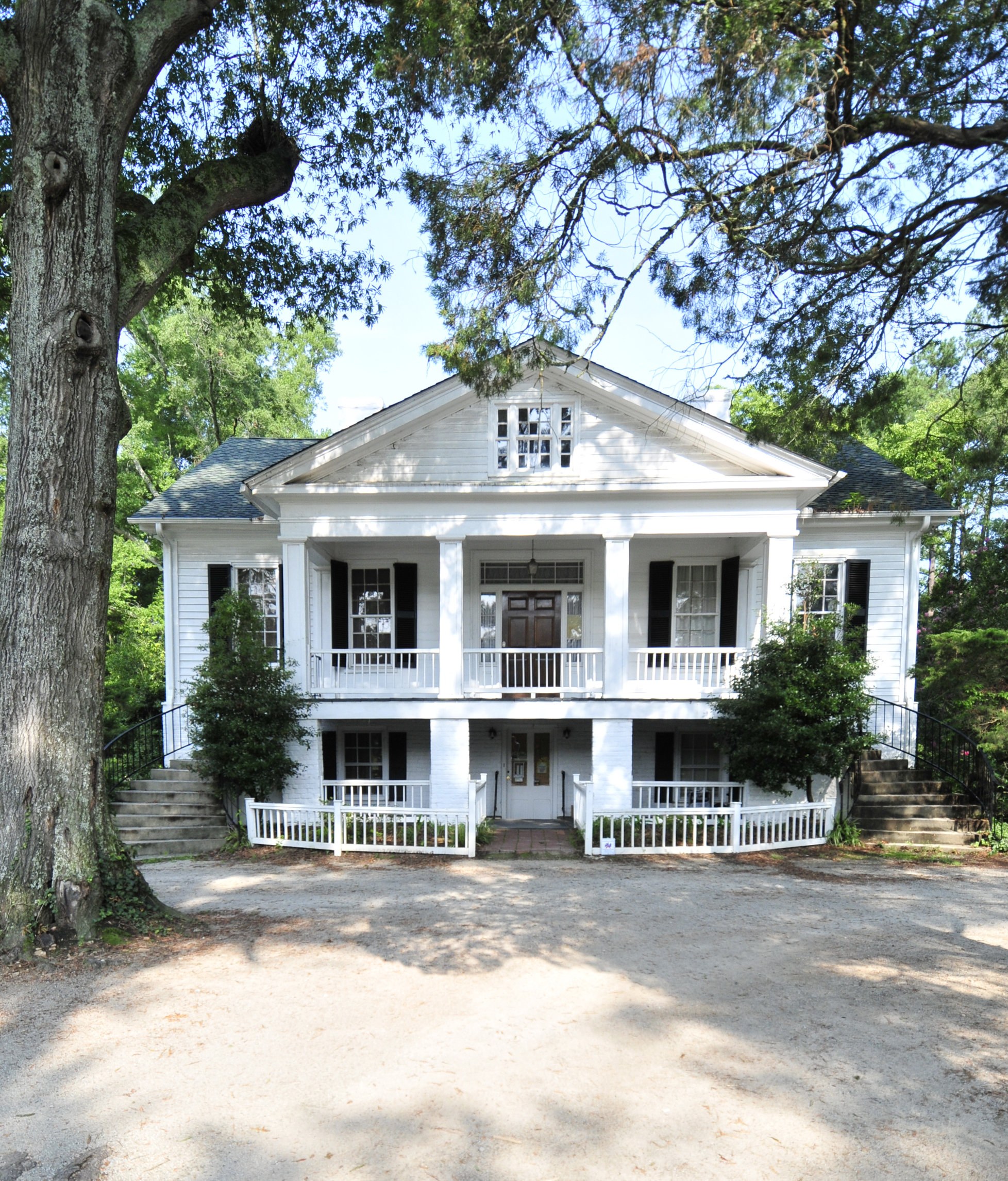
- Hunstanton, July 2012

- Location within South Carolina Location within the United States
- Location: U.S. Route 321, near Winnsboro, South Carolina
- Coordinates: 34°21′6″N 81°5′11″W
- Area: 1.4 acres (0.57 ha)
- Built: c. 1850
- Architectural style: Greek Revival
- MPS: Fairfield County MRA
- NRHP reference No.: 84000604
- Added to NRHP: December 6, 1984

Hunstanton, also known as Sweet Briar, is a historic plantation house located near Winnsboro, Fairfield County, South Carolina. It was built about 1850, and is a 1 1/2-story, rectangular, weatherboarded Greek Revival style frame residence on a raised brick basement. It has a rear ell and the front façade features a pedimented porch with paneled wooden pillars.

It was added to the National Register of Historic Places in 1984.
