= Tocaland =

Historic house in South Carolina, United States

- U.S. National Register of Historic Places
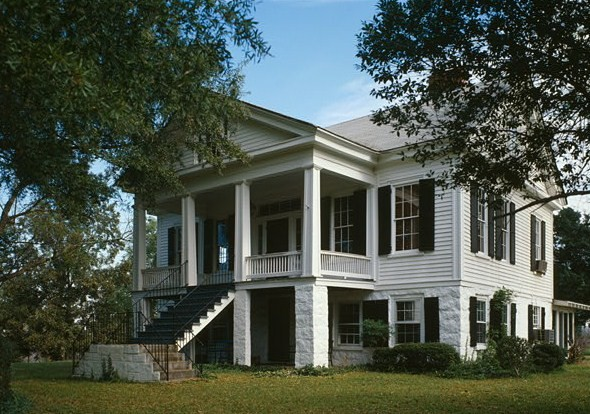

- Location within South Carolina Location within the United States
- Location: Route 344 near Winnsboro, Fairfield County, South Carolina
- Coordinates: 34°20′26″N 81°4′18″W
- Area: 1.2 acres (0.49 ha)
- Built: 1854
- Architectural style: Greek Revival
- MPS: Fairfield County MRA
- NRHP reference No.: 84000627
- Added to NRHP: December 6, 1984

Tocaland is a historic plantation house located on S.C. Route 344 near Winnsboro, Fairfield County, South Carolina. It was built about 1854, and is a 1 1/2-story, weatherboarded frame Greek revival style dwelling on a raised basement. The front facade features four 8-foot high stuccoed granite piers that support a pedimented front porch. The porch is supported by four paneled wooden pillars, pilasters, and has a plain balustrade.

It was added to the National Register of Historic Places in 1984.
