= Ketchin Building =

- U.S. National Register of Historic Places
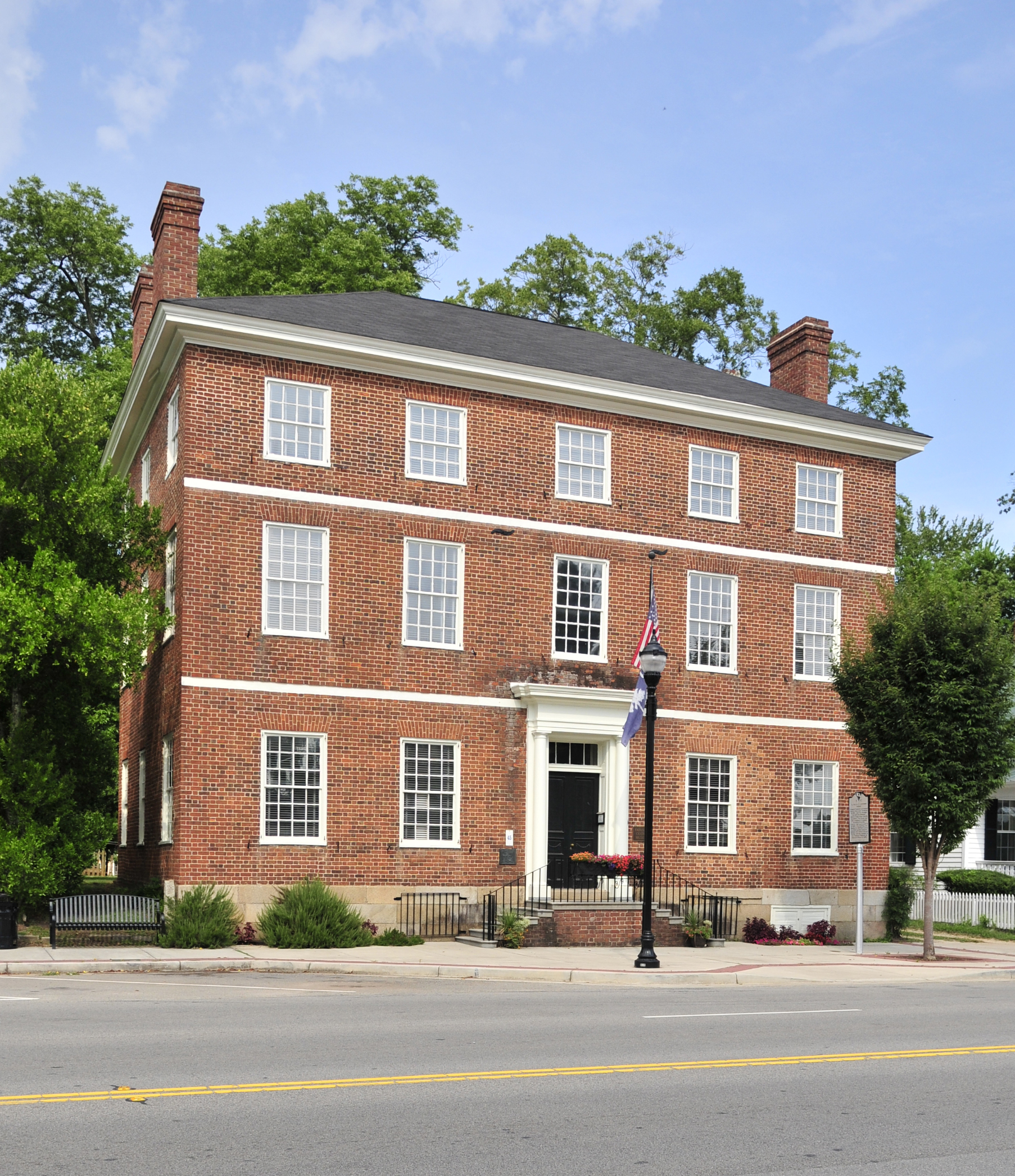
- Ketchin Building, July 2012

- Location within South Carolina Location within the United States
- Location: 231 S. Congress St., Winnsboro, South Carolina
- Coordinates: 34°22′33″N 81°5′8″W
- Area: 0.4 acres (0.16 ha)
- Built: c. 1830
- Architectural style: Federal
- NRHP reference No.: 70000588
- Added to NRHP: December 18, 1970

Ketchin Building, also known as the Fairfield County Historical Museum, is a historic building located at Winnsboro, Fairfield County, South Carolina. It was built about 1830, and is a three-story, five-bay, Federal style brick building with a hipped roof. Originally built as a dwelling by Richard Cathcart in 1830, it was sold in 1852 and was used as Catherine Stratton Ladd's Winnsboro Female Institute until closed by the American Civil War.

It was added to the National Register of Historic Places in 1971.
