= Monticello Store and Post Office =

- U.S. National Register of Historic Places
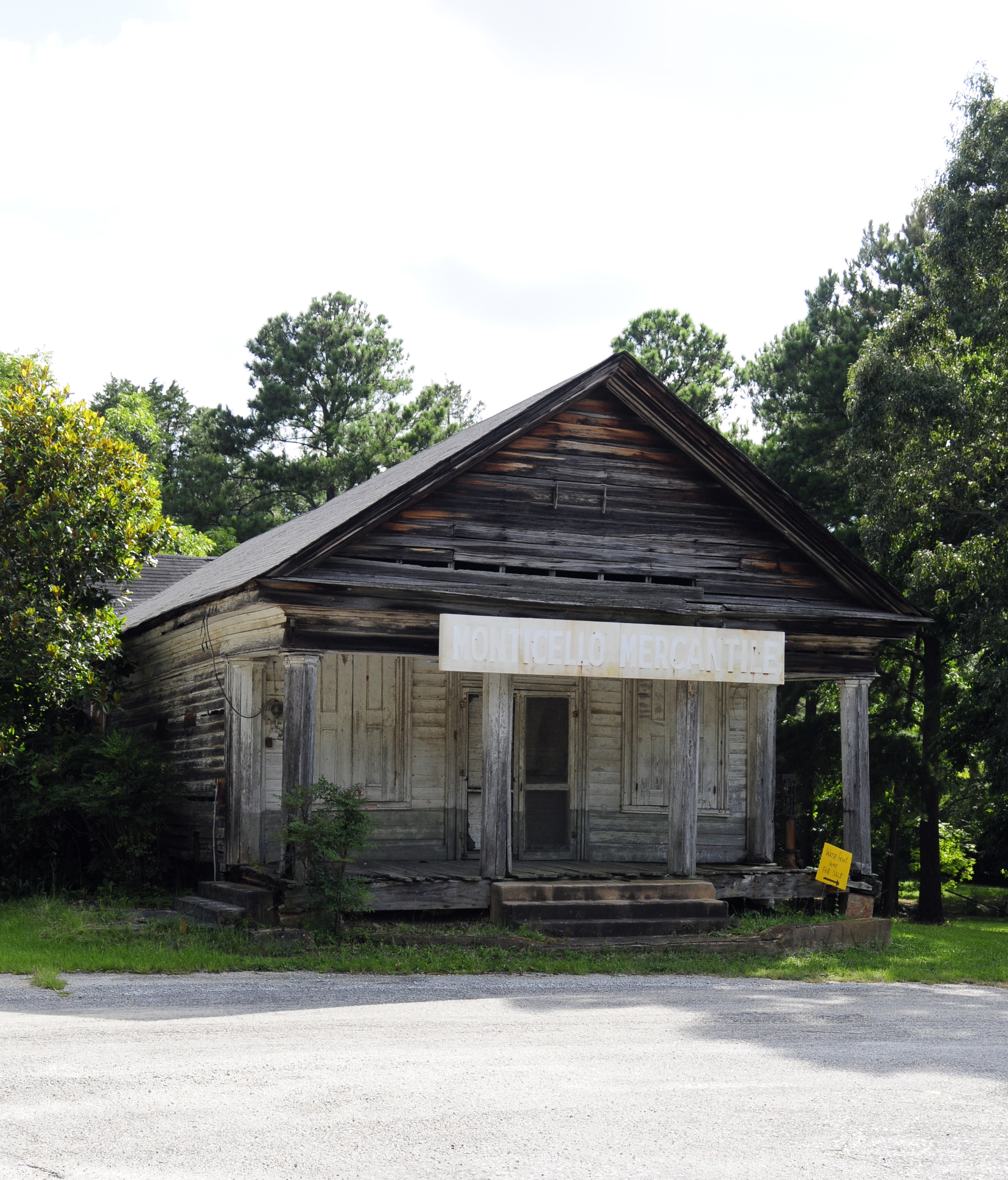
- Monticello Store and Post Office, July 2012

- Location within South Carolina Location within the United States
- Location: Off SC 215, Monticello, South Carolina
- Coordinates: 34°21′11″N 81°17′58″W
- Area: 0.8 acres (0.32 ha)
- Built: c. 1820
- MPS: Fairfield County MRA
- NRHP reference No.: 84000584
- Added to NRHP: December 6, 1984

Monticello Store and Post Office is a historic general store and post office located at Monticello, Fairfield County, South Carolina, United States. It may have been built as early as 1820, and is a one-story, frame, weatherboarded, T-shaped building. The front façade features an undercut gallery with a pedimented gable supported by octagonal wooden columns. The building was used as a store and post office after the American Civil War until the mid-1960s.

It was added to the National Register of Historic Places in 1984.
