= Monticello Methodist Church =

Historic church in South Carolina, United States

- U.S. National Register of Historic Places
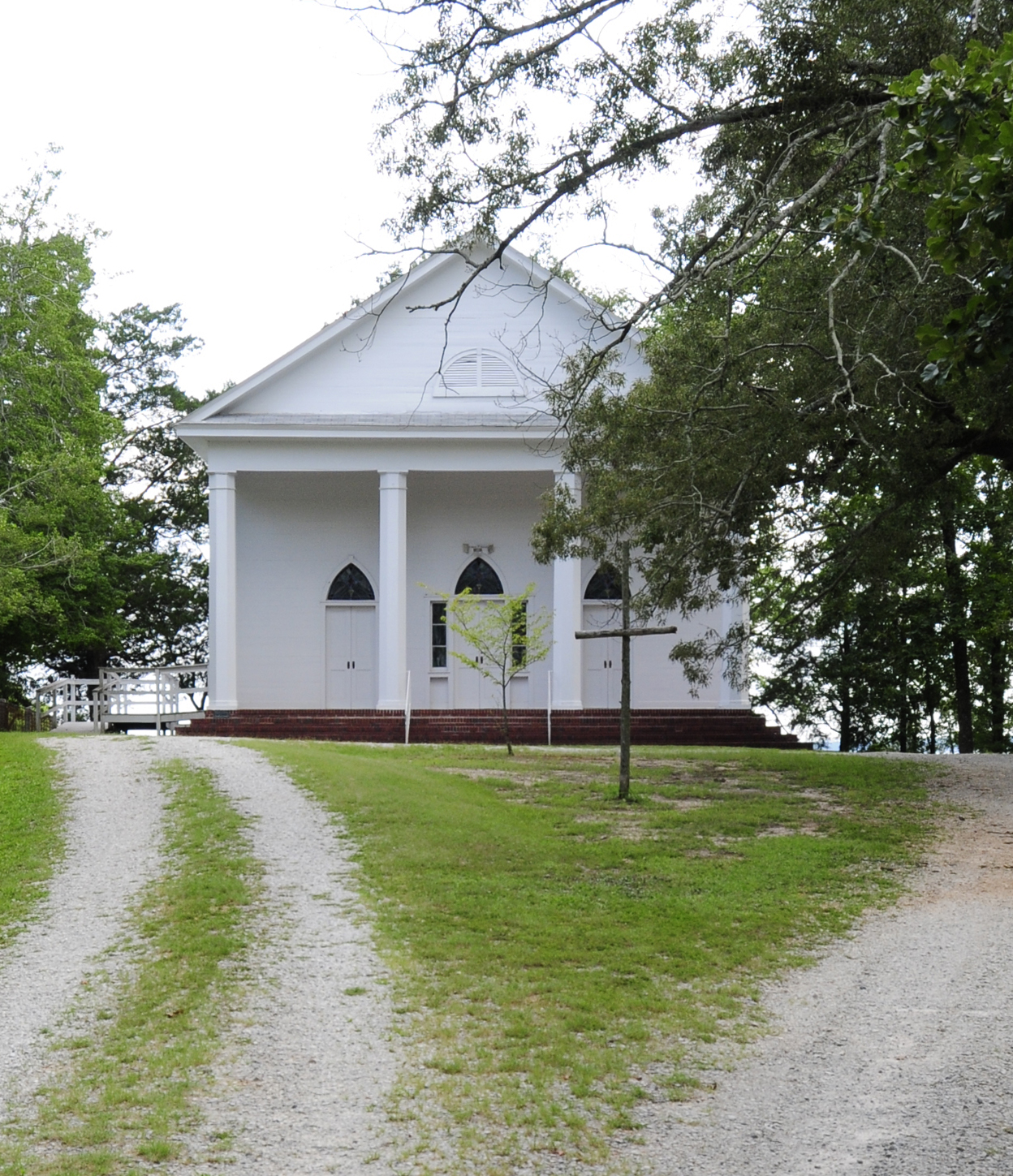

- Location within South Carolina Location within the United States
- Location: Off SC 215, Monticello, South Carolina
- Coordinates: 34°20′59″N 81°17′57″W
- Area: 0.7 acres (0.28 ha)
- Built: 1861
- Architect: Bookman, Jacob
- MPS: Fairfield County MRA
- NRHP reference No.: 84000578
- Added to NRHP: December 06, 1984

Monticello Methodist Church is a historic Methodist church off SC 215 in Monticello, Fairfield County, South Carolina. It was built in 1861, and is a one-story, front-gable-roofed, weatherboarded frame building in the Greek Revival style with a meeting house floor plan. The façade features a portico is supported by octagonal wooden columns on a stepped brick entrance. Also on the property is the church cemetery.

It was added to the National Register of Historic Places in 1984.
