= Blair Mound =

Archaeological site in South Carolina, United States

- U.S. National Register of Historic Places
- Nearest city: Winnsboro, South Carolina
- Area: 9.9 acres (4.0 ha)
- NRHP reference No.: 74001853
- Added to NRHP: August 23, 1974

Blair Mound is a historic archaeological site located near Winnsboro, Fairfield County, South Carolina. Blair Mound is an earthen mound structure in the form of a low, oval hummock. It measures approximately 75 by 50 yards (69 m × 46 m) and is just over 5 feet (1.5 m) high, with evidence of leveling for agricultural development.

The mound was constructed on the site of a late Woodland trash midden. It represents a late phase of the widespread Mississippian culture Pattern, and appears to have been constructed by A.D. 1300–1400.

It was added to the National Register of Historic Places in 1974.
