= Concord Presbyterian Church (South Carolina) =

Historic church in South Carolina, United States

- U.S. National Register of Historic Places
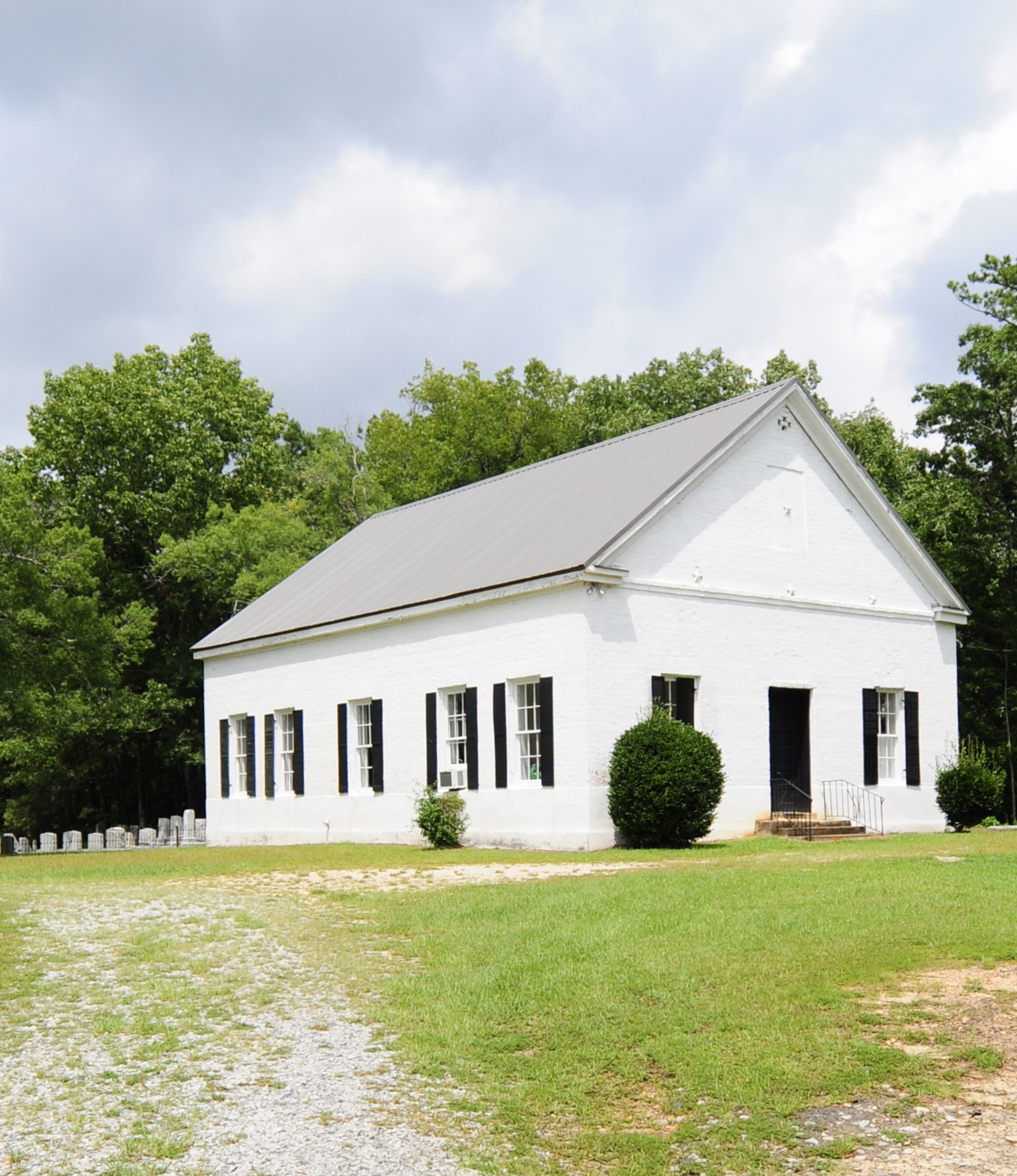

- Location within South Carolina Location within the United States
- Location: U.S. Route 321, near Winnsboro, South Carolina
- Coordinates: 34°31′27″N 81°10′10″W
- Area: 1.8 acres (0.73 ha)
- Built: 1818
- MPS: Fairfield County MRA
- NRHP reference No.: 84000598
- Added to NRHP: December 6, 1984

Concord Presbyterian Church is a historic Presbyterian church located near Winnsboro, Fairfield County, South Carolina. It was built in 1818, and is a one-story, brick, gable-roofed building with a meeting house floor plan. It has a small, rectangular, gable-roofed rear extension and sits on a granite foundation. Also on the property is a cemetery with a cast-iron fence and gates.

It was added to the National Register of Historic Places in 1984.
