= Old Buckhead, South Carolina =

Settlement in South Carolina, United States

Coordinates: 34°27′01″N 81°18′03″W

Old Buckhead is an unincorporated community in Fairfield County, in the U.S. state of South Carolina.

== History ==
A variant name is "Buckhead". The community was named for the deer which abounded in the area. A post office called Buckhead was established in 1825, and remained in operation until 1912.
