= Monticello, South Carolina =

- Unincorporated community
- Location within South Carolina Location within the United States
- Coordinates: 34°21′10″N 81°17′54″W
- Country: United States
- State: South Carolina
- County: Fairfield
- Elevation: 499 ft (152 m)
- Time zone: UTC-5 (Eastern (EST))
  - Summer (DST): UTC-4 (EDT)
- Area codes: 803, 839
- GNIS feature ID: 1231555

Monticello, South Carolina is an unincorporated community in Fairfield County, South Carolina, United States.

It is the location of four places listed on the U.S. National Register of Historic Places:

- Davis Plantation
- Fonti Flora Plantation
- Monticello Methodist Church
- Monticello Store and Post Office

== Notable residents ==
- Jonathan R. Davis, gunfighter
- Gene Richards, former left fielder for the San Diego Padres.
