= Fonti Flora Plantation =

Historic house in South Carolina, United States

- U.S. National Register of Historic Places
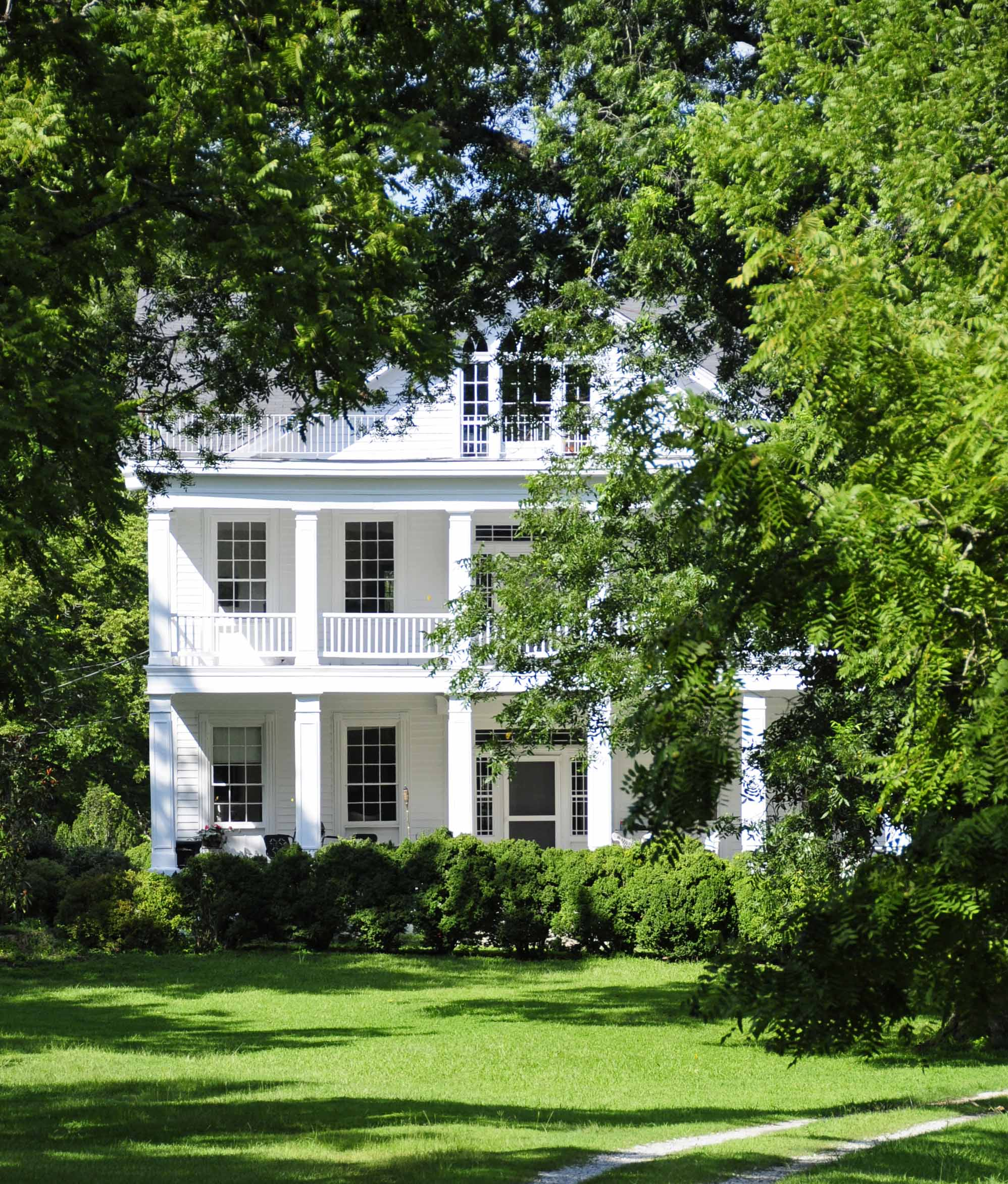
- Fonti Flora Plantation, July 2012

- Location within South Carolina Location within the United States
- Location: 5.4 miles northeast of Monticello on South Carolina Highway 99, near Monticello, South Carolina
- Coordinates: 34°24′6″N 81°20′45″W
- Area: 4 acres (1.6 ha)
- Built: c. 1836
- Architectural style: Greek Revival, Gothic Revival
- NRHP reference No.: 79002382
- Added to NRHP: April 24, 1979

Fonti Flora Plantation is a historic plantation house located near Monticello, Fairfield County, South Carolina. It was built about 1836, and is a 2-½ story clapboard residence set on low foundations. The front façade features a full-width two-story Greek Revival portico supported by six square paneled piers. Additional decorative detail includes the Gothic Revival style tripartite Gothic windows on the front and side facades.

It was added to the National Register of Historic Places in 1979.
