= Winnsboro, South Carolina =

- Town
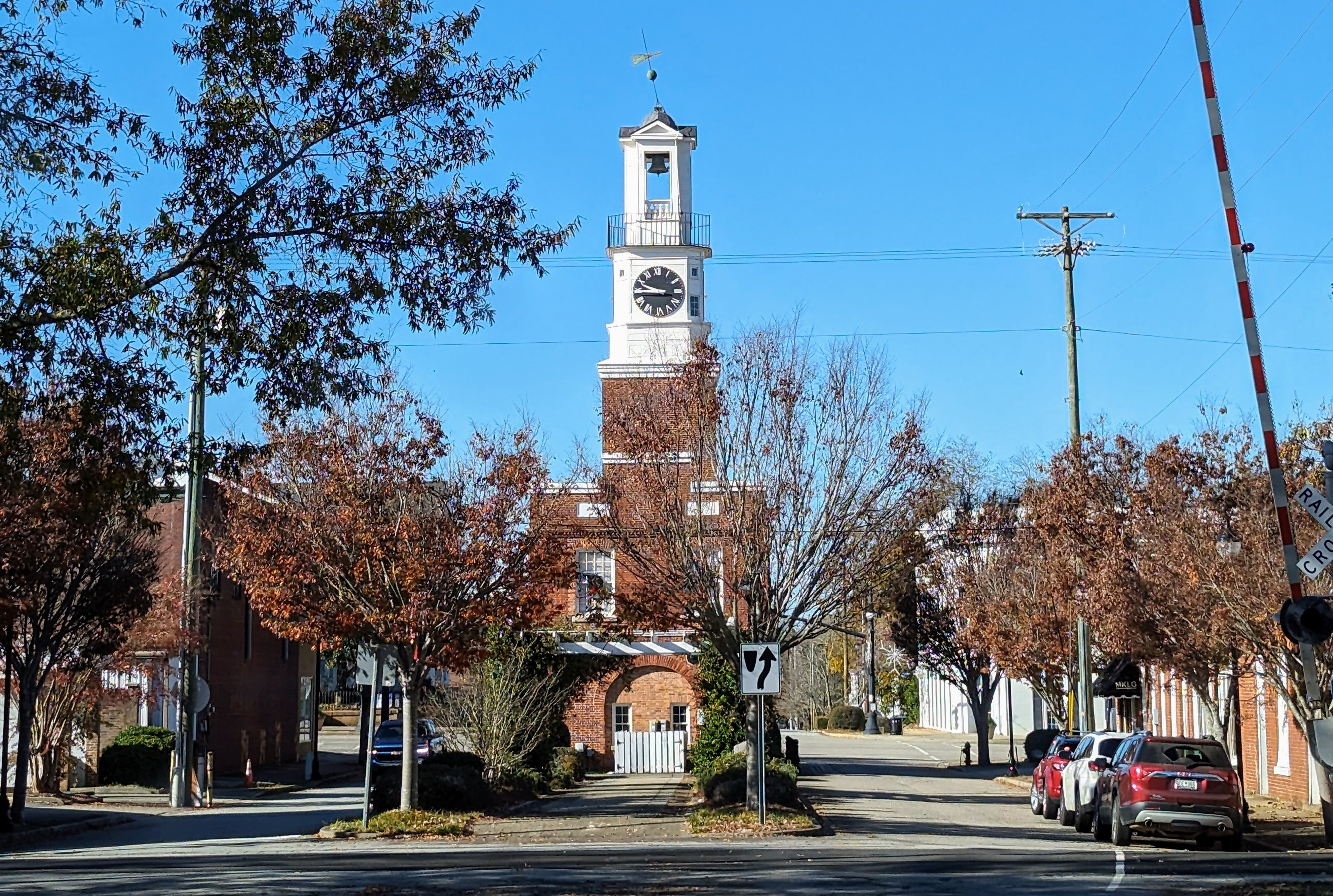
- Town clock, Winnsboro, South Carolina

- Seal
- Nickname: Rock City
- Motto: "A Town for All Time"
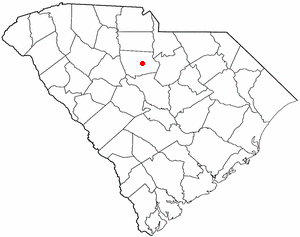
- Location of Winnsboro, South Carolina
- Coordinates: 34°22′37″N 81°5′17″W
- Country: United States
- State: South Carolina
- County: Fairfield

Government
  - Mayor: Demetrius Chatman

Area
  - Total: 3.53 sq mi (9.13 km^{2})
  - Land: 3.53 sq mi (9.13 km^{2})
  - Water: 0 sq mi (0.00 km^{2})
- Elevation: 535 ft (163 m)

Population (2020)
  - Total: 3,215
  - Density: 912.3/sq mi (352.23/km^{2})
- Time zone: UTC-5 (Eastern (EST))
  - Summer (DST): UTC-4 (EDT)
- ZIP code: 29180
- Area codes: 803, 839
- FIPS code: 45-78460
- GNIS feature ID: 2406903
- Website: www.townofwinnsboro.com

Winnsboro is a town in Fairfield County, South Carolina, United States. Its population was 3,550 at the 2010 census. The population was 3,215 at the 2020 census, a population decrease around 9.5% for the same 10-year period. It is the county seat of Fairfield County. Winnsboro is a suburb of Columbia and part of the Columbia, South Carolina metropolitan area.

== History ==
Based on archeological evidence, this area of the Piedmont was occupied by various cultures of indigenous peoples from as early as the Archaic period, about 1500 BC. Blair Mound is a nearby archeological site and earthwork likely occupied 1300–1400 AD, as part of the late Mississippian culture in the region.

Several years before the Revolutionary War, Richard Winn from Virginia moved to what is now Fairfield County in the upland or Piedmont area of South Carolina. His lands included the present site of Winnsboro. As early as 1777, the settlement was known as "Winnsborough", since he was the major landowner. His brothers John and Minor Winn joined him there, adding to family founders.

The village was laid out and chartered in 1785 upon petition of Richard and John Winn and John Vanderhorst. The brothers Richard, John, and Minor Winn all served in the Revolutionary War. Richard became a general, and was said to have fought in more battles than any Whig in South Carolina. John gained the rank of colonel. The area was developed for the cultivation of short-staple cotton after Eli Whitney's invention of the cotton gin in 1793, which made processing of this type of cotton profitable. Previously, it was considered too labor intensive. Short-staple cotton was widely cultivated on plantations in upland areas throughout the Deep South, through an interior area that became known as the Black Belt. The increased demand for slave labor resulted in the forced migration of more than one million African-American slaves into the area through sales in the domestic slave market. By the time of the Civil War, the county's population was majority black and majority slave.

Textile mills were constructed in the area beginning in the late 19th century, and originally only whites were allowed to work in the mills. "Winnsboro Cotton Mill Blues", an industrial folk song of the 1930s with lyrics typical of the blues, refers to working in a cotton mill in this city. The song arose after the textile mill had been converted to a tire-manufacturing plant, reflecting the widespread expansion of the auto industry. The song has been sung by Lead Belly, Pete Seeger, and other artists. It was the basis of one of the ballads by modernist composer/pianist Frederic Rzewski in his Four North American Ballads for solo piano, completed in 1979.

== Geography ==
US 321 Business passes through Winnsboro. The unincorporated community of Winnsboro Mills borders the south side of Winnsboro.

According to the United States Census Bureau, the town of Winnsboro has a total area of 3.2 square miles (8.4 km^{2}), all land.

=== Climate ===
Winnsboro has a humid subtropical climate (Köppen Cfa) with long, hot summers and short, mild winters.

Climate data for Winnsboro, South Carolina (1991–2020 normals, extremes 1896–present)
Month	Jan	Feb	Mar	Apr	May	Jun	Jul	Aug	Sep	Oct	Nov	Dec	Year
Record high °F (°C)	84 (29)	82 (28)	92 (33)	96 (36)	102 (39)	107 (42)	108 (42)	106 (41)	106 (41)	100 (38)	88 (31)	81 (27)	108 (42)
Mean maximum °F (°C)	71.3 (21.8)	74.5 (23.6)	82.2 (27.9)	87.2 (30.7)	91.7 (33.2)	96.9 (36.1)	98.5 (36.9)	97.5 (36.4)	93.1 (33.9)	85.9 (29.9)	78.1 (25.6)	72.0 (22.2)	100.0 (37.8)
Mean daily maximum °F (°C)	53.1 (11.7)	57.1 (13.9)	65.0 (18.3)	74.0 (23.3)	81.1 (27.3)	87.6 (30.9)	91.1 (32.8)	88.8 (31.6)	83.3 (28.5)	73.6 (23.1)	63.4 (17.4)	55.4 (13.0)	72.8 (22.6)
Daily mean °F (°C)	42.0 (5.6)	45.2 (7.3)	52.3 (11.3)	61.1 (16.2)	69.0 (20.6)	76.4 (24.7)	80.0 (26.7)	78.3 (25.7)	72.5 (22.5)	61.8 (16.6)	51.2 (10.7)	44.5 (6.9)	61.2 (16.2)
Mean daily minimum °F (°C)	30.9 (−0.6)	33.4 (0.8)	39.6 (4.2)	48.2 (9.0)	56.9 (13.8)	65.2 (18.4)	68.9 (20.5)	67.9 (19.9)	61.8 (16.6)	50.0 (10.0)	38.9 (3.8)	33.5 (0.8)	49.6 (9.8)
Mean minimum °F (°C)	16.6 (−8.6)	20.7 (−6.3)	25.6 (−3.6)	33.8 (1.0)	43.9 (6.6)	56.9 (13.8)	62.5 (16.9)	60.8 (16.0)	50.3 (10.2)	36.3 (2.4)	26.6 (−3.0)	21.9 (−5.6)	14.4 (−9.8)
Record low °F (°C)	−1 (−18)	−3 (−19)	5 (−15)	19 (−7)	29 (−2)	49 (9)	50 (10)	50 (10)	36 (2)	25 (−4)	11 (−12)	−1 (−18)	−3 (−19)
Average precipitation inches (mm)	3.99 (101)	3.59 (91)	4.03 (102)	3.10 (79)	3.07 (78)	4.05 (103)	4.10 (104)	4.69 (119)	3.88 (99)	3.29 (84)	3.19 (81)	4.14 (105)	45.12 (1,146)
Average snowfall inches (cm)	0.0 (0.0)	0.0 (0.0)	0.0 (0.0)	0.0 (0.0)	0.0 (0.0)	0.0 (0.0)	0.0 (0.0)	0.0 (0.0)	0.0 (0.0)	0.0 (0.0)	0.0 (0.0)	0.0 (0.0)	0 (0)
Average precipitation days (≥ 0.01 in)	10.6	9.8	9.2	8.6	8.4	10.1	9.9	11.0	8.0	7.1	8.5	10.6	111.8
Source: NOAA

== Demographics ==
Historical population
Census	Pop.	Note	%±
1860	355		—
1870	1,124		216.6%
1880	1,500		33.5%
1890	1,738		15.9%
1900	1,765		1.6%
1910	1,754		−0.6%
1920	1,822		3.9%
1930	2,344		28.6%
1940	3,181		35.7%
1950	3,267		2.7%
1960	3,479		6.5%
1970	3,411		−2.0%
1980	2,919		−14.4%
1990	3,475		19.0%
2000	3,599		3.6%
2010	3,550		−1.4%
2020	3,215		−9.4%
U.S. Decennial Census

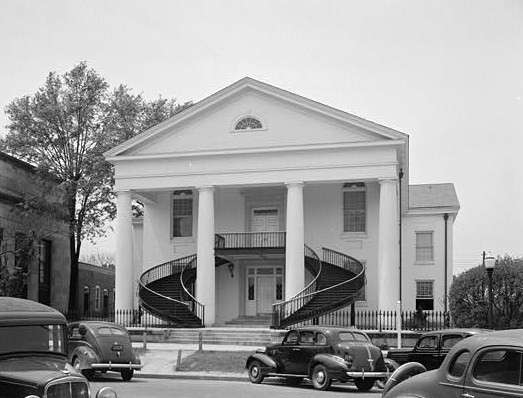
The Fairfield County Courthouse in 1940

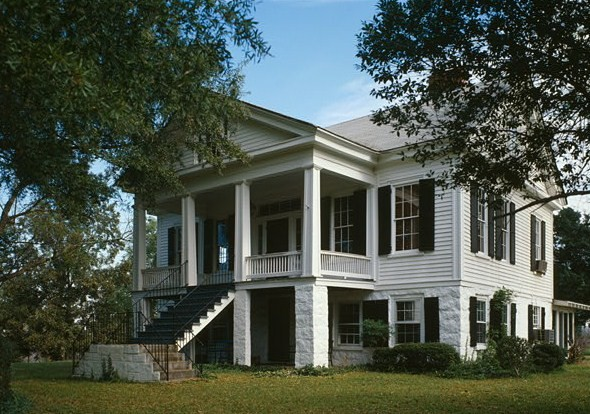
Tocaland is one of twenty-one sites in Winnsboro listed on the National Register of Historic Places.

=== 2020 census ===
Winnsboro racial composition
Race	Num.	Perc.
Black or African American (non-Hispanic)	1,926	59.91%
White (non-Hispanic)	1,078	33.53%
Native American	14	0.44%
Asian	26	0.81%
Pacific Islander	1	0.03%
Other/Mixed	89	2.77%
Hispanic or Latino	81	2.52%

As of the 2020 census, Winnsboro had a population of 3,215. The median age was 42.3 years. 22.1% of residents were under the age of 18 and 21.9% were 65 years of age or older. For every 100 females, there were 82.7 males, and for every 100 females age 18 and over, there were 76.2 males age 18 and over.

97.4% of residents lived in urban areas, while 2.6% lived in rural areas.

There were 1,452 households in Winnsboro, of which 30.2% had children under the age of 18 living in them. Of all households, 27.1% were married-couple households, 21.3% were households with a male householder and no spouse or partner present, and 45.2% were households with a female householder and no spouse or partner present. About 36.6% of all households were made up of individuals, and 17.6% had someone living alone who was 65 years of age or older. The census also counted 878 families residing in the town.

There were 1,653 housing units, of which 12.2% were vacant. The homeowner vacancy rate was 0.6%, and the rental vacancy rate was 5.5%.

=== 2010 census ===
As of the 2010 United States census, there were 3,550 people, 1,497 households, and 931 families residing in the town. The racial makeup of the town was 60.3% African American, 36.1% White, 0.2% Native American, 0.3% Asian, 0.1% from other races, and 1.0% from two or more races. Hispanic or Latino of any race were 2.0% of the population.

=== Crime ===
Based on data from the FBI Uniform Crime Reporting Program, Winnsboro is ranked 87% higher than the national average for violent crime, 26% higher than the national average for property crime, and 36% higher than the national average for total crime. The rate of crime in Winnsboro is 39.24 per 1,000 residents. The chance of being a victim of crime in Winnsboro may be as high as 1 in 17 in the central neighborhoods, or as low as 1 in 40 in the west part of the city. A crime occurs every 20 hours and 53 minutes (on average) in Winnsboro.

== Arts and culture ==
The Winnsboro Town Clock built in 1837 is the oldest continuously running clock in the United States.

Winnsboro has a public library, a branch of the Fairfield County Library.

== Government ==
The mayor of Winnsboro is Demetrius Chatman. The prior mayor McKeekein barely lost the race with 307 votes compared to Chatman's 366 votes.

== Education ==
Fairfield Institute, a school for African Americans run by a missionary from New Jersey was in Winnsboro from 1869 to 1888 when it closed and merged with Brainerd Institute in Chester, South Carolina. Joseph Winthrop Holley and Kelly Miller attended the school.

Winnsboro is served by the Fairfield County Public School system.

== Infrastructure ==
=== Law Enforcement ===
The Department of Public Safety was formed in 1986, combining the Police and Fire Departments together. The Department has operated as a Public Safety Department since. The Winnsboro Department of Public Safety has faced staffing issues related to retention in 2024. The department typically budgets for 18 officers, while currently only employing five certified officers and one fire dispatcher that year. To address the staffing shortages, particularly during the night shift, the town entered into an intergovernmental agreement with the Fairfield County Sheriff's Office. This arrangement was short lived, as staffing was improved to full staff in late 2024. Fire Fighters were also hired to boost fire service for the town. Current staffing is 6 Firefighters providing 24-hour coverage and 13 Police Officers. Requests for additional staffing is ongoing.

== Notable people ==
- D. Wyatt Aiken (1828–1887), U.S. congressman from South Carolina
- Mike Anderson, Baltimore Ravens running back
- Webster Anderson (1933–2003), U.S. Army Medal of Honor recipient for his actions in the Vietnam War
- John Bratton (1838–1898), Confederate general and U.S. congressman from South Carolina
- Walter B. Brown (1920–1998), former vice-president of Southern Railway
- William Porcher DuBose (1836–1918), educator in the Episcopal Church, and Civil War veteran
- William Ellison Jr., (1790–1861), born a mixed-race slave became a major planter in Sumter County.
- Gordon Glisson (1930–1997), champion jockey in thoroughbred horse racing
- Justin Hobgood, NASCAR driver
- James Hooker, singer/songwriter
- Ellis Johnson, college football coach
- Catherine Stratton Ladd (1808–1899) founder of Winnsboro Female Institute and journalist
- David Leventritt (1845–1926), New York City lawyer and judge, born in Winnsboro
- Donnie Levister, NASCAR driver
- James G. Martin, 70th governor of North Carolina (1985–1993)
- John Hugh Means (1812–1862), 64th governor of South Carolina (1850–1852)
- James Francis Miller (1830–1902), Texas politician in the U.S. House of Representatives
- Kelly Miller (1863–1939), African-American mathematician, sociologist and author
- James Milling, professional football player
- Joseph F. Rice (1954–2026), lawyer
- Thomas J. Robertson (1823–1897), U.S. senator from South Carolina
- Orlando Ruff, defensive lineman for the New Orleans Saints
- Alex Sanders, former Court of Appeals judge, College of Charleston president
- Miriam Stevenson, Miss South Carolina USA 1954, Miss USA 1954, Miss Universe 1954
- Tyler Thigpen, Buffalo Bills quarterback
- Joseph A. Woodward (1806–1885), congressman from South Carolina
