= William Porcher DuBose =

American priest, author, and theologian

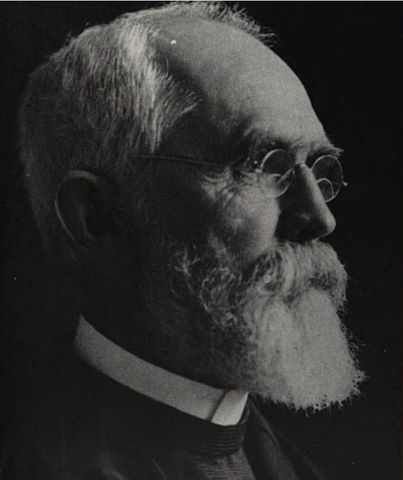

Priest, Theologian
- Born: April 11, 1836; Winnsboro, South Carolina, US
- Died: August 18, 1918; Sewanee, Tennessee, US
- Resting place: The University of the South cemetery
- Venerated in: Episcopal Church (USA) (formerly)
- Feast: formerly 18 August (removed June 27, 2024)

William Porcher DuBose (April 11, 1836 – August 18, 1918) was an American priest, author, and theologian in the Episcopal Church in the United States. After service in the Confederate States Army during the American Civil War, in which he became a chaplain in his cousin's regiment, DuBose served as a Professor, Chaplain, and Dean of Theology at the University of the South in Sewanee, Tennessee. Later he served as Chaplain at Fairmount College in Monteagle, Tennessee (currently the DuBose Conference Center, named after William Porcher DuBose) and as priest-in-charge at the nearby Chapel of the Holy Comforter.

== Early life and education ==
In 1836, William Porcher DuBose was born near Winnsboro, Fairfield County, South Carolina (near Columbia, South Carolina) to the former Jane Sinkler Porcher (Porcher is French and pronounced as if spelled por-shay) and her husband, Capt. Theodore Samuel DuBose. Both sides of his family were descended from French Huguenots who had immigrated as religious refugees in 1686 and settled in the Midlands of South Carolina. DuBose grew up on the 2,500-acre (10 km^{2}) family plantation near Winnsboro; his parents were planters and major slaveholders, owning 204 slaves in 1860. His great-uncle William DuBose (1787 or 1788 - 1855) was also a planter and major slaveholder; he was elected as South Carolina's lieutenant-governor. W. P. DuBose was privately educated, including at Mount Zion College, a private male academy in Winnsboro. Later he taught there.

At age 15, DuBose entered the South Carolina Military Academy (now known as The Citadel) in 1851. By his final year (1855), he was the ranking officer as well as Assistant Professor of English. He graduated from SCMA in 1855 "with first honors".

While at The Citadel, DuBose had his "conversion experience":

I lept to my feet trembling, and then that happened that I can only describe by saying that a light shone about me and a Presence filled the room. At the same time, ineffable joy and peace took possession of me which it is impossible to either express or explain.

In 1856, DuBose entered the University of Virginia, graduating with a Master of Arts degree in 1859. Later that year, he entered the just-opened South Carolina diocesan seminary in Camden, South Carolina.

== Confederate States Army ==
When the American Civil War began, DuBose left the seminary. He enlisted with South Carolina's Holcombe Legion, and accepted an appointment as its adjutant. The legion fought at the Second Battle of Bull Run, where DuBose was injured twice. For part of 1862, DuBose was a prisoner of war before being exchanged. He was wounded again in December of the same year.

In 1863, family friends and church contacts helped DuBose gain a commission as a chaplain. After he was ordained a deacon at Grace Church in Camden, South Carolina in December 1863, he joined Kershaw's Brigade as its chaplain in Greeneville, Tennessee. It was led by his lawyer cousin Dudley M. DuBose, who was raised in Tennessee.

== Ministry ==
After the war, on September 9, 1866, DuBose was ordained a priest in the Episcopal Church by Bishop Thomas F. Davis. (He had aligned with the Protestant Episcopal Church in the Confederate States of America during the conflict, when his brother served as Attorney General of the Confederacy). DuBose served St. John's Parish, Fairfield, which included St. Stephen's Episcopal Church and St. John's Episcopal Church in Winnsboro. While there, DuBose also taught Greek at his alma mater, Mt. Zion College.

In January 1868, DuBose was called as rector of Trinity Church in Abbeville, South Carolina. At the diocesan convention in 1870, he was considered to be a serious contender to succeed Bp. Davis, which DuBose later considered a "fortunate escape".

In July 1871, Vice-Chancellor Charles Todd Quintard nominated DuBose to serve as Chaplain of the newly established University of the South and Professor of the School of Moral Science and the Evidences of the Christian Religion. DuBose served as Chaplain of the school from 1871-1883 (he was succeeded by Thomas Frank Gailor). He helped to establish the Theological Department at the university, which would later be known as the School of Theology at the University of the South. A professor in the Theological Department from 1877-1893, DuBose was elected Dean of the Theological Department. He served in that position from 1894 until retiring in 1908. He has been described as possibly the "greatest theologian that the Episcopal Church in the USA has produced."

== Marriages, Family, and Later Life ==
While on leave from the military, on April 30, 1863, DuBose married Anne Barnwell Peronneau of Charleston, South Carolina. They had four children before her death. (The South Carolina Biographical Dictionary says that she died in 1873 and that he married Louisa Yerger in 1878.)

In 1878 Dr. DuBose married Mrs. Louise Yerger, headmistress at Fairmount College for Young Ladies in Monteagle, Tennessee at a service held in the parlor of the school. He also became chaplain to the school and priest in charge of the nearby Chapel of the Holy Comforter. Upon his retirement from the faculty of the University, DuBose lived at Fairmount College and cared for the religious needs of the school and of the townspeople, riding horseback up to Gruetli, a distance of some twenty miles twice a month to perform services for the Swiss inhabitants in the area. One Sunday he would conduct the service in German and the next Sunday he would do the same in French.

It was during this period of his life, while caring for the little chapel in Monteagle and serving at Fairmount, that DuBose wrote some of his greatest literature. After his retirement in 1908, he wrote High Priesthood and Sacrifice, The Reason of Life, and an autobiography, Turning Points in My Life, from his study in Monteagle. He remained at the School until this death in 1918.

DuBose's sister Elizabeth DuBose (1838-1875) married John Bratton, a Winnsville doctor who had graduated from South Carolina College. He became a planter, and was commissioned as an officer in the Confederate Army. He achieved the final rank of general, and led troops in both the Eastern and Western theaters during the conflict. Afterward, Bratton became a politician, being elected to the South Carolina Senate. He was later elected as the South Carolina Comptroller and ultimately as U.S. Congressman from South Carolina.

== Death and honors ==
DuBose died in Sewanee, Tennessee in 1918; he was buried in the cemetery of The University of the South.

The DuBose Conference Center in Monteagle, Tennessee, formerly Fairmont College and long associated with the Episcopal Church as a training center, was added to the National Register of Historic Places in 1980. In 2009, it became an independent nonprofit corporation. The Center offers hospitality and sacred space to groups of all faiths.

In 2022, the DuBose Conference Center was closed permanently.

William Porcher DuBose was formerly honored with a Lesser Feast on the liturgical calendar of the Episcopal Church in the United States of America on August 18. On July 10, 2022, at the 80th General Convention of the Episcopal Church, the House of Deputies and the House of Bishops approved resolution C003, which removed William Porcher DuBose from the Lesser Feasts and Fasts Calendar on a trial basis due to his writings in support of white supremacy and the KKK. In an explanatory note to the resolution it was stated, "The Episcopal Church should not be honoring a man who saw no conflict in teaching Jesus, but believing that Jesus would somehow condone the enslaving, killing, torturing and destroying of the families of a people, slaves or free."

On June 27, 2024, the 81st General Convention confirmed DuBose’s removal from the calendar of the Episcopal Church by a nearly unanimous vote.

== Writings ==
- The Christian Ministry. no publisher, 1870.
- The Soteriology of the New Testament. New York: MacMillan, 1892.
- The Ecumenical Councils. New York: Christian Literature Co., 1896.
- The Gospel in the Gospels. New York: Longmans, Green, & Co., 1906.
- High Priesthood and Sacrifice. New York: Longmans, Green, & Co., 1908.
- The Reason of Life. New York: Longmans, Green, & Co., 1911.
- Turning Points in My Life. New York: Longmans, Green, & Co., 1912
- More than 40 published articles.
- A Dubose Reader, ed. Donald S. Armentrout. Sewanee, TN: University of the South, 1984.

== See also ==
- Bibliographic directory from Project Canterbury
- Ralph Luker, author of A Southern Tradition in Theology and Social Criticism, 1830-1930: The Religious Liberalism and Social Conservatism of James Warley Miles, William Porcher DuBose, and Edgar Gardner Murphy. Mellen Press (1984) Hardcover: ISBN 0-88946-655-6, ISBN 978-0-88946-655-5.
- Edgar Gardner Murphy
