= Harriet B. Kells =

American Prohibition leader, editor; suffragist (1841–1913)

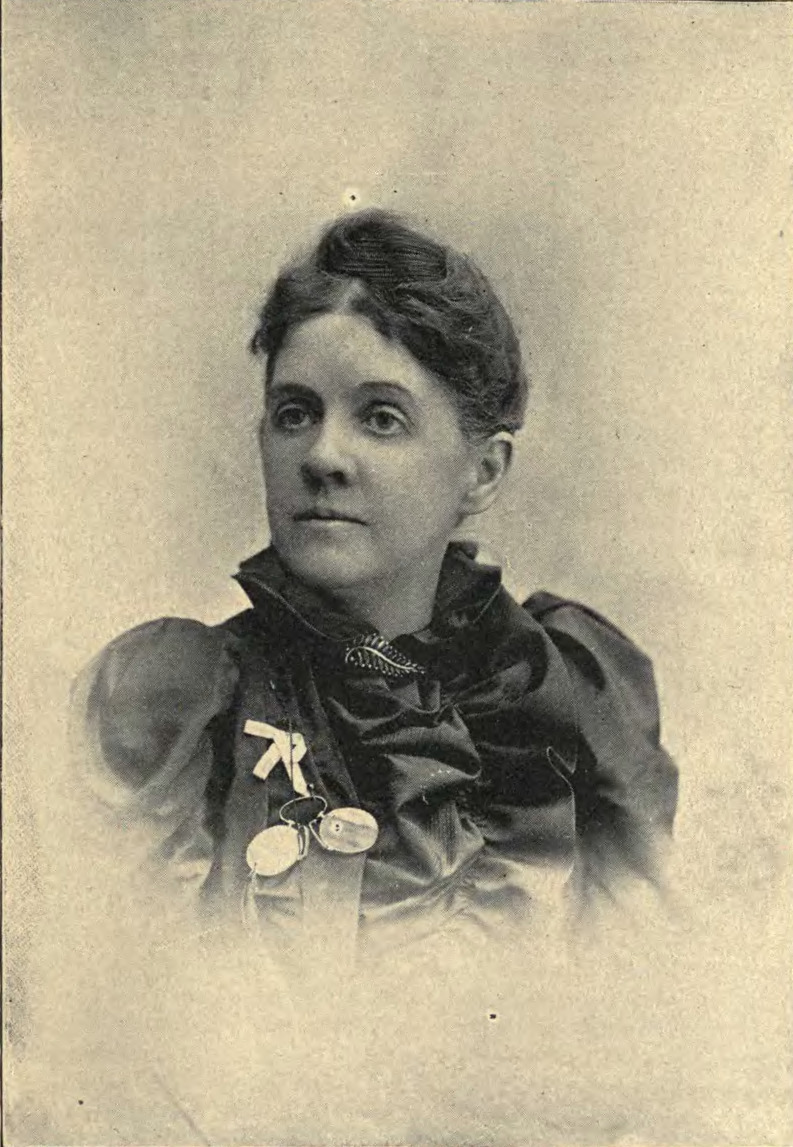
- Portrait from Thumbnail sketches (1895)
- Born: Harriet Barfield Coulson; April 19, 1842; Natchez, Mississippi, U.S.
- Died: December 26, 1913 (aged 71); Starkville, Mississippi
- Other names: nickname, "Hattie"
- Occupations: educator; activist; editor; suffragist; feminist
- Known for: President, Mississippi State Woman's Christian Temperance Union
- Spouse: William Henry Kells (m. 1864, divorced)

Harriet B. Kells (née Coulson; 1842–1913) was an American educator and temperance activist. She served as President of the Mississippi State Woman's Christian Temperance Union (WCTU) and edited the National WCTU's organ. Kells was also a suffragist affiliated with the Mississippi Equal Rights Association, and a Reconstruction feminist.

== Early life and education ==
Harriet (nickname, "Hattie") Barfield Coulson was born in Natchez, Mississippi, on April 19, 1842. Her parents were John Samuel Coulson (b. 1813) and Eliza Jane (Barfield) Coulson (b. 1817). Harriet's siblings were Anne, Emma, James, Mary, Joseph, Samuel, William, Benjamin, and Frances.

She was educated at the Mississippi Female Institute and the Springfield Seminary.

== Career ==
In 1864, she married William Henry Kells, at Natchez. She then served as a principal at Pass Christian, Mississippi, and was for a time principal of the leading girls’ school at Jackson, Mississippi.

In 1872, Kells, divorced and a single mother, united with a friend, Louise Yerger, in moving their girls' college from Jackson to Monteagle, Tennessee where it was named Fairmount College. In 1885, she founded and became principal of the Tennessee Diocesan School for Young Women. Two years later, she was appointed professor of physiology and zoology at the Industrial Institute and College for the Education of White Girls (now Mississippi University for Women) in Columbus, Mississippi.

After a career of 18 years in education work, Kells entered the journalistic field in 1888, where she was active in Mississippi and Chicago until failing health compelled her to move to Roswell, New Mexico. Here she formed a women's club and supported a free reading-room, which became a Carnegie library. She served for two years (1899–1900) as corresponding secretary of the Mississippi Equal Rights Association, and during the Constitutional Convention of 1890, advocated the enfranchisement of educated women to counteract the illiterate vote in the country.

Kells' temperance activities began in 1885, when she became affiliated with the WCTU. She served for a time as superintendent of Temperance Instruction for the Mississippi Union, and in 1909, was elected president of the State body, which position she held till her death in 1913.

In recognition of her journalistic ability displayed in founding (1888) and editing the Mississippi White Ribbon, the organ of the State WCTU, Kells was called to Chicago in 1891 to accept a position on the editorial staff of The Union Signal, the official organ of the National WCTU. She retired from The Union Signal in 1894, to engage in business in the south, where the climate was more conducive to her health, located at Fort Worth, Texas.

Throughout this period, she was working untiringly for the enactment of temperance legislation. In 1902, she appealed to the Mississippi Legislature for the passage of a State Prohibition bill, which was later defeated by only two votes. In preparation for the next Prohibition contest, waged two years later, she conducted numerous campaigns throughout her native State in which she greatly aided the spread of temperance sentiment. She lived to see the enactment of several of her most important bills, although she did not witness the passage of the Eighteenth Amendment, for which she had worked so hard.

She returned to editing the Mississippi White Ribbon in 1902, first in Fayette, Mississippi, and then in Jackson.

== Later life and death ==
Kells literally died at her post: she was at her desk when stricken with the paralysis which caused her death. Harriet B. Kells died December 26, 1913, in her boarding house at Starkville, Mississippi.

== Selected works ==
- "New Mexico as a Health Resort"
