= Alpha Kappa Psi (sorority) =

Defunct American collegiate sorority

- ΑΚΨ
- Founded: March 1, 1900; 126 years ago Saint Mary's School in Raleigh, North Carolina
- Type: Social
- Affiliation: Independent
- Status: Defunct
- Defunct date: c. 1920
- Successor: Delta Delta Delta and scattered
- Scope: North America
- Motto: "Ever upward""
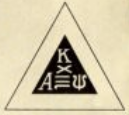
- Member badge
- Colors: Wedgewood Blue and Gold
- Symbol: skull and bones
- Flower: Forget-me-not
- Publication: Trigonon
- Chapters: 13 chartered, 0 active
- Members: 487 lifetime
- Headquarters: Raleigh, North Carolina; United States

Alpha Kappa Psi (ΑΚΨ) was an American college sorority. It was established in 1900 at Saint Mary's School in Raleigh, North Carolina. The sorority established thirteen chapters before going defunct in 1920. At its dissolution, several chapters joined Delta Delta Delta.

== History ==
On March 1, 1900, Alpha Kappa Psi was founded as the first Greek letter sorority on the campus of Saint Mary's School in Raleigh, North Carolina. Rev. Theodore DuBose Bratton, eventual bishop of Mississippi, assisted his students with the creation of the sorority. Its purpose was to "foster the highest ideals of Christian womanhood". The first initiation was held in 1901.

In 1904, Alpha Kappa Psi was incorporated as a national sorority. Beta chapter was chartered at Virginia Female Institute in Staunton, Virginia, later called Stuart Hall. The next eight years were the heyday of the sorority. In 1907, the sorority had forty active members and seventy total initiates at three chapters. Chapters were chartered at schools in Florida, Georgia, South Carolina, Washington, D.C., and Pennsylvania. The Alpha chapter disbanded in 1911, when rector Dr. George W. Lay abolished all sororities at Saint Mary's. The Beta chapter existed for only five years, from 1904 to 1909.

Baird's Manual of American College Fraternities (1912) categorized Alpha Kappa Psi with "other women's general fraternities", such as Alpha Chi Omega and Alpha Omicron Pi. Seven active chapters were listed at this stage, with total active sisters at 304.

The 1915 publication of Baird's categorized the sorority in the "second division" of women's fraternities. Within a few years, a distinction would be made between the senior status sororities and junior status sororities that had been emerging, as a way of distinguishing smaller nationals or those that served non-accredited colleges. At the time of publication of this issue, Alpha Kappa Psi had five active chapters and five inactive chapters, with a total membership of 377. Two chapters left to affiliate with Delta Delta Delta.

Alpha Kappa Psi, a junior college sorority as of 1916, granted releases to chapters at four-year colleges that chose to affiliate with a larger national organization. These included Wesleyan Female College, Florida State College for Women, and Stetson University. By 1920, the sorority was recategorized as one of the "miscellaneous fraternities" in Baird's Manual. Four remaining active chapters were listed:

- Fairmount College (Monteagle, TN)
- Carnegie Institute of Technology (Pittsburgh, PA)
- Gunston Hall School (Washington, DC)
- Synodical College (Fulton, MO)

The sorority had an approximate total of 487 members. Although the date of national dissolution is unknown, Alpha Kappa Psi dispersed sometime after 1920. Out of its legacy, three chapters joined Delta Delta Delta sorority, and one chapter joined Chi Omega.

== Symbols and traditions ==
The open motto of Alpha Kappa Psi was "Ever Upward." Its official symbol or insignia was the skull and bones. Its colors were blue and gold, specifically Wedgwood blue and gold. The sorority's flower was the forget-me-not.

There are two different descriptions of the Alpha Kappa Psi badge. One describes the badge as an equilateral Wedgwood blue and gold triangle with the sorority's Greek letters in the angles. The other describes it as "a triangle divided into three panels, one displaying a scroll carrying a skull and bones, one a key, and the third a torch". The sorority's flag was a Wedgwood blue pennant bearing the badge in gold.

The sorority's official publication was the Trigonon. It was published from December 1909 through 1911.

== Conventions ==
Alpha Kappa Psi held an annual national convention from 1909 through 1914. Conventions were held as follows:

- Asheville, North Carolina, 1909
- Atlanta, Georgia, 1910
- Charleston, South Carolina, 1911
- Jacksonville, Florida, 1912
- Washington, D.C., 1914

== Chapters ==
Following is a list of the chapters of Alpha Kappa Psi, with inactive chapters and institutions are indicated in italics.

Chapter	Charter date and range	Institution	Location	Status	Ref.
Alpha	March 1, 1900 – 1911	Saint Mary's School	Raleigh, North Carolina	Inactive	(Note: Saint Mary's College operated as a boarding high school and junior college, but discontinued its college in 1998.)
Beta I	1905–1909	Stuart Hall School	Staunton, Virginia	Inactive	(Note: Stuart Hall was originally a preparatory school and high school.)
Tau	1906–191x ?	Fairmount College	Monteagle, Tennessee	Inactive	(Note: The college was previously known as Fairmount School for Girls and Fairmount School for Young Ladies and was eventually renamed as a college. It provided "3 or 4 years of preparatory work toward a degree". It closed in 1918. This Tennessee institution should not be confused with Fairmont Seminary in Washington, D.C.)
Delta	1907–1913	Wesleyan Female College	Macon, Georgia	Withdrew (ΔΔΔ)	(Note: Wesleyan Female College shortened its name to Wesleyan College in 1917.) (Note: Chapter became the Alpha Gamma chapter of Delta Delta Delta, which survived until 1916.)
Eta	1908–1916	Florida State College for Women	Tallahassee, Florida	Withdrew (ΔΔΔ)	(Note: Chapter became the Alpha Eta chapter of Delta Delta Delta.)
Sigma Nu	1909–1913	Stetson University	Deland, Florida	Withdrew (ΔΔΔ)	(Note: Chapter became the Alpha Delta chapter of Delta Delta Delta.)
Kappa I	1909–1910	Beaver College (Arcadia)	Glenside, Pennsylvania	Inactive	
Zeta	1911–1912	Gunston Hall School	Washington, DC	Inactive	
Gamma	1911–1912	Shorter College	Rome, Georgia	Inactive	
Beta II	1911–19xx ?	Fitzhugh School	Fort Worth, Texas	Inactive	
Kappa II	1911–1928	Carnegie Institute of Technology	Pittsburgh, Pennsylvania	Withdrew (local)	(Note: Chapter operated as a local fraternity until it became the Omicron Delta chapter of Chi Omega in 1944.)
Epsilon	1913–1916	Synodical College	Fulton, Missouri	Inactive	(Note: Synodical College ceased operations in 1928.)
Theta	1912–after 1915	Knight's School, The Cathedral School for Girls	Havana, Cuba	Inactive	
Lambda	1914–after 1915	Ward-Belmont College	Nashville, Tennessee	Inactive	(Note: Ward-Belmont College ceased operations in 1951.)

=== Alumnae Associations ===
Alpha Kappa Psi had the following alumni chapters:

- Tampa Alumnae
- Atlanta Alumnae
- Camden Alumnae
- Savannah Alumnae
- Portsmouth Alumnae
- Macon Alumnae

== See also ==
- List of social sororities and women's fraternities
