= Panthea Twitty =

American historian

Panthea Massenburg Twitty (September 7, 1912 – October 21, 1977) was an American photographer, ceramist, and historian.

Born in Warrenton, North Carolina, Twitty was the daughter of Nancy B. White and John B. Massenburg. She was educated locally and at Saint Mary's Junior College in Raleigh before studying art in White Plains, New York; she also attended Columbia University, Cooper Union, and the Georgiana Studio of Design.

She was active in the United Daughters of the Confederacy, chairing its committee on monuments and markers, compiling historical records, and writing for some of its programs. In 1957 she produced a Confederate History of Warren County; she also supplied research and photographs for other writers. She was certified by the National Ceramics Association, and taught ceramics at the Halifax Technical Institute and Vance-Granville Community College.

She lived in a house called Reedy Hill in Warren County, where she operated a ceramics shop. Twitty, an Episcopalian, married Henry Fitts Twitty II in 1941; with him she had two children, Panthea Anne (Crawford) and William Henry. She is buried in Warrenton.
