= DuBose Conference Center =

- DuBose Conference Center or DuBose Church Training Center
- U.S. National Register of Historic Places
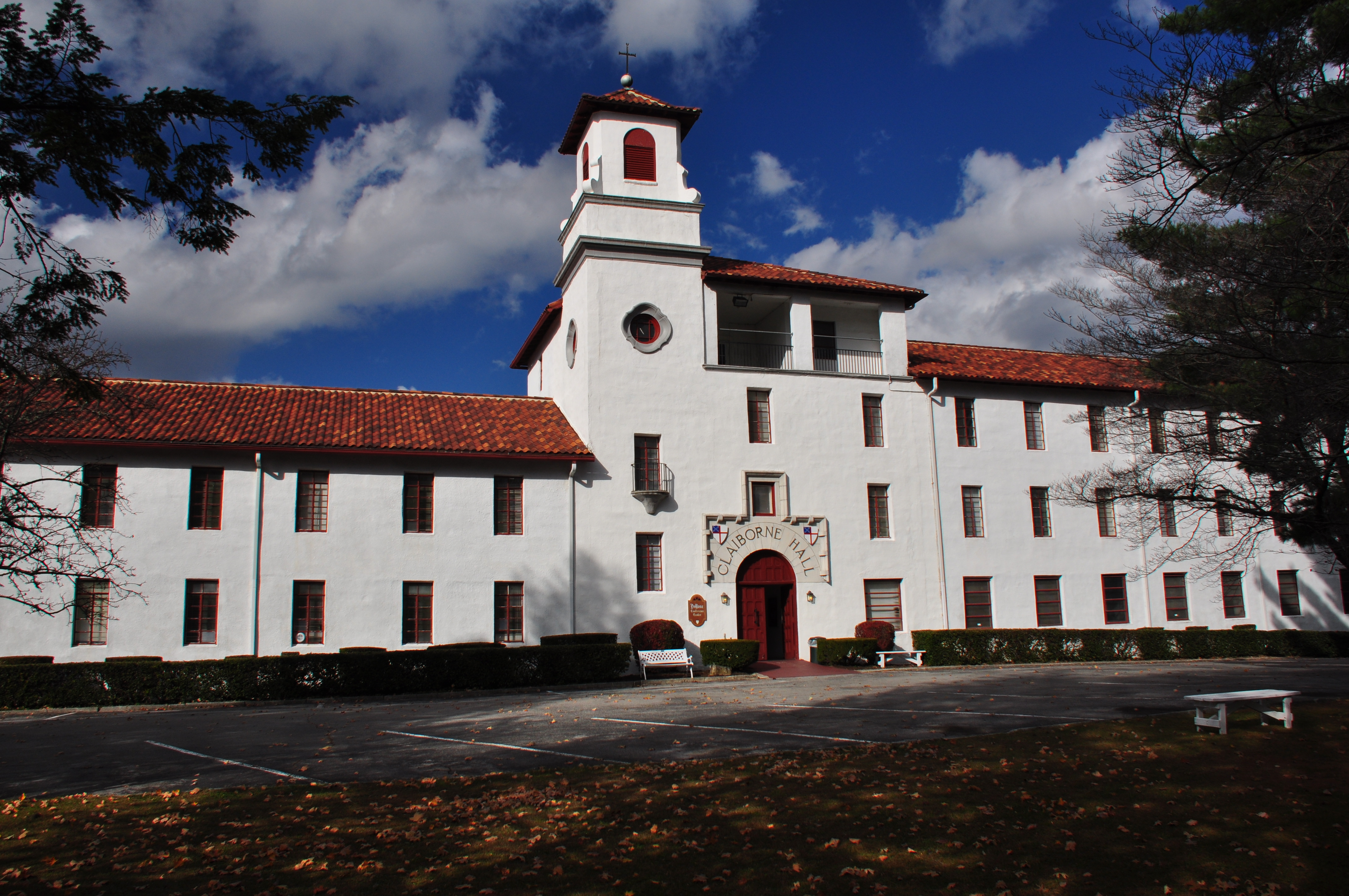
- DuBose Memorial Church Training School, November 2014.

- Location within Tennessee Location within the United States
- Location: 635 College Street, Monteagle, Tennessee
- Coordinates: 35°14′29″N 85°49′38″W
- Area: 1.4 acres (0.57 ha)
- Built: 1924
- Architect: Multiple
- Architectural style: Mission/Spanish Revival
- MPS: Grundy County MRA (AD)
- NRHP reference No.: 80003802
- Added to NRHP: November 25, 1980

The DuBose Conference Center, officially the DuBose Memorial Church Training School, is a historic site and former conference center associated with the Episcopal Church at Fairmont and College Streets in Monteagle, Tennessee, United States. It was historically an Episcopal Church training and conference center. On April 29, 2023, the conference center permanently ceased operations when the Episcopal Diocese of Tennessee deconsecrated the property. The mission of DuBose Conference Center was to "offer hospitality, programming, and sacred space to groups of all faiths and backgrounds for education, creativity, and renewal."

== History of DuBose Conference Center ==
=== 1921 to 1944: DuBose Memorial Church Training School ===
In 1921, Reverend William Stirling Claiborne (1877-1933) and Dr. Mercer P. Logan founded the DuBose Memorial Church Training School on the former site of Fairmount College. Its curriculum emphasized practical rather than scholarly teaching, including such courses as “The Bible in English,” “Church History,” and “The Contents and Use of the Book of Common Prayer.” In addition to living at DuBose, many of them with established families, they raised vegetables and cattle to help maintain the school and its buildings.

The center's main building, Claiborne Hall, was rebuilt in 1924 after a large fire burned the school's original frame building.

=== 1950s to 2023: DuBose Conference Center ===
In the early 1950s, the Episcopal Diocese of Tennessee (which at that time encompassed the Episcopal Diocese of West Tennessee, the Episcopal Diocese of Tennessee (sometimes referred to as "the Episcopal Diocese of Middle Tennessee"), and the Episcopal Diocese of East Tennessee) purchased the buildings and grounds of the old Church Training School and reopened as the DuBose Conference Center. In 1953, Camp Gailor-Maxon, an Episcopal youth camp established in the 1920s, moved from its earlier venues to find a permanent home as an in-house program at DuBose.

The Diocese began capital improvements to the school, including the construction of four new cabins and a swimming pool. In 1958, a new outdoor pavilion was constructed to accommodate the growing Laymen’s Conference of the Episcopal Churchmen of Tennessee. The Diocese of Tennessee built Bishop's Hall, a hotel-style lodging facility, in 1973 and expanded the “Stack Room” in the Pell Library Building to create the Large Chapel. In 1975 Camp Gailor-Maxon constructed the outdoor chapel and campfire area. Four cabins for housing youth and camp groups were also constructed.

DuBose Conference Center was added to the National Register of Historic Places in 1980.

In the early 1990s a decision was made to reconfigure the board to include several “at large” members who would represent constituent user groups of the center; and to actively pursue increased utilization by other denominations and secular groups to improve business results.

In 2009, the conference center elected to transition to a 501(c)3 Nonprofit organization but still affiliated with the three Tennessee Episcopal Dioceses and was run by a 21-member Board of Directors.

Another in-house program, Winterfest, was established in 2006 for high school aged Episcopalians throughout the state of Tennessee. In 2016 an on-site farm-to-table garden was established. This laid the foundation for the creation of a third in-house program in 2019, Healthy Roots, which focuses on health and wellness outreach and serves the nearby South Cumberland Plateau communities of Grundy County, Franklin County, and Marion County.

=== Closure of DuBose Conference Center ===
On April 29, 2023, the conference center permanently ceased operations when the Episcopal Diocese of Tennessee deconsecrated the property. Reasons cited included decreased demand for camp and conference facilities, with the additional challenges that DuBose faced during the COVID-19 pandemic.

== DuBose Conference Center Namesake ==
DuBose Conference Center was named after William Porcher DuBose, an American priest, author, and theologian in The Episcopal Church in the United States who married Mrs. Louise Yerger, headmistress at Fairmount College and served as the school's Chaplain. It was during this period of DuBose's life, while caring for the little chapel in Monteagle and serving at Fairmount, that Dr. DuBose wrote some of his greatest literature. After his retirement in 1908, he wrote a number of books which established him as a "major New Testament theologian" from his study in Monteagle. He remained at the School until this death in 1918.
