= Mary Anderson (inventor) =

American inventor (1866–1953)

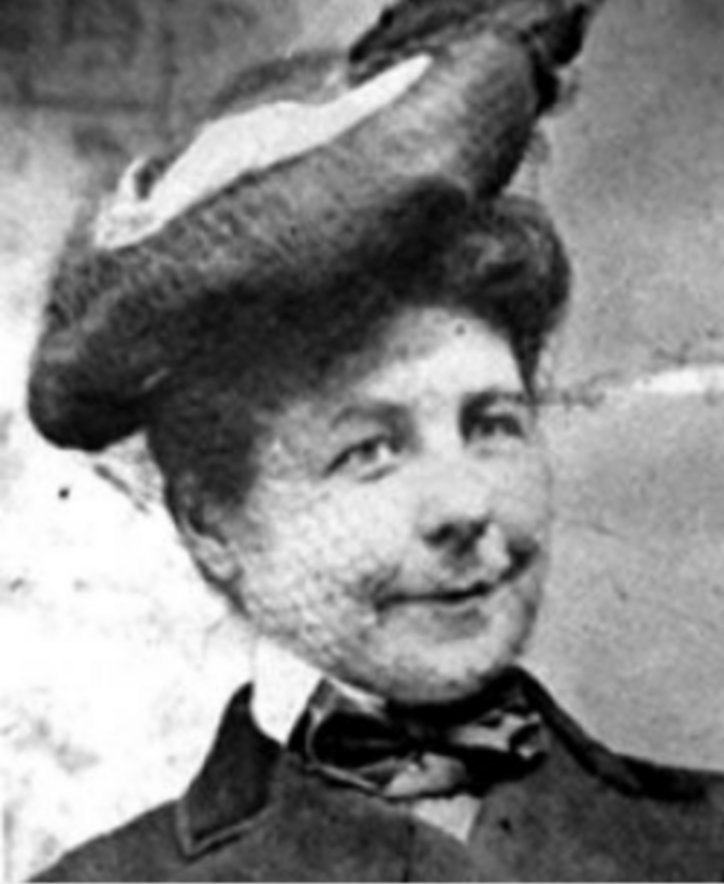
- Anderson, c. 1910
- Born: Mary Anderson; February 19, 1866; Greene County, Alabama
- Died: June 27, 1953 (aged 87); Monteagle, Tennessee
- Occupations: Real estate developer, rancher, viticulturist, inventor
- Known for: Invention of the windshield wiper (1903)
- Awards: National Inventors Hall of Fame

Mary Elizabeth Anderson (February 19, 1866 – June 27, 1953) was an American inventor and entrepreneur credited with inventing the first operational windshield wiper. She was born in Greene County, Alabama, and later became known as a real-estate developer in Birmingham as well as the operator of a cattle ranch and vineyard in California. In her 1903 U.S. patent, Anderson described her design as a “window cleaning device for electric cars and other vehicles,” a hand-operated mechanism using a blade to clear snow, ice, or sleet from the windshield. The U.S. Patent Office awarded her Patent No. 743,801 on November 10, 1903 for this device. Anderson’s idea supposedly arose while she was riding a streetcar in New York City on a snowy day and saw the driver repeatedly open the window or stop the car to wipe the glass by hand in order to see. She responded by designing a lever-operated arm with a rubber blade that could be moved across the outside of the windshield from inside the vehicle, keeping the driver protected from the weather.

Although Anderson attempted to sell or license the patent, including an approach to a Canadian manufacturing firm, potential buyers rejected the device as lacking commercial value at a time when automobiles were still relatively rare. Her 17-year patent expired in 1920 without having been put into mass production. By the early 1920s, however, mechanical windshield wipers had become standard equipment on many passenger cars, and by 1922 Cadillac was installing wipers as standard features, using designs that followed the basic principles of Anderson’s device. Her mechanism is now widely recognized as the first effective windshield-clearing device and a blueprint for modern wiper systems, even though this impact only became clear in retrospect. In 2011, decades after her death, Anderson was inducted into the National Inventors Hall of Fame for her pioneering contribution to transportation safety.

== Early life ==
Mary Anderson was born on February 19, 1866, at Burton Hill Plantation in Greene County, Alabama, to John C. and Rebecca Anderson. She was one of at least two daughters and remained close throughout her life to her sister Fannie. Her father died in 1870, and accounts note that the family was able to live on the proceeds of his estate, which provided financial stability during her childhood. Little documentation survives regarding Anderson’s formal education, and several biographical sources state that her schooling and early training are unknown.

In 1889, Anderson moved with her widowed mother and sister to Birmingham, Alabama, which was then developing rapidly as an industrial center. Soon after their arrival, the family financed and built the Fairmont Apartments on Highland Avenue (also described as 21st Street South), and Anderson became involved in real-estate development and property management there.

In 1893, Anderson left Birmingham and relocated to Fresno, California, where she operated a cattle ranch and vineyard for several years. Around 1898, she returned to Birmingham to help care for an ailing aunt and moved back into the Fairmont Apartments with her mother, her sister Fannie, and Fannie’s husband, G. P. Thornton. According to later retellings, the aunt brought with her a large trunk filled with gold and jewelry, and the sale of these valuables allowed the family to live in considerable comfort while Anderson continued to manage the apartment building and pursue her business interests.

== Invention (windshield wipers) ==
In 1903, it rarely occurred to anyone that rain on a moving vehicle’s windshield was a problem that could be eliminated. It was something drivers simply accepted and dealt with in their own ways, usually by stopping every once in a while and manually scraping off the windshield moisture that was causing them to see poorly while they were driving. Mary Anderson changed all of that with her invention of the windshield wiper, an idea that leapt into her mind as she traveled from Alabama to New York City.

Around 1900, it is said that Anderson came into a large inheritance from an aunt. Eager to make exciting use of the money, she took a trip to New York City during the thick of winter in 1903. During her trip, Anderson had a hard time seeing the sights because of harsh weather. Her driver even had a hard time seeing clearly too. In order to see, her driver drove with both windows open and would wipe down the snow and ice off the windshields with his hands. Anderson decided this method could be improved. In 1902, she visited New York City in the winter. Anderson sat in a trolley car on a frosty day. Anderson observed that the trolley car driver struggled to see past the windows because of the falling sleet. Every few minutes, the driver had to reach through an opening in the glass to wipe the snow off the windshield. The trolley car’s front window was designed for bad-weather visibility, but its multi-pane windshield system worked very poorly. Therefore, to clear the sights, the driver needed to open the window, lean out of the vehicle, or stop the car to go outside in order to wipe the windscreen with his or her hands. Anderson observed the agitated and uncomfortable behavior of the vehicle’s cold driver, who had to rely on all sorts of tricks like sticking his head out of the window, stopping the vehicle to clean the windshield in order to see where he was driving. Anderson, who was not an engineer but an entrepreneur, identified the problem and its opportunity. She envisioned a windshield wiper blade that the trolley driver could operate from the inside. At that time, it rarely occurred to anyone else to eliminate the problem; it was something drivers simply accepted and dealt with.

As a Southern woman, Anderson found the problem of the shivering driver novel to her and when she returned to Alabama, the problem stuck with her. When she returned to Alabama, she drew up a sketch for a wiper blade that could be operated from inside a vehicle and wrote up the description. Her original solution was a “squeegee blade with a spindle attached to one end that passed through a hole in the top corner of the windscreen frame and was attached to a handle on the inside. Later, as technology developed, windshield wipers were powered by engine vacuum or by electric motors but they are still squeegees on spindles. She also hired a designer for a hand-operated device to keep a windshield clear and had a local company produce a working model. Her device consisted of a lever inside the vehicle that controlled a rubber blade on the outside of the windshield. The lever could be operated to cause the spring-loaded arm to move back and forth across the windshield. A counterweight was used to ensure contact between the wiper and the window. The device could be easily removed if desired after the winter was over. For her “window cleaning device for electric cars and other vehicles to remove snow, ice, or sleet from the window,” Anderson was awarded U.S. Patent No. 743,801. Similar devices had been made earlier, but Anderson's was the first windshield clearing device to be effective. Anderson’s simple mechanism and basic design have remained much the same, but unlike today’s windscreen wipers, Anderson’s could be removed when not needed.

She then applied for, and in 1903 was granted, a 17-year patent for a windshield wiper. The patent application was filed on June 18, 1903. On November 10, 1903, the United States Patent Office awarded Anderson patent number 743,801 for her Window Cleaning device.

In 1903 when Anderson applied for the patent, cars were rich men's toys. Henry Ford’s Model T had not democratized the automobile. Therefore, when Anderson tried to sell the rights to her invention through a noted Canadian firm of Dinning and Eckenstein in 1905, they rejected her application. They argued, "we do not consider it to be of such commercial value as would warrant our undertaking its sale." Furthermore, many could not see the value of her invention and stressed the risk that the driver would be distracted by operating the device and the moving wipers. Many people were initially leery of Anderson’s windshield wiper invention, thinking it would distract drivers, but by 1916, windshield wipers were standard on most vehicles. Her idea was even credited to a man, and many did not know that a woman had created it years before.

By 1913, the automobile manufacturing business had grown exponentially and windshield wipers were standard equipment. In 1922, Cadillac became the first car manufacturer to adopt them as standard equipment. However, Anderson never profited from her invention or was given a recognition. Giving up on partnering with companies to manufacture her invention, the patent expiring in 1920. According to the National Inventors Hall of Fame, her invention was simply ahead of its time, and other companies and entrepreneurs were able to profit off her original ideas.

Sara-Scott Wingo, rector of Emmanuel Episcopal Church in Richmond, Va., and Anderson’s great-great niece, suspects Anderson’s invention never went anywhere because Anderson was an independent woman. Wingo said in an interview with NPR News, “She didn't have a father. She didn't have a husband. And the world was kind of run by men back then.”

In 1917, Charlotte Bridgewood patented the “electric storm windshield cleaner,” the first automatic wiper system that used rollers instead of blades. Like Anderson, Bridgewood never made any money from her invention. Anderson started by prototyping her innovation. There were already many similar designs but hers was the first to actually work. Anderson designed a hand-operated mechanical arm made of metal and rubber. The driver could pull a lever to sweep the blade across the glass, clearing precipitation without stopping the vehicle. Anderson filed for a U.S. patent for her “WINDOW CLEANING DEVICE,” which was granted on November 10, 1903. Her patent described a spring, replaceable wiper blade, and counterweight mechanism to ensure smooth movement. However, she was not successful in selling the device. She filed her patent before Henry Ford even started to manufacture cars. A manufacturing firm in Canada rejected her device because they did not see commercial value. So, her patent expired in 17 years in 1920. In 1922, Cadillac made it standard for all their vehicles.

== Later life ==
By the 1920s, Anderson’s brother-in-law had died, and Anderson was again living in the Fairmont Apartments in Birmingham with her sister Fannie and her mother. She continued to manage the Fairmont Apartments until her death at the age of 87. At the time of her death, she was the oldest member of South Highland Presbyterian Church. She died at her summer home in Monteagle, Tennessee. Her funeral was conducted by Dr. Frank A. Mathes at South Highland and she was buried at Elmwood Cemetery.

== Legacy ==
In 2011 Anderson was inducted into the National Inventors Hall of Fame. With minimal mention or recognition until 2011, thankfully Anderson’s sketch provides a glimpse of her entrepreneurial spirit and ambition. Rini Paiva, executive vice president at the National Inventors Hall of Fame said, "She was persistent, she was forward-thinking, and she had the drive to follow up on an idea."
