= Monteagle Sunday School Assembly =

- Monteagle Sunday School Assembly Historic District
- U.S. National Register of Historic Places
- U.S. Historic district
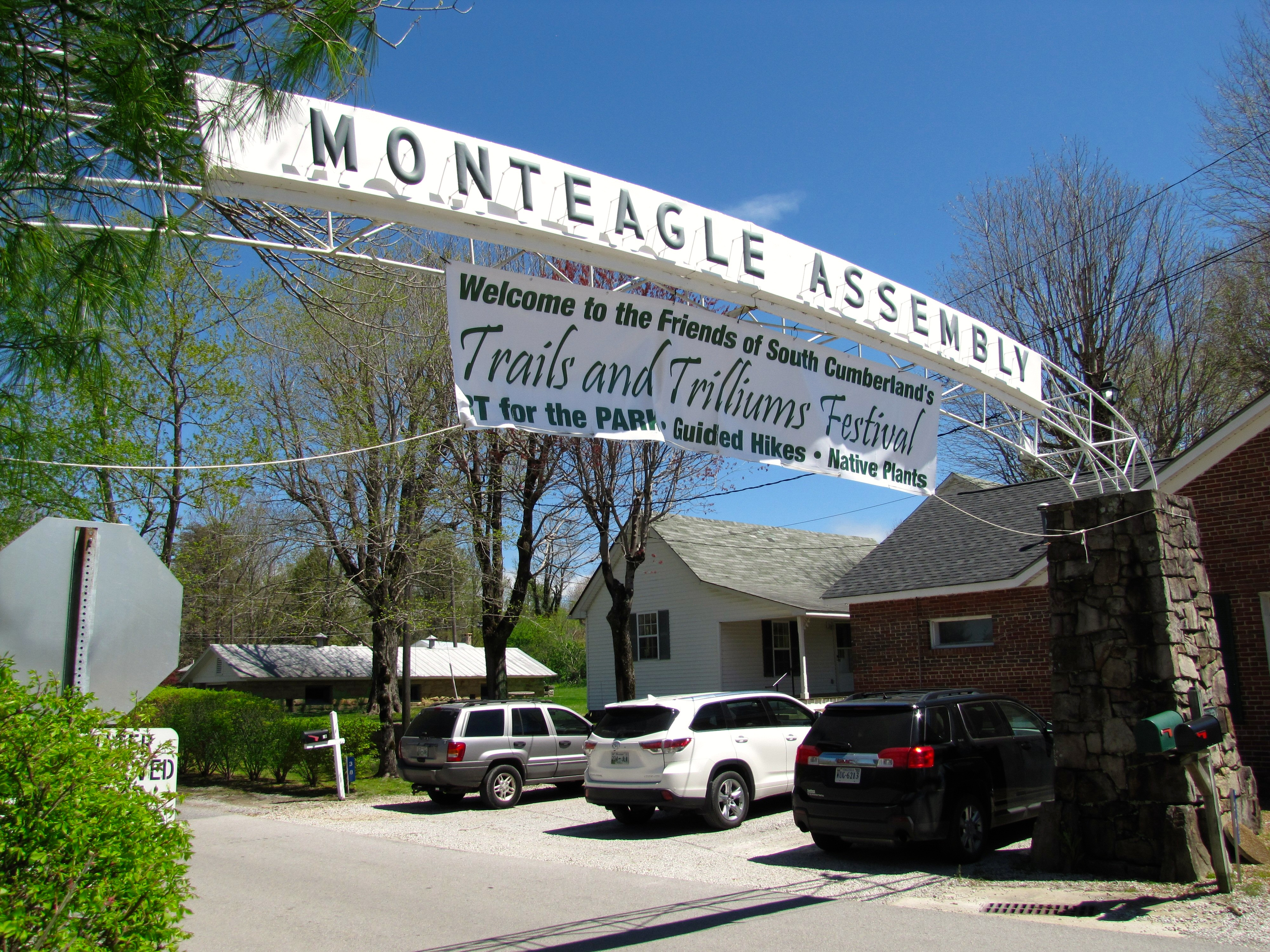
- The entrance to the Monteagle Assembly

- Location within Tennessee Location within the United States
- Location: Off U.S. 64, U.S. 41, and TN 56, Monteagle, Tennessee
- Coordinates: 35.242°N 85.837°W
- Area: 100 acres (40 ha)
- Built: 1882
- Architect: Webster, William; Butler, F.A.
- Architectural style: Late Victorian
- MPS: Grundy County MRA
- NRHP reference No.: 82003974
- Added to NRHP: March 25, 1982

The Monteagle Sunday School Assembly (MSSA) is an interdenominational religious organization based in Monteagle, Tennessee. It was chartered by the state of Tennessee on October 31, 1882.

The MSSA was one of hundreds of similar Assemblies patterned after the Chautauqua Institution in New York in the late 19th century, of which only nine or ten remain active. In 1982, the grounds were placed on the National Register of Historic Places as a historic district.

== History ==
The MSSA was founded in 1882 by the Sunday School Convention of Tennessee, which sought to establish a "Sunday School Congress" in Tennessee. At the time, a number of states had these congresses, often called Assemblies, all of them modelled after the Chautauqua Institution in New York, which is regarded as the first of these Assemblies. They were meant not only as a place for religious activities, such as retreats, but also as places for higher learning at a time when there were few colleges and institutes available to people. The goal of the Assembly was to "combine Sunday School training with a broader program of educational and cultural pursuits".

The MSSA opened for its first summer session on July 17, 1883. Although the Assembly began small with only an amphitheater and dining hall, the summer courses offered on the grounds attracted many students and teachers, as most southern schools didn't offer summer programs. The thousands of yearly visitors soon encouraged the Assembly to begin building projects which led to the creation of many cottages, public meeting halls and boarding rooms. In the 20th century, the MSSA, as well as a number of the other Assemblies modeled after Chautauqua, formed the International Chautauqua Alliance. This coalition brought the Assembly even greater popularity, and allowed it to begin showing guest ministers, lectures and entertainers from around the country during the summer season.

The World Wars and Great Depression severely hindered the revenues and popularity of the MSSA, forcing it to close many cottages and discontinue nearly half their programs; many other Assemblies were forced to shut down during this period. It was nearly 30 years before interest returned to the MSSA, leading to the restoration and refurbishing of many cottages, as well as the introduction of new programs and guest speakers. This reawakening of interest peaked in the 1980s, when the MSSA held its Centennial Celebration and was added to the National Register of Historic Places. The MSSA is one of only 9 surviving Assemblies in the United States, and still receives thousands of visitors a year.

== Grounds ==
The Assembly grounds, which comprise the Monteagle Sunday School Assembly Historic District, constitute a large part of the area of the town of Monteagle. A stone gatehouse marks the entry to the grounds, which are served by narrow, winding roads. Most of the 162 buildings on the grounds are residences for Assembly participants, typically one- and two-story frame cottages with porches, featuring Queen Anne and Carpenter Gothic design elements. A chapel, library, dining hall, and several recreational structures are also present. About 40 percent of the grounds are maintained as parkland.
