= Madelon Battle Hancock =

American socialite and nurse (1881–1930)

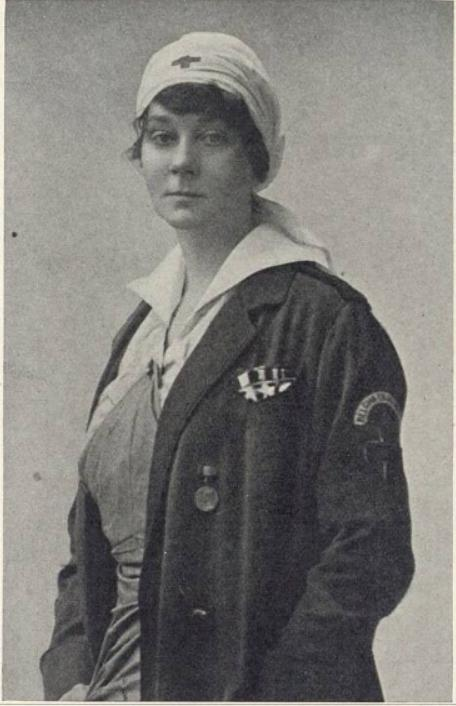
- Hancock in her nurse's uniform c. 1915
- Born: Madelon Belknap Battle; August 30, 1881; Pensacola, Florida, USA
- Died: September 29, 1930 (aged 49); Nice, France
- Other names: Madelon de Hellencourt; "Glory Hancock"
- Education: Saint Mary's School; Presbyterian Hospital School of Nursing
- Occupation: Nurse
- Spouse: Mortimer Hancock (m. 1904; div. 1923)
- Children: 1

Madelon Battle Hancock, Comtesse de Hellencourt (born Madelon Belknap Battle; August 30, 1881 – September 29, 1930) was an American socialite and nurse. She worked in hospitals in Belgium throughout the First World War, receiving the nicknames "Glory Hancock" and "Most Decorated Woman of World War One". She was the recipient of various British, French, and Belgian honors for her service during the war, including the Order of the Crown, the Croix de guerre, and the British War Medal. She was ennobled by Albert I of Belgium.

== Early life ==
Battle was born in 1881 the daughter of in Dr S Westray Battle and Alice Maud Battle née Belknap. Battle was born in Pensacola, Florida, where her father was in charge of the US Naval Hospital, but the family moved to Asheville, North Carolina, in 1884 after Dr Battle left the navy.

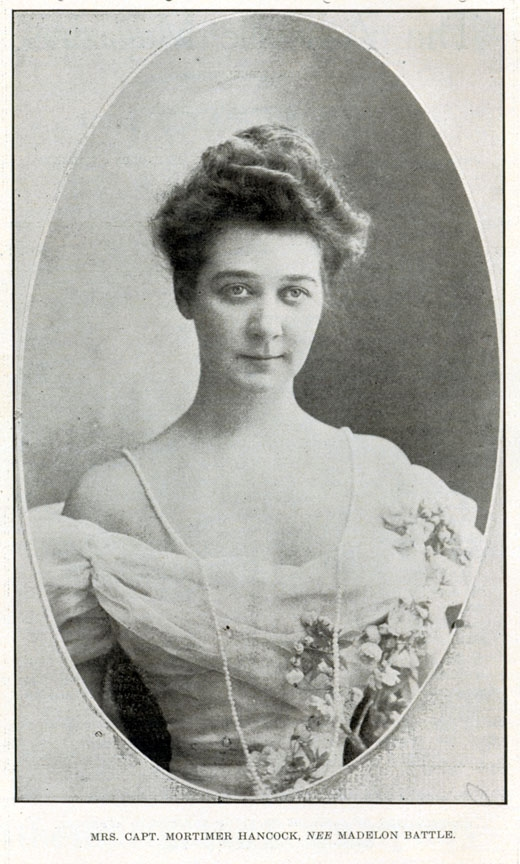
Madelon at the time of her wedding to Mortimer Hancock

Battle went to Saint Mary's School in Raleigh. After graduating high school in 1889, Battle became something of a socialite and North Carolina newspapers often commentated on her activities. In 1902 she enrolled at Presbyterian Hospital School of Nursing in New York City but left before completing her training. (Note: Some sources say she completed her training in 1905 but the archives of the School of Nursing show that her diploma was only awarded in 1917 as an honorary award.)

In 1903 many newspapers carried a story that Battle had become engaged to a British landowner, Cecil Graham. The story was emphatically denied by Battle's family as "absolutely false".

In 1904 she married Captain Mortimer Pawson Hancock, a British army officer, at All Souls Church in Biltmore Village. The Atlanta Constitution described the ceremony as "the most distinguished wedding celebrated in North Carolina for a number of years". After her marriage she moved to England and India with her husband. They had one son, Westray Battle Hancock, born 1907.

== World War One ==
At the outbreak of the war the Hancocks were living in England and was determined to volunteer as a nurse in Belgium. She travelled to Antwerp to work with a British hospital unit in the city and remained with the hospital through the siege of the city until the hospital was evacuated in October 1914. After a brief period with American Red Cross Hospital No. 1 (aka American Ambulance) in Neuilly, Hancock returned to serve with a hospital nearer the front lines. For the next four years she worked almost ceaselessly in front-line hospitals and her activities and letters home were often reported in American newspapers, an opportunity Hancock used to ask for relief funds. Her plea was answered and many gifts sent including a consignment of 60,000 packets of cigarettes donated by Asheville Fire Department.

In June 1918 Hancock took a period of leave and returned to the United States for two weeks to visit her family accompanied by her pet monkey, Belladonna. After her leave Hancock returned to the Western Front and continued nursing until the end of the war. Very early in the war she was given the nickname "Glory Hancock" by the British troops and the name appeared in the press as early as October 1914.

=== Decorations ===
Hancock was decorated by Belgium, France and Great Britain. The decorations included:

- Order of the Crown (Belgium)
- Civic Decoration (Belgium)
- Croix de guerre (Belgium)
- Queen Elisabeth Medal (Belgium)
- Yser Medal (Belgium)
- Commemorative Medal of the 1914–1918 War (Belgium)
- Croix de guerre (France)
- 1914 Star (Great Britain)
- War Medal (Great Britain)
- Inter-Allied Victory Medal (Great Britain)

== Later life ==
After the war Hancock spent time in Asheville recovering before rejoining her husband. The strains and separation of the war took their toll on the couple and they divorced in 1923. In 1928 Hancock formally changed her name to Madelon Hellencourt and used the title Countess de Hellencourt, a title received with the award of the Belgian Order of the Crown.

Hancock died in Nice, France, on September 29, 1930, after surgery.
