= Charlotte Bridgwood =

Canadian vaudeville performer and inventor

- Born: Charlotte Dunn; 18 August 1861; Hamilton, Canada West
- Died: 20 August 1929 (aged 68); Hollywood, Los Angeles County, US
- Known for: Inventor
- Children: Florence Lawrence

Charlotte Bridgwood (née Dunn, 18 August 1861 – 20 August 1929) was a Canadian vaudeville performer and inventor. She was the mother to Florence Lawrence, regarded as the "first movie star" and an inventor in her own right. Both mother and daughter developed automotive safety devices in the early years of the automobile.

== Career ==
=== Theatre ===
Charlotte Bridgwood, known by the stage name "Lotta Lawrence", was the lead actress for the Lawrence Dramatic Company, which she also managed. She went on to act in many movies with her daughter, including Daniel Boone/Pioneer Days in America and The Shaughraun. While her daughter continued acting in film, Charlotte returned to stage productions.

=== Automotive advancements ===
Charlotte Bridgwood was president of the Bridgwood Manufacturing Company. She was an automobile enthusiast. She decided to improve Mary Anderson's manual windshield wipers, in which people had to use levers to operate the windshield wipers. Through her manufacturing company, she invented automatic windshield wipers that she called "Electric Storm Windshield Cleaner". She patented the first electrically powered windshield wiper in 1917, improving previous manually operated wipers such as the one patented by Mary Anderson in 1905. However, her wiper used rollers rather than blades and did not catch on.

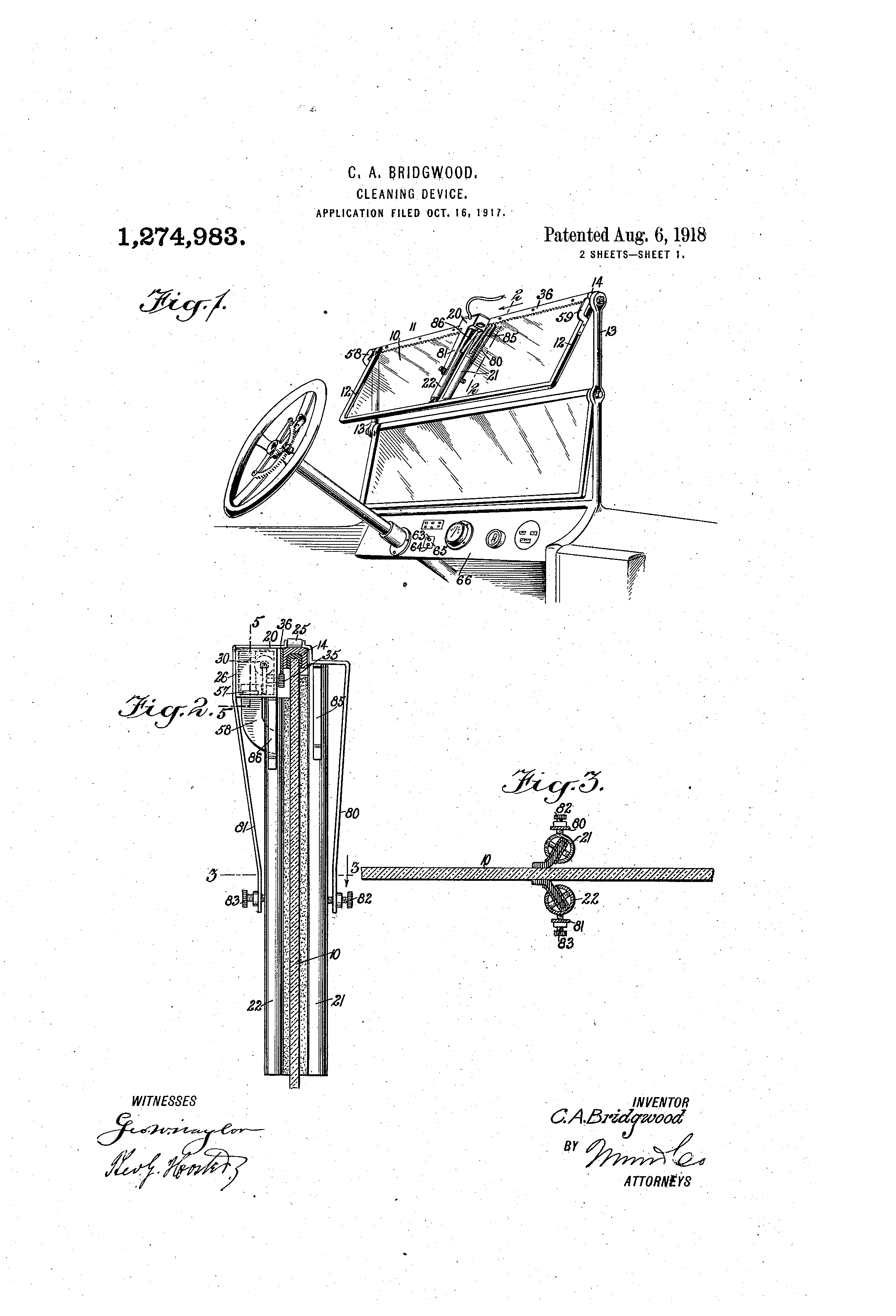
Original patent design for Charlotte Bridgwood's "Electric Storm Windshield Cleaner"

=== Patents ===
In October 1917, Charlotte received a patent for the first automatic windshield cleaner. The patent protected the mechanism of rollers powered by the car's engine or a separate motor to clean the windshield. However, she never brought her design into full production, so the patent expired in 1920. Since US patent law no longer protected her product’s propriety, it was only a matter of time until large car manufacturers picked up her design. Cadillac was the first company to adopt the design two years later. Charlotte Bridgwood’s invention was left without much recognition.
