= Margaret Mordecai Jones Cruikshank =

American teacher and college president (1878–1955)

7th President of St. Mary's Junior College
- In office 1932–1955
- Preceded by: Warren Wade Way
- Succeeded by: Richard Gabriel Stone

President of the Columbia Institute
- In office 1922–1932
- Preceded by: Ernest Cruikshank

Personal details
- Born: October 13, 1878 Hillsborough, North Carolina, U.S.
- Died: December 26, 1955 (aged 77)
- Spouse: Ernest Cruikshank
- Children: 3
- Education: Saint Mary's School; University of North Carolina at Chapel Hill; Columbia University; Duke University

Margaret Mordecai Cruikshank (née Jones; October 13, 1878 – December 26, 1955) was an American schoolteacher and college president. She served as the president of the Columbia Institute in Tennessee from 1922 to 1932 and as the president of St. Mary's Junior College in North Carolina from 1932 until her death in 1955. She was the first woman to serve as head of St. Mary's and is the only alumna to have served as president. Cruikshank had degrees from the University of North Carolina at Chapel Hill, Columbia University, and Duke University.

== Biography ==
Cruikshank was born Margaret Mordecai Jones on October 13, 1878, in Hillsborough, North Carolina to Halcott Pride Jones and Olive Echols Jones. She attended the Nash-Kollock School for Young Ladies, a boarding school in Hillsorough, before transferring to St. Mary's School, an Episcopal boarding school in Raleigh, from which she graduated in 1896. She and her twin sister, Mary Pride Jones, had moved to St. Mary's after the deaths of their parents.

Upon graduating, she worked as a schoolteacher at St. Mary's, teaching mathematics, astronomy, German, and Bible classes. After three years of teaching, she enrolled at the University of North Carolina in 1901. She returned to St. Mary's to teach for another three years before enrolling as a student at the Teachers College at Columbia University in New York City. During her summer breaks, she travelled to Europe. She graduated from Columbia in 1911 and on June 17 of that year, she married Ernest Cruikshank, who was the business manager of St. Mary's. They had three children: Ernest, Mary Pride, and Olive.

Cruikshank returned to St. Mary's, where she taught until 1921 when her husband became the president of the Columbia Institute in Tennessee. Her husband died in 1922 and she succeeded him as president, serving in that capacity until 1932, when she was elected as principal and academic head, and later as president, of St. Mary's Junior College, her alma mater. She was the first woman to serve as head of St. Mary's. While serving as president, she helped establish the school's Student Government Association and approved their constitution in 1938.

In 1937 she earned a master's degree from Duke University. She was an Episcopalian and a Democrat.

Cruikshank died of a heart attack on December 26, 1955. A dormitory built in 1966 at St. Mary's is named in her honor. A scholarship named in her honor was established at St. Mary's in 1958.
