= St. Mary's Chapel (Raleigh, North Carolina) =

- U.S. National Register of Historic Places
- U.S. Historic district – Contributing property
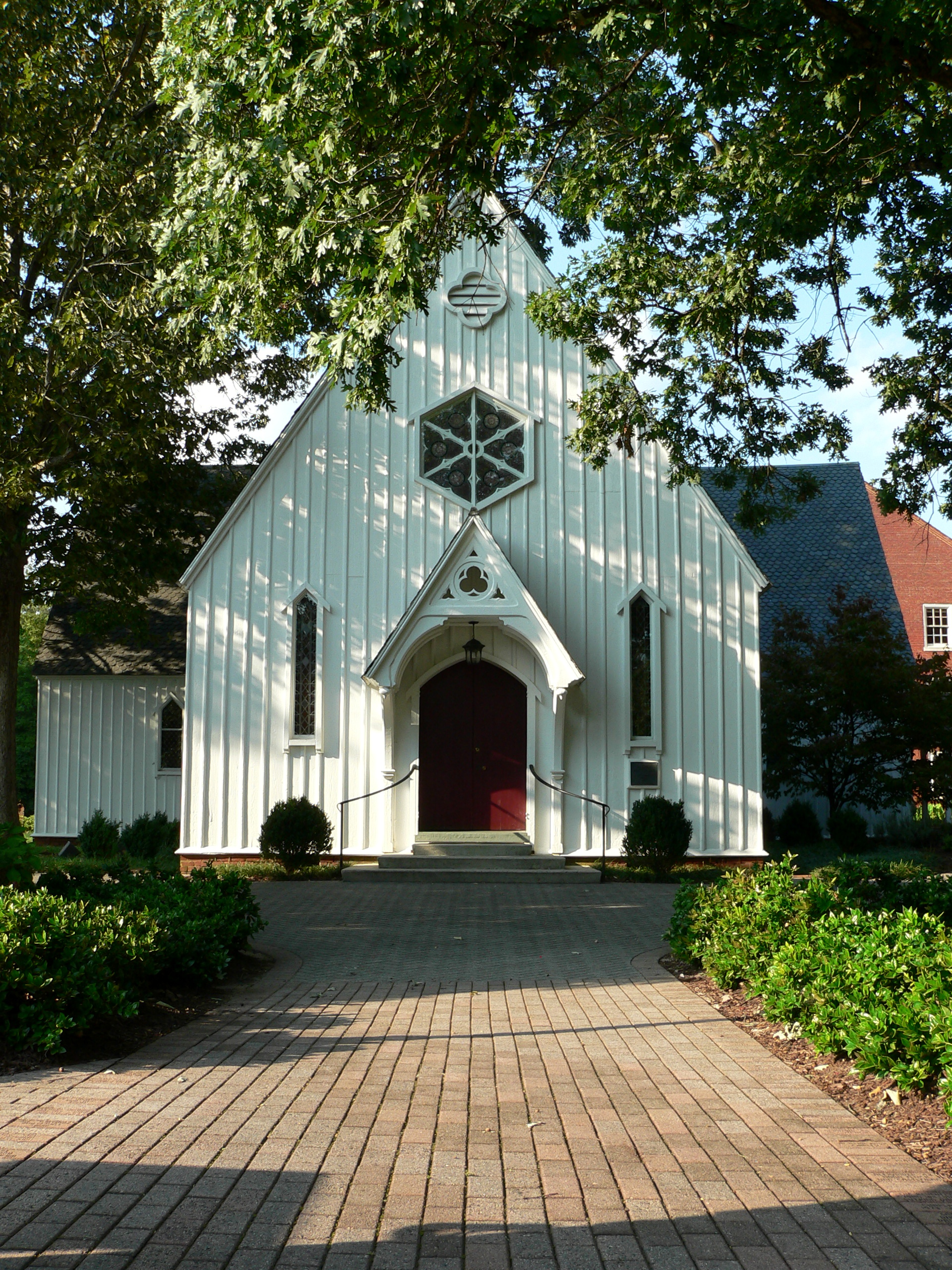
- St. Mary's Chapel, 2014

- Location within North Carolina
- Location: 900 Hillsborough Street; Raleigh, North Carolina, U.S.
- Coordinates: 35°46′54″N 78°39′11″W
- Built: 1855; 171 years ago
- Architect: Richard Upjohn
- Architectural style: Gothic Revival
- Part of: St. Mary's College
- NRHP reference No.: 70000477
- Added to NRHP: November 20, 1970

St. Mary's Chapel is a historic Episcopal chapel located at 900 Hillsborough Street in Raleigh, North Carolina, United States. The chapel is on the grounds of St. Mary's School, a college-preparatory boarding and day school founded in 1842. The 19th-century building was designed by architect Richard Upjohn in the Gothic Revival style and later expanded. It was added to the National Register of Historic Places (NRHP) in 1970.

== History ==
The Episcopal School for Boys, established in 1833 by the Episcopal Diocese of North Carolina, was located on a 159-acre (64 ha) tract of land acquired from Colonel William Polk. Construction of the school buildings began in 1834, but by 1837, the school was closed due to financial problems. The property was purchased by businessman and politician Duncan Cameron, a wealthy and influential figure in Raleigh. The school was reopened on May 12, 1842, as St. Mary's School for Girls, by Cameron and Reverend Aldert Smedes, the school's first rector and president. Religious services at St. Mary's were originally held in the parlor of Main Hall, now known as Smedes Hall. Services were later held on the first floor of historic East Rock building equipped with pews and an organ.

In 1855, the Cameron family donated funds for the construction of a school chapel. Richard Upjohn, a prominent 19th century architect, was chosen to design the building. His notable works include Trinity Church in New York City and Christ Episcopal Church in Raleigh, both of which are National Historic Landmarks. Thomas Atkinson, the third Episcopal Bishop of North Carolina, visited the chapel for the first time in 1858 and said "I was gratified by its beauty, its appropriate arrangements, and its adaptation to its purpose." Transepts were added in 1905, though most of the chapel was left unchanged. The building was designated a Raleigh Historic Landmark on June 16, 1969, and added to the NRHP on November 20, 1970. The building is also designated a contributing property to Saint Mary's School's listing as a historic district on the NRHP.

== Architecture ==
St. Mary's Chapel, a board-and-batten building with steep gable roof, was designed in the Gothic Revival style. When erected in 1856, the chapel was a rectangular building. The transepts added in 1905 gave the building a cruciform shape. The chapel facade features a lancet window on either side of the entrance. A hood above the entrance is supported by curved brackets while the hood gable features a trefoil design. Above the hood is a rose window topped by a louvered quatrefoil and cruciform finial at the roof. There are four triangular-headed lancet windows on the east and west (liturgical south and north) sides of the nave. The end of the east (liturgical south) transept is similar to the facade. Instead of a hood, this transept features a shed porch that connects to the Smedes building via a covered walkway. A large lancet window and two smaller ones are on the end of the west (liturgical north) transept. The north (liturgical east) side of the chapel features a large stained glass lancet window topped by a louvered quatrefoil.

== See also ==
- National Register of Historic Places listings in Wake County, North Carolina
