= Saint Mary's School (Raleigh, North Carolina) =

Historic school in North Carolina, United States

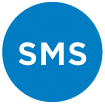

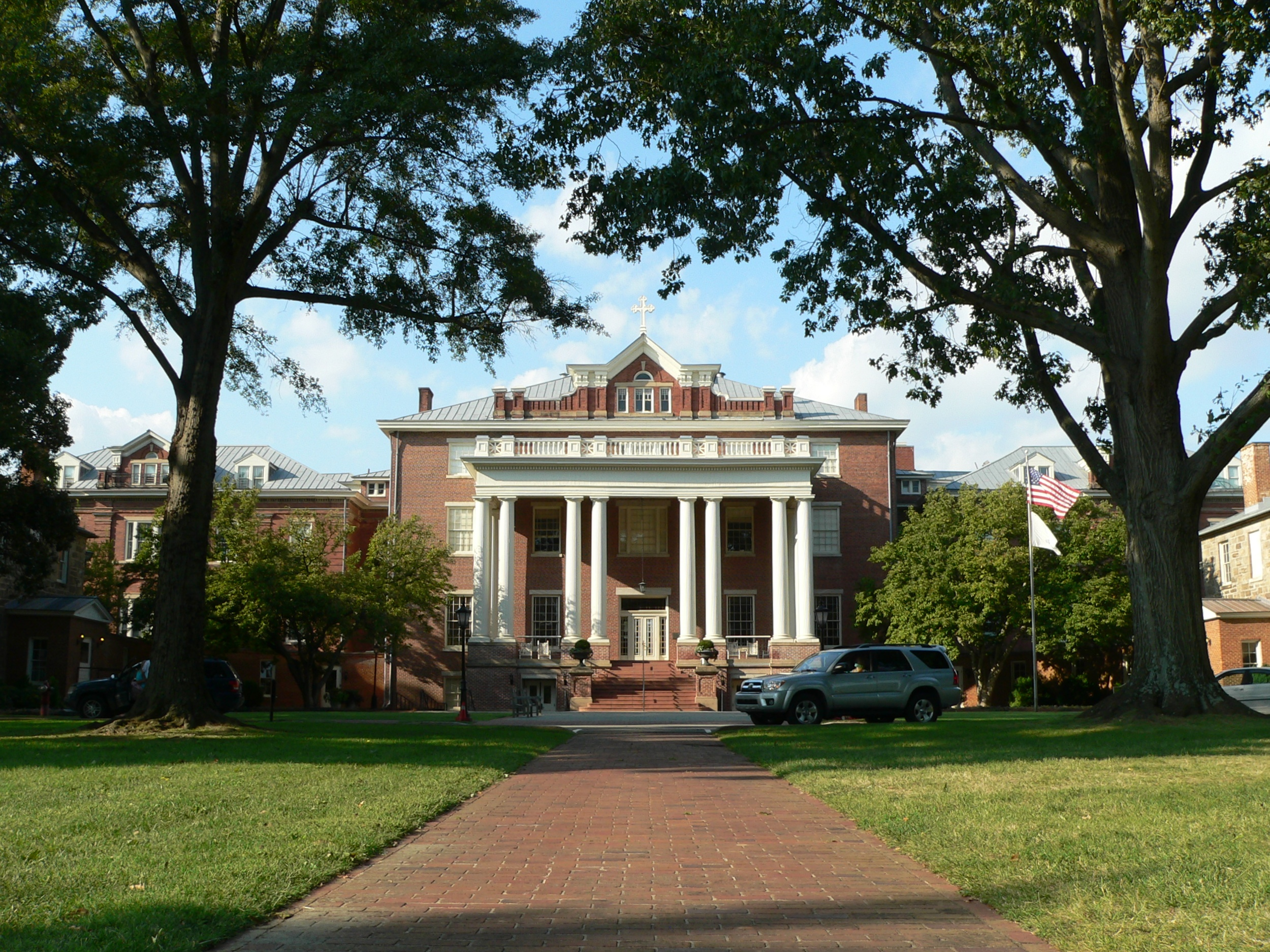
- Smedes Hall at Saint Mary's School

Location
- 900 Hillsborough Street; Raleigh, North Carolina 27603; United States; 35°46′58″N 78°39′10″W

Information
- Type: Private, Day & Boarding, College-prep
- Religious affiliation: Episcopal
- Founded: 1842 (184 years ago)
- Faculty: 40
- Grades: 9–12
- Gender: Girls
- Enrollment: 308
- Campus size: 22 acres (89,000 m^{2})
- Campus type: Urban
- Colors: Light blue and white
- Athletics: North Carolina Independent Schools Athletic Association (NCISAA)
- Athletics conference: Triangle Independent Schools Athletic Conference (TISAC)
- Team name: Saints
- Accreditation: SACS, SAIS
- Tuition: $56,875 (boarding students) $28,515 (day students)
- Website: www.sms.edu

- St. Mary's College
- U.S. National Register of Historic Places
- U.S. Historic district
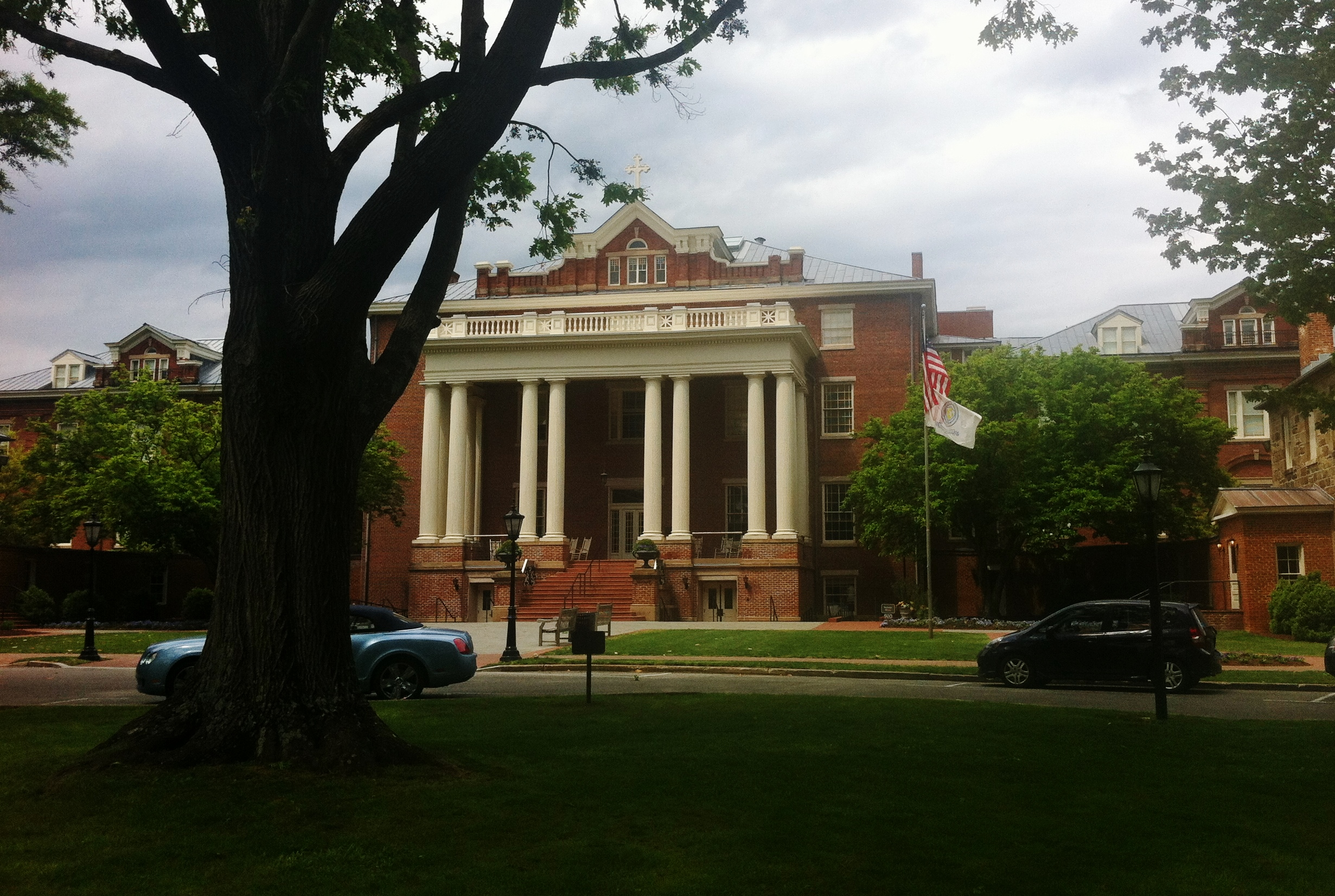
- Front entrance and main building of Saint Mary's

- Location within North Carolina Location within the United States
- Location: St. Marys and Hillsborough Sts., Raleigh, North Carolina
- Area: 22 acres (8.9 ha)
- Architect: Multiple
- Architectural style: Classical Revival, Late Gothic Revival
- NRHP reference No.: 78001981
- Added to NRHP: December 19, 1978

Saint Mary's School is a private independent Episcopal college-preparatory, boarding and day school for girls in grades 9–12. Located in Raleigh, North Carolina, Saint Mary's School operates as an independent school with a historic affiliation with the Episcopal Church including an Episcopal chapel, St. Mary's Chapel, on the school's grounds. The school formerly operated as Saint Mary's College and for many decades educated young women in grades 11–12 and their freshman and sophomore years in college. The school changed to a four year high school in 1998, at which point the name reverted to Saint Mary's School, the original name of the institution when it was founded in 1842.

== School information ==
The school has 40 faculty members, with 80% holding advanced degrees. Enrollment is currently 315 full-time students, representing 14 states and 14 countries. The average class size is 13 students. Saint Mary's has a 8:1 student to faculty ratio. Additionally, 36 faculty and staff members reside on the campus.

Among the superlatives assigned to the school include the oldest continuously operated school in Raleigh, North Carolina, the third oldest girls' school in the state, and the fifth oldest girls' boarding/day school in the United States. Saint Mary's celebrated its 175th anniversary, May 12, 2017, and will celebrate its 200th year in 2042.

== History ==
Founded in 1842 by the Rev. Aldert Smedes, an Episcopal priest, Saint Mary's School has operated continuously on the same site ever since.

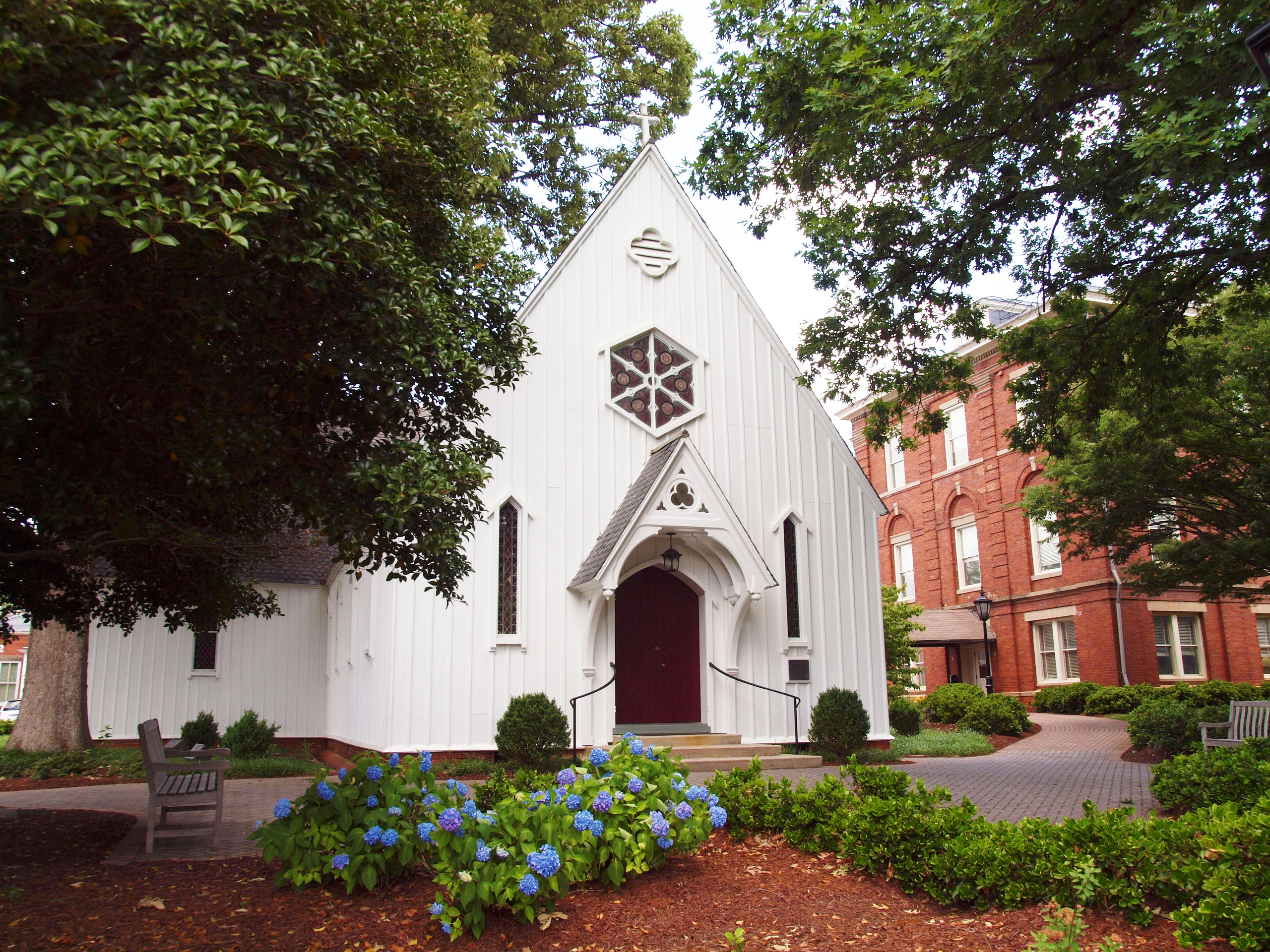
Saint Mary's Chapel, built in 1856, is a National Historic Site

With the support of the Episcopal Diocese of North Carolina, Smedes founded Saint Mary's as a school for young ladies "designed to furnish a thorough and excellent education equal to the best that can be obtained in the city of New York, or in any Northern school." The school was founded on the site of the Episcopal School of North Carolina, a short-lived school for boys in the 1830s. Three of the present school buildings—East Rock, West Rock and Smedes Hall—formed the original campus. East Rock and West Rock, the first two buildings, were constructed with remnant stones from the construction of the North Carolina State Capitol.

During the Civil War, Saint Mary's became a safe haven for relatives of both Union and Confederate officers, including General Robert E. Lee's daughter, Mildred Childe Lee. Smedes kept the school operating throughout the war. In 1865, General William Tecumseh Sherman's Union troops camped in The Grove on front campus, and Sherman visited Smedes in the main building. From 1906 to 1908 President Woodrow Wilson's daughter Eleanor Wilson attended Saint Mary's.

In 1900, Alpha Kappa Psi sorority was founded at Saint Mary's.

In 1932, an alumna of the school, Margaret Mordecai Jones Cruikshank, was appointed as the seventh president of the school, making her the first woman president at Saint Mary's.

The school was racially integrated in the 1970s, when the first African student was admitted. That first African student, a college student from Addis Ababa, Ethiopia, graduated in 1973, and the first African-American student graduated in 1981. International students from China were enrolled as early as 1928, from Japan and the West Indies in the 1930s, and from nations including Japan and Denmark in the 1950s. In 2025, students from 14 nations were enrolled.

The historic core of the school's 23-acre campus is listed on the National Register of Historic Places and is a stop on the North Carolina Civil War Trails. The Saint Mary's Chapel, designed by Richard Upjohn, is a National Historic Site, and five of the school's 25 buildings are Raleigh Historic Properties.

== Campus ==
Saint Mary's buildings date from the nineteenth and twentieth centuries and also include antebellum structures individually recognized as Local Historic Landmarks. Three buildings from the 1830s are visible from Hillsborough Street from behind a wooded glade of large oaks, hollies, and magnolias.

The school's oldest structures, East and West Rock, are matching buildings constructed with discarded stone from the building of the second North Carolina State Capitol in the 1830s. The brick Greek Revival building between them was erected soon after; it was remodeled in 1909 to include a Neoclassical Revival front portico and dormitory wings. This main building was named Smedes Hall for the school's founder, the Rev. Aldert Smedes.

Two buildings erected in the later nineteenth century are Gothic in style: the 1856 Richard Upjohn Gothic Chapel and the 1887 Gothic Revival arts building, a brick structure with pointed-arch windows.

The early twentieth century saw much construction; nearly all the permanent brick buildings, which were rendered in the Colonial Revival style, survive. Later construction continued to complement earlier buildings, and the view of the campus from Hillsborough Street remains notable for its historic integrity.

Saint Mary's School was listed on the National Register of Historic Places in 1978 as a national historic district. The district encompasses nine contributing buildings, including St. Mary's Chapel. Currently, the campus is considered to be part of downtown Raleigh.

== Athletics ==
Saint Mary's School offers a full interscholastic athletic program consisting of 18 sports teams. Saint Mary's School competes as a member of the Triangle Independent Schools Athletic Conference (TISAC) and the North Carolina Independent Schools Athletic Association (NCISAA, 3A Classification). Sports offered at Saint Mary's include soccer, cross country, field hockey, golf, tennis, volleyball, basketball, lacrosse, swimming, track and field, softball, flag football, and cheerleading.

== Notable people ==
=== Alumni ===
- Fanny Yarborough Bickett (1870–1941), First Lady of North Carolina and first female president of the North Carolina Railroad
- Katherine Devereux Blake (1858–1950), educator, women's rights activist, peace activist, and writer
- Charlsie Cantey (born c. 1946), thoroughbred horse racing analyst and sportscaster
- Marie Watters Colton (1922–2018), first female Speaker Pro Tempore of the North Carolina House of Representatives
- Elizabeth Brownrigg Henderson Cotten (1875–1975), librarian, socialite, and suffragist
- Margaret Mordecai Jones Cruikshank (1878–1955), first female president of Saint Mary's School & Junior College
- Sally Cruikshank (born 1949), animator
- Matilda Bradford Haughton Ehringhaus (1890–1980), First Lady of North Carolina
- Madelon Battle Hancock, Comtesse de Hellencourt (1881–1930), socialite and volunteer nurse during World War I
- Laura Montgomery Henderson (1867–1940), First Lady of Alabama and president of the Alabama Federation of Women’s Clubs
- Mary Ferrand Henderson, suffragist and Democratic party leader
- Mary Dana Hinton, first African-American president of Hollins University
- Mary Hilliard Hinton (1869–1961), historian, painter, anti-suffragist, and white supremacist
- Laurel Holloman, actress and visual artist
- Barbara Howar, journalist, author, socialite
- Betty Debnam Hunt, founder of The Mini Page
- Jeanne Jolly, singer and songwriter
- Sarah Graham Kenan (1876–1968), heiress and philanthropist
- Sara Beaumont Cannon Kennedy (1859–1920), writer and newspaper editor
- Helen Whitaker Fowle Knight (1869–1948), First Lady of North Carolina as daughter of Governor Daniel Gould Fowle
- Elizabeth Lawrence, horticulture writer and landscape architect
- Mildred Childe Lee (1846–1905), society hostess and daughter of Confederate General Robert E. Lee
- Nell Battle Lewis (1893–1956), journalist, lawyer, and women's rights activist
- Eleanor Randolph Wilson McAdoo (1889–1967), author and daughter of U.S. President Woodrow Wilson
- Betty Ray McCain (born 1931), North Carolina Secretary of Cultural Resources and first female Chair of the North Carolina Democratic Party
- Lucile Aycock McKee (1919–2013), president of the Junior League of Raleigh
- Emilie Watts McVea (1867–1928), academic administrator and president of Sweet Briar College
- Marguerite McKee Moss, socialite
- Eliza Hall Nutt Parsley (1842–1920), founder and president of the NC Division of the United Daughters of the Confederacy
- Bevin Prince (b. 1982), actress
- Sally Dalton Robinson (b. 1934), philanthropist and civic leader
- Sarah Amanda Sanders Russell (1844–1913), First Lady of North Carolina
- Florence Wells Slater (1864–1941), entomologist and science teacher
- Panthea Twitty (1912–1977), photographer, ceramist, and historian

=== Faculty ===
- Margaret Mordecai Jones Cruikshank (1878–1955), first female president of Saint Mary's School & Junior College (also an alumna)
- Peggy Kirk Bell, physical education and golf teacher
- Wiffi Smith, physical education and golf instructor and coach
- Lisa Grabarek, humanities teacher
- Florence Wells Slater (1864–1941), science teacher (also an alumna)

== See also ==
- St. Mary's Chapel (Raleigh, North Carolina)
- List of Registered Historic Places in North Carolina
