= Fairmount College =

American girls' school in Monteagle, Tennessee, US

- Former names: Fairmount Female College and Fairmount School for Girls
- Type: Private college
- Active: 1872; 154 years ago – 1918; 108 years ago
- Location: Fairmont and College Streets, Monteagle, Tennessee, United States; 35°14′29″N 85°49′38″W

Fairmount College (1872 – 1917/18), also known as Fairmount Female College and Fairmount School for Girls, was an American private college for female students. It was located at Fairmont (Note: This street spelling appears correct from current maps, even though it differs slightly from the name of the college.) and College Streets in Monteagle, Tennessee.

== History ==
The institution was established in 1872 with the aid of John Moffatt, a Scottish-born temperance preacher and landowner. It was Moffat and business partner Oliver Maybee who convinced Fairmount's first headmistresses, Louise Yerger and Harriet B. Kells, to move their girls' school from Jackson, Mississippi to Tennessee.

Silas McBee, who later gained fame as an author and architect, became the principal of Fairmount College in the late 1800s. McBee turned the school into a church institution that might be "for girls what Sewanee was for young men".

The school ceased operations in 1917/18. In 1921, Reverend William Stirling Claiborne and Dr. Mercer P. Logan founded the DuBose Memorial Church Training School (later, DuBose Conference Center) on the school's former site.

Fairmount College's papers are held in the University Archives and Special Collections of Sewanee: The University of the South.

== Student activities ==
The school hosted an early chapter of Delta Gamma, a general sorority, and a chapter of Alpha Kappa Psi, a now-dormant general sorority. (Note: Not to be confused with the business fraternity of the same name.)

== Notable alumni ==
Among its students, in 1910, the school hosted two of the Soong sisters, one of whom later became Madame Chiang Kai-shek and the other, Soong Ching-ling, who married Sun Yat-sen.
