= Monteagle, Tennessee =

- Town
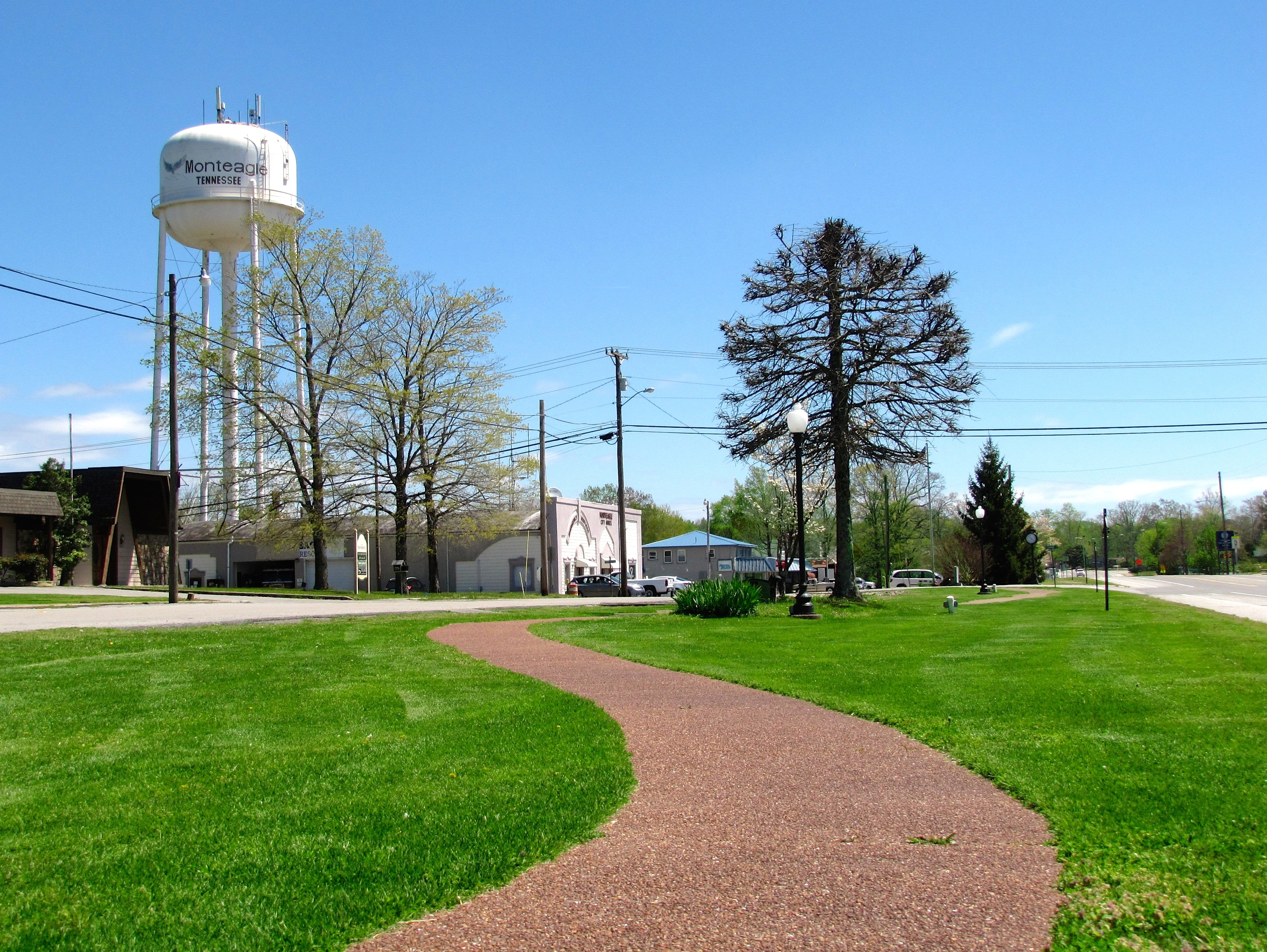
- Greenway and water tower in Monteagle

- Location of Monteagle in Franklin, Grundy, and Marion counties Tennessee.
- Coordinates: 35°14′24″N 85°50′4″W
- Country: United States
- State: Tennessee
- Counties: Grundy, Marion, Franklin
- Founded: 1870
- Incorporated: 1962
- Named for: Eagles that once lived in the area

Area
  - Total: 9.15 sq mi (23.71 km^{2})
  - Land: 9.04 sq mi (23.42 km^{2})
  - Water: 0.11 sq mi (0.29 km^{2})
- Elevation: 1,926 ft (587 m)

Population (2020)
  - Total: 1,393
  - Density: 154.0/sq mi (59.47/km^{2})
- Time zone: UTC-6 (Central (CST))
  - Summer (DST): UTC-5 (CDT)
- ZIP code: 37356
- Area codes: 931, 423
- FIPS code: 47-49740
- GNIS feature ID: 1314141
- Website: www.townofmonteagle-tn.gov

Monteagle is a town in Franklin, Grundy, and Marion counties in the U.S. state of Tennessee, in the Cumberland Plateau region of the southeastern part of the state. The population was 1,238 at the 2000 census – 804 of the town's 1,238 residents (64.9%) lived in Grundy County, 428 (34.6%) in Marion County, and 6 (0.5%) in Franklin County. The population at the 2020 census was 1,393.

The Marion County portion of Monteagle is part of the Chattanooga–GA Metropolitan Statistical Area, while the Franklin County portion is part of the Tullahoma, TN Micropolitan Statistical Area.

Monteagle is famous for the treacherous stretch of Interstate 24 that passes through the town. It is here that the highway passes over what is colloquially referred to as "The Monteagle" or "Monteagle Mountain", a section of the southern Cumberland Plateau which is a major landmark on the road between Chattanooga and Nashville. The interstate regularly shuts down in inclement weather, routing traffic onto U.S. Route 41. In the Jerry Reed song "The Legend", which is the opening track in the film Smokey and the Bandit, Reed tells the story of the Bandit miraculously surviving brake failure on the "Monteagle Grade". There is also a song called "Monteagle Mountain" by Johnny Cash on the album Boom Chicka Boom.

The town is home to DuBose Conference Center and the Monteagle Sunday School Assembly. The Highlander Folk School, long involved in the labor movement and the civil rights movement, was located here from 1932 to 1961. Rosa Parks attended workshops there shortly before the Montgomery Bus Boycott.

== History ==
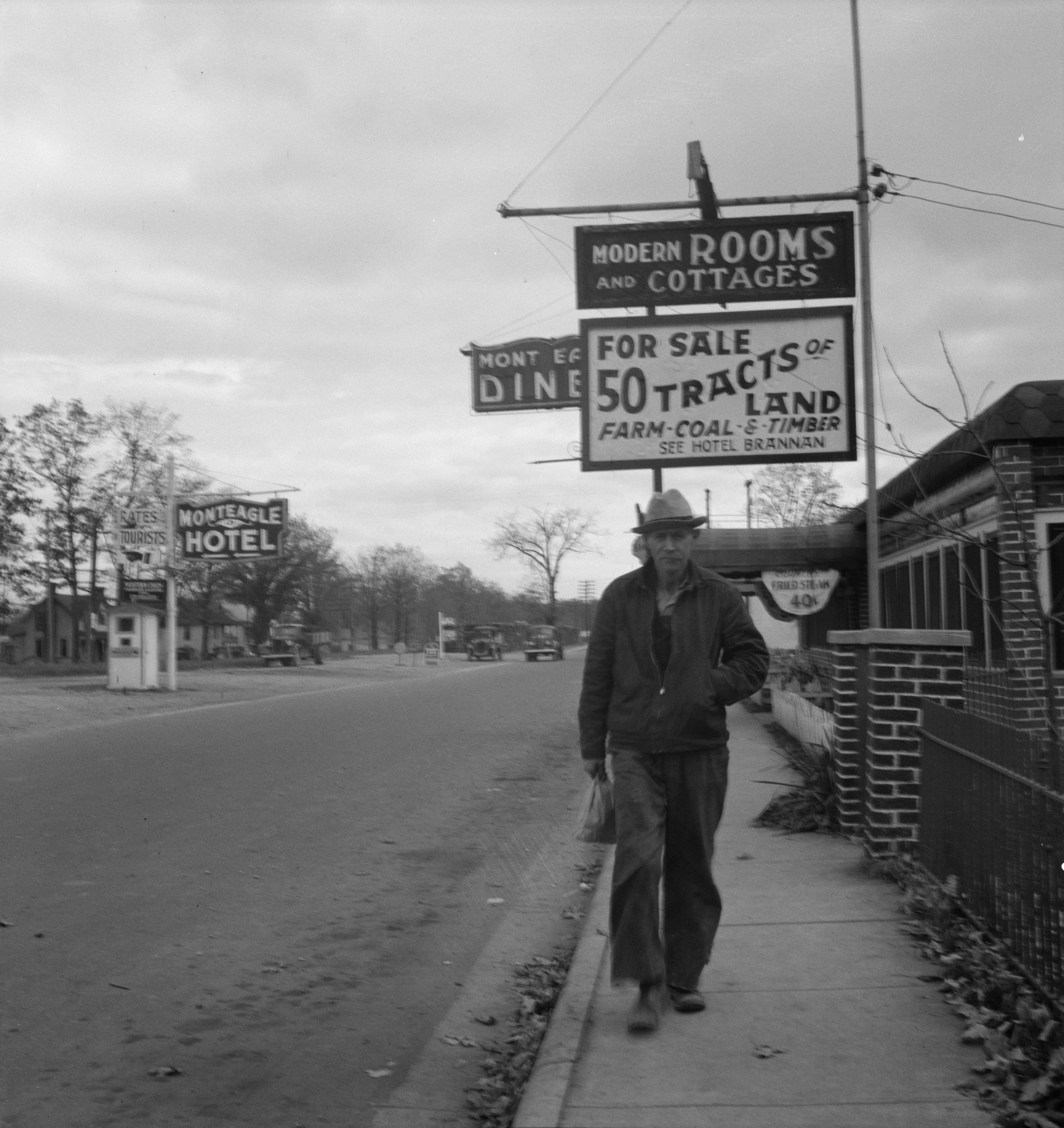
Monteagle highway scene, circa 1941

Monteagle has long served as a popular point to cross the Cumberland Plateau due to its location along a relatively narrow stretch of the plateau in southern Tennessee. One of the last groups of Cherokees removed from the Southeastern United States along the Trail of Tears passed through what is now Monteagle en route to Oklahoma in late October 1838. This group consisted of approximately 700 Cherokee led by John Bell and escorted by U.S. Army Lieutenant Edward Deas.

The town of Monteagle was originally known as "Moffat Station" after John Moffat, a Scottish-Canadian temperance activist who purchased over 1,000 acres (4.0 km^{2}) of land in the area in 1870. In 1872, Moffat donated 50 acres (20 ha) of land to Fairmount College, a women's college that had decided to relocate to the area from Jackson, Mississippi. The grounds of the school are now home to the DuBose Conference Center, named for one of the school's early pastors. In 1882, the Chautauqua-inspired Monteagle Sunday School Assembly was established to train Sunday school teachers.

The name of Moffat Station was later changed to "Mount Eagle", and afterwards to "Mounteagle". The spelling had been changed to "Monteagle" by the time the town incorporated in 1962.

== Geography ==
Monteagle is located in the southwest corner of Grundy County and the northwest corner of Marion County at 35°14′24″N 85°50′4″W (35.239941, -85.834372). The Marion-Grundy county line runs east-to-west through the center of town. The town limits extend west into Franklin County as well.

The town straddles a narrow stretch of the Cumberland Plateau known colloquially as "Monteagle Mountain". This stretch of the plateau is approximately 2 miles (3 km) wide, with steep drop-offs to the northwest and southeast. Monteagle lies at an elevation of just under 2,000 feet (610 m) above sea level. By comparison, two nearby cities, Cowan (to the northwest) and South Pittsburg (to the southeast), lie at elevations of less than 1,000 feet (300 m) above sea level.

Interstate 24 passes through the town just south and west of the town center, with access from Exits 134 and 135. I-24 leads northwest 88 miles (142 km) to Nashville and southeast 46 miles (74 km) to Chattanooga. U.S. Route 41 is Main Street through the town, leading east 6 miles (10 km) to Tracy City and northwest 24 miles (39 km) to Manchester. U.S. Route 41A branches off from US 41 in Monteagle and leads southwest 5.5 miles (8.9 km) to Sewanee. Winchester is 18 miles (29 km) to the west via US 41A.

According to the United States Census Bureau, the town has a total area of 8.6 square miles (22.3 km^{2}), of which 8.5 square miles (22.1 km^{2}) is land and 0.04 square miles (0.1 km^{2}), or 0.48%, is water. The north side of town drains off the plateau into Layne Cove and is part of the Elk River watershed, while the south side drains into Ladd Cove and Cave Cove, part of the Battle Creek watershed. Both watersheds flow to the Tennessee River.

=== Climate ===
Monteagle's climate is subtropical (Cfa) under Köppen, typical of Tennessee. However, it's temperate (Do) under Trewartha due to only having 7 months over 50 °F (10 °C). Additionally, its high precipitation means that it's a rainforest climate more typical of the southern Blue Ridge Mountains (see Appalachian temperate rainforest).

Climate data for Monteagle, Tennessee (1991–2020 normals, extremes 1938–present)
Month	Jan	Feb	Mar	Apr	May	Jun	Jul	Aug	Sep	Oct	Nov	Dec	Year
Record high °F (°C)	73 (23)	80 (27)	82 (28)	88 (31)	95 (35)	100 (38)	101 (38)	99 (37)	98 (37)	91 (33)	81 (27)	73 (23)	101 (38)
Mean maximum °F (°C)	64.0 (17.8)	67.6 (19.8)	74.7 (23.7)	80.5 (26.9)	83.4 (28.6)	87.9 (31.1)	89.6 (32.0)	89.0 (31.7)	85.9 (29.9)	79.7 (26.5)	72.3 (22.4)	63.7 (17.6)	91.2 (32.9)
Mean daily maximum °F (°C)	44.3 (6.8)	48.7 (9.3)	57.3 (14.1)	66.8 (19.3)	73.8 (23.2)	80.3 (26.8)	83.2 (28.4)	82.7 (28.2)	78.0 (25.6)	67.8 (19.9)	56.7 (13.7)	47.9 (8.8)	65.6 (18.7)
Daily mean °F (°C)	35.4 (1.9)	39.3 (4.1)	47.1 (8.4)	56.0 (13.3)	63.8 (17.7)	70.8 (21.6)	74.0 (23.3)	73.3 (22.9)	68.1 (20.1)	57.3 (14.1)	46.8 (8.2)	39.1 (3.9)	55.9 (13.3)
Mean daily minimum °F (°C)	26.4 (−3.1)	29.8 (−1.2)	36.8 (2.7)	45.2 (7.3)	53.8 (12.1)	61.3 (16.3)	64.8 (18.2)	64.0 (17.8)	58.2 (14.6)	46.7 (8.2)	36.8 (2.7)	30.3 (−0.9)	46.2 (7.9)
Mean minimum °F (°C)	7.1 (−13.8)	12.9 (−10.6)	18.9 (−7.3)	29.4 (−1.4)	38.8 (3.8)	51.0 (10.6)	57.3 (14.1)	56.6 (13.7)	44.5 (6.9)	31.1 (−0.5)	21.1 (−6.1)	14.2 (−9.9)	4.4 (−15.3)
Record low °F (°C)	−20 (−29)	−8 (−22)	1 (−17)	19 (−7)	30 (−1)	40 (4)	48 (9)	44 (7)	33 (1)	21 (−6)	−7 (−22)	−9 (−23)	−20 (−29)
Average precipitation inches (mm)	5.68 (144)	5.77 (147)	6.31 (160)	6.26 (159)	5.31 (135)	5.76 (146)	6.40 (163)	4.75 (121)	4.59 (117)	4.09 (104)	5.22 (133)	6.82 (173)	66.96 (1,701)
Average snowfall inches (cm)	1.5 (3.8)	1.9 (4.8)	0.8 (2.0)	0.0 (0.0)	0.0 (0.0)	0.0 (0.0)	0.0 (0.0)	0.0 (0.0)	0.0 (0.0)	0.0 (0.0)	0.1 (0.25)	1.1 (2.8)	5.4 (14)
Average precipitation days (≥ 0.01 in)	12.8	12.3	12.8	11.6	11.9	12.5	12.8	11.0	8.6	9.1	10.1	13.0	138.5
Average snowy days (≥ 0.1 in)	1.1	1.1	0.6	0.0	0.0	0.0	0.0	0.0	0.0	0.0	0.1	0.7	3.6
Source: NOAA

== Demographics ==
Historical population
Census	Pop.	Note	%±
1970	934		—
1980	1,126		20.6%
1990	1,138		1.1%
2000	1,238		8.8%
2010	1,192		−3.7%
2020	1,393		16.9%

=== 2020 census ===
Monteagle racial composition
Race	Number	Percentage
White (non-Hispanic)	1,256	90.17%
Black or African American (non-Hispanic)	12	0.86%
Native American	1	0.07%
Asian	23	1.65%
Other/Mixed	67	4.81%
Hispanic or Latino	34	2.44%

As of the 2020 United States census, there were 1,393 people, 614 households, and 458 families residing in the town.

=== 2000 census ===
As of the census of 2000, there were 1,238 people, 477 households, and 321 families residing in the town. The population density was 152.2 inhabitants per square mile (58.8/km^{2}). There were 701 housing units at an average density of 86.2 units per square mile (33.3 units/km^{2}). The racial makeup of the town was 96.45% White, 1.37% African American, 0.32% Native American, 0.73% Asian, 0.08% from other races, and 1.05% from two or more races. Hispanic or Latino of any race were 0.48% of the population.

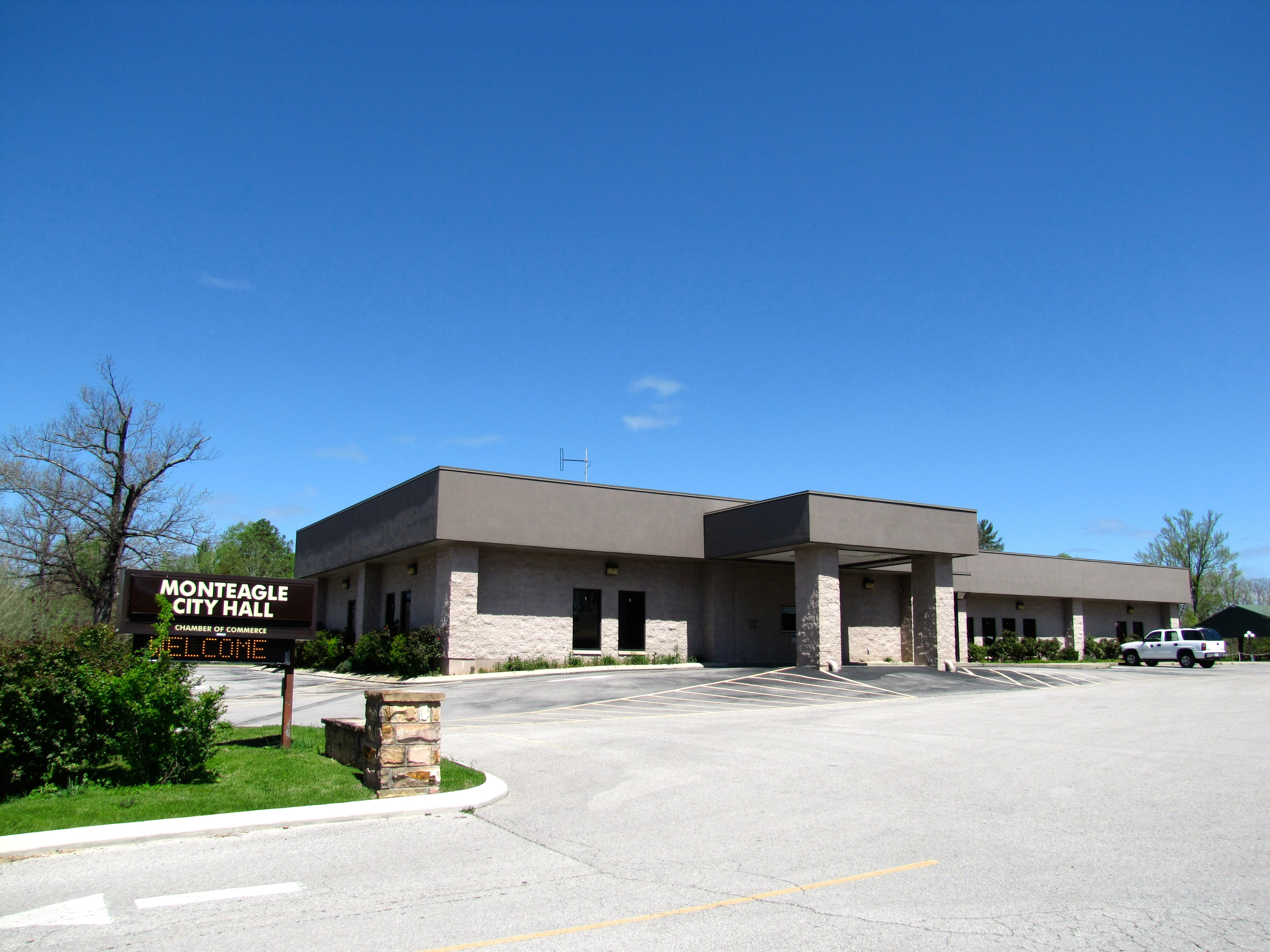
Monteagle City Hall

There were 477 households, out of which 26.0% had children under the age of 18 living with them, 49.3% were married couples living together, 15.5% had a female householder with no husband present, and 32.7% were non-families. 28.3% of all households were made up of individuals, and 14.9% had someone living alone who was 65 years of age or older. The average household size was 2.33 and the average family size was 2.85.

In the town, the population was spread out, with 19.5% under the age of 18, 7.8% from 18 to 24, 23.0% from 25 to 44, 24.2% from 45 to 64, and 25.5% who were 65 years of age or older. The median age was 45 years. For every 100 females, there were 89.3 males. For every 100 females age 18 and over, there were 80.6 males.

The median income for a household in the town was $24,464, and the median income for a family was $29,886. Males had a median income of $24,643 versus $17,708 for females. The per capita income for the town was $12,983. About 21.7% of families and 25.6% of the population were below the poverty line, including 42.4% of those under age 18 and 17.6% of those age 65 or over.

== Places of interest ==
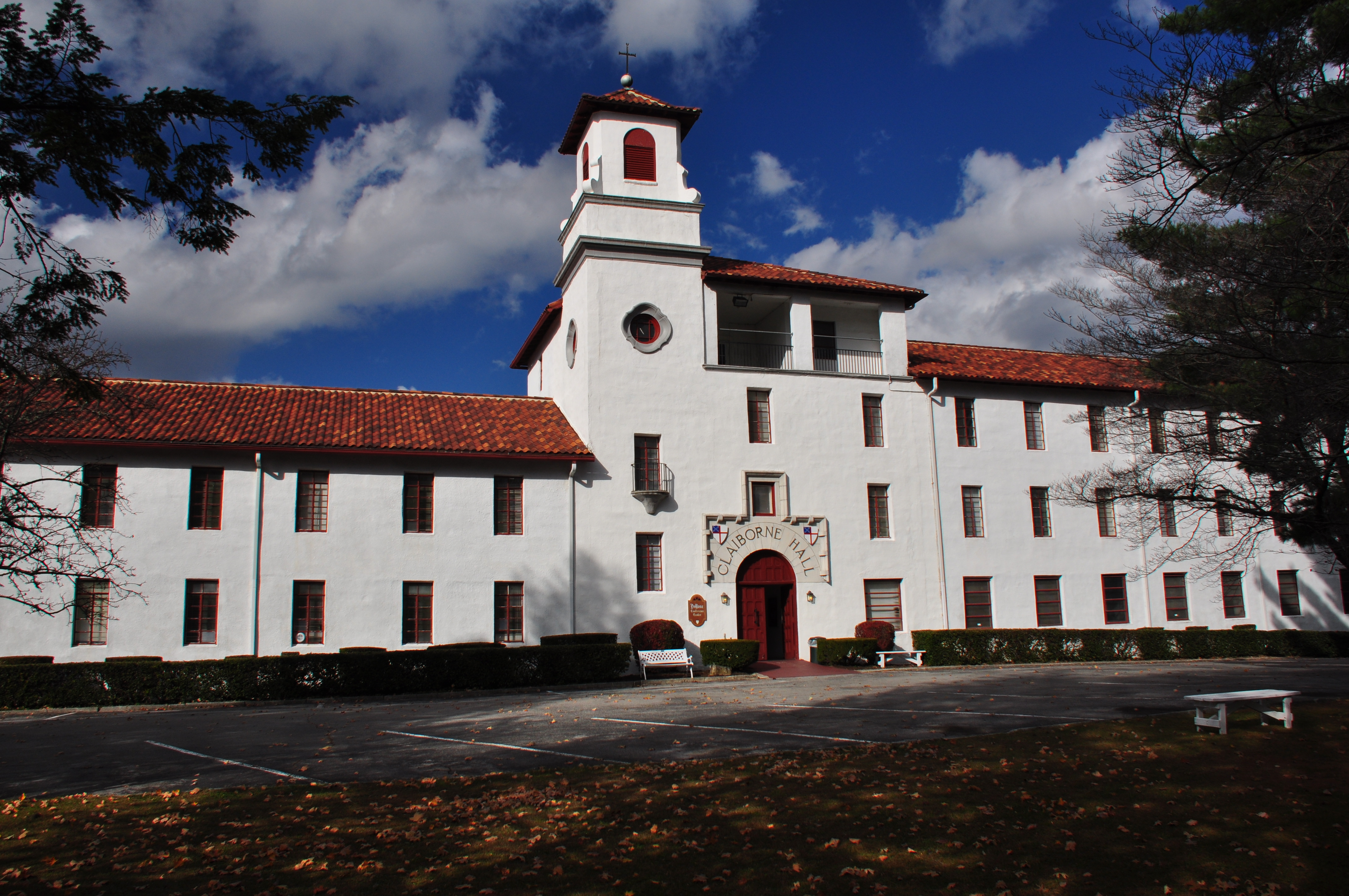
DuBose Conference Center

- DuBose Conference Center
- Monteagle Sunday School Assembly
- Highlander Folk School

== Notable people ==
- Mary Anderson, inventor of the windshield wiper
- May Justus, award-winning author
- Edwin A. Keeble, architect (Nashville's Life & Casualty Tower)
- William Millsaps, presiding bishop of the Episcopal Missionary Church
- William Alexander Percy, poet and lawyer, bought Brinkwood, a summer house in Monteagle.
